= List of reportedly haunted locations in Mexico =

The following is a list of reportedly haunted locations in Mexico.

== Aguascalientes ==
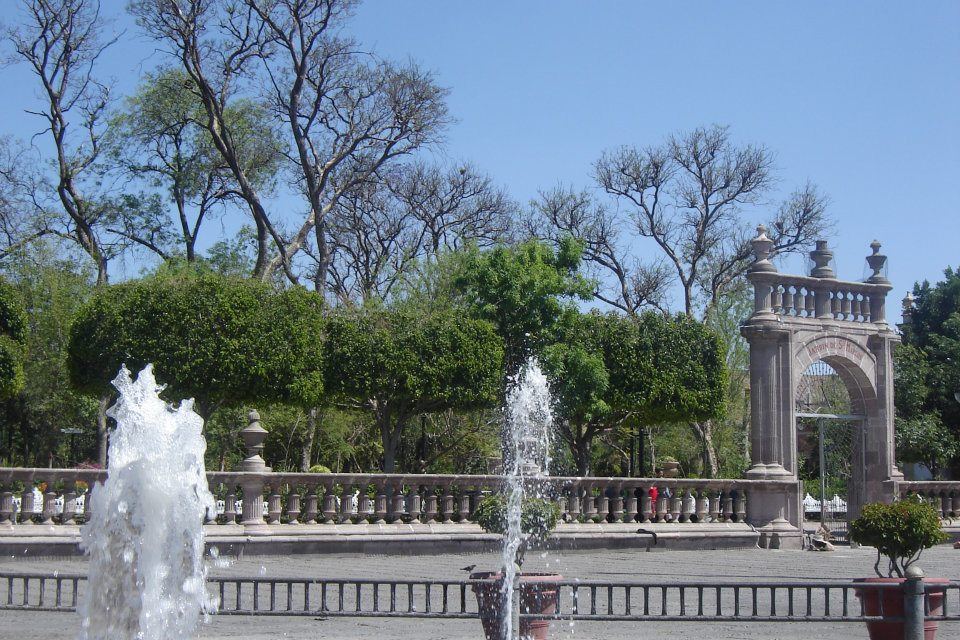
Fountain in Garden of San Marcos.

- Garden of San Marcos in Aguascalientes City: park founded in 1847 that annually houses the San Marcos Fair. According to the legend, it is haunted by a male ghost who prays every night at the churches' doors on the park. This is the spirit of a 19th-century man named Felipe Rey González, who hid his treasure in the garden. He died before telling anyone where it was, and supposedly, this circumstance turned him into a ghost.

== Baja California ==
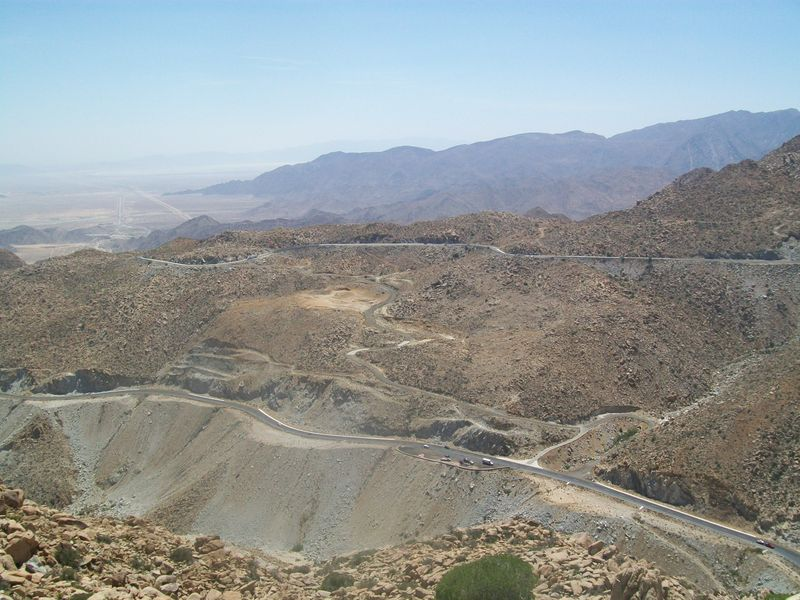
La Rumorosa Highway

- Agua Caliente Casino and Hotel in Tijuana: a former casino, now a high school, which is allegedly haunted by a female singer who poisoned her lover after stealing money from him in the 1930s. According to legend, the man pursued her in an attempt to get the antidote, but she refused to give it to him, and he shot her to death in frustration.
- La Rumorosa Highway: is a famous and heavily traveled road that crosses the Sierra de Juárez Mountains in Baja California. From the 1950s through today, truck drivers and travelers report encounters with phantom hitchhikers, demon children, shadow people and alien-like creatures.

== Baja California Sur ==
- Colegio Salvatierra in Santa Rosalía, Baja California Sur: according to legend, there was a student, a small child, who used to play with marbles in the girls' bathroom. One day he accidentally swallowed a marble, which choked him to death. After teachers took out the body, girls who enter the bathroom have said that they heard noises of laughter and a child playing with marbles, and some have said they have seen marbles roll into the bathhouses.
- Hotel California in Todos los Santos, Baja California Sur: founded in 1948; several entities supposedly haunted the inn's courtyard.
- Hotel Finnestera in Cabo San Lucas: the ghost of a maid as well as voices are allegedly encountered.
- Biblioteca Estatal Justo Sierra in La Paz: founded in 1918; during its history the building was a prison, a hospital and an orphanage. Allegedly a little girl haunts it; other phenomena reported here are voices, cries and dark profiles moving.
- Panteón Zacatal in La Paz: built on the grounds of an ancient plantation, allegedly several entities haunt it; one of these is the plantation's old owner, Manuel Sandoval.

== Chihuahua ==
- Chihuahua, Chihuahua: a mansion built from 1888 to 1893; supposedly at least five ghosts inhabit it. The former and the most active is a boy, who usually appears playing with a blue ball on the staircase; according to the legend he was the son of the first house owner, General Luis Terrazas. Other spirits are a little girl, a little boy with a sailor suit, a lady of white and a lady of black. Currently, the building operates as a restaurant.
- La Popular Store in Chihuahua, Chihuahua: a wedding boutique which is home to a mannequin that is allegedly an embalmed corpse. According to many witnesses, it moves, blinks and sometimes walks on its own. The story dates back to the 1930s. The mannequin is known as "Pascualita", or "Chonita". According to the legend, a bride was bitten by a spider or scorpion on the day before her wedding, causing her death. The bereft mother (who is the one named "Pascualita"), saddened beyond consolation, hired the best funerary services and had her daughter embalmed, dressed in the wedding gown, and later displayed the corpse, passing it off as a mannequin. Some versions claim that it was her fiancé that had her embalmed. It is common for late-night taxi drivers to notice the mannequin take life, as the bride's intended was a taxi driver himself. In 2017, the mannequin was taken out of the wedding boutique for the first time and displayed in Mexico City, Mexico as part of Hotel de Leyendas Victoria event.

== Durango ==
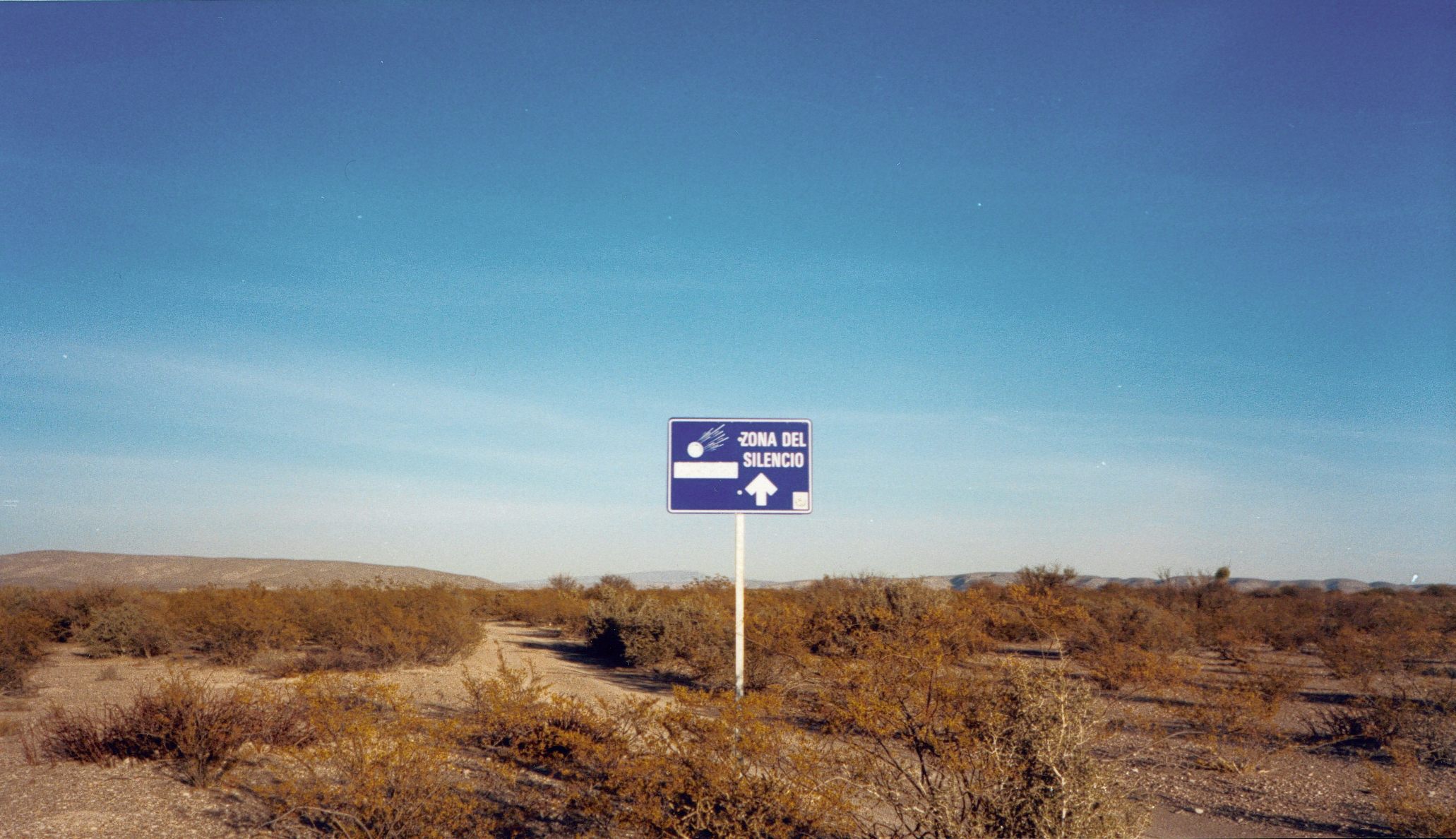
The Mapimí Silent Zone, also known as the Death Zone or the Zone of Silence.

- Mapimí Silent Zone in Bolsón de Mapimí, Durango: a legendary site of paranormal phenomena; allegedly orbs and a tall blond man appear on the site. There are also several alleged ufological phenomena such as UFOs and alien-like creatures reportedly spotted on the site.
- Ojuela in Mapimí: a ghost town founded in the 1590s and abandoned in 1928 after a flood, it is considered one of the scariest towns in Mexico particularly for its proximity to Mapimí Silent Zone.

== Guanajuato ==
- Callejón del Beso ('The Kiss Alley') in Guanajuato, Guanajuato: allegedly haunted by two lovers who died in tragic circumstances here.
- Casa de la tía Aura ('House of Aunt Aura') in Guanajuato, Guanajuato: built in 1805. During the 1840s, two women were murdered in the property by their own father, the first daughter was walled in the basement when he found out that she got pregnant without being married and the second was poisoned afterwards so he could inherit everything. People say that they can hear voices and see orbs and shadows in the house. The house is now a museum.
- Casa de las Brujas, or the House of the Witches, in Guanajuato, was built in 1845 and was owned by a Dutch mine owner by the name of Juan Carson. He was imprisoned for murder, and his daughter, Susan, was left in the custody of her aunts in the house. She was supposedly found beaten and starved to death in the cellar a year later. According to legend, Susan's ghost is said to haunt the house, and odd sounds and cold spots have been reported.
- Casa de Sierra Nevada Hotel in San Miguel de Allende, Guanajuato: allegedly, in this colonial building, the spirits of a 1910s butler and a 19th-century little girl appear. The first is said to often interact with people and a coffee aroma is associated with his presence; the second ghost often wanders in the gardens.

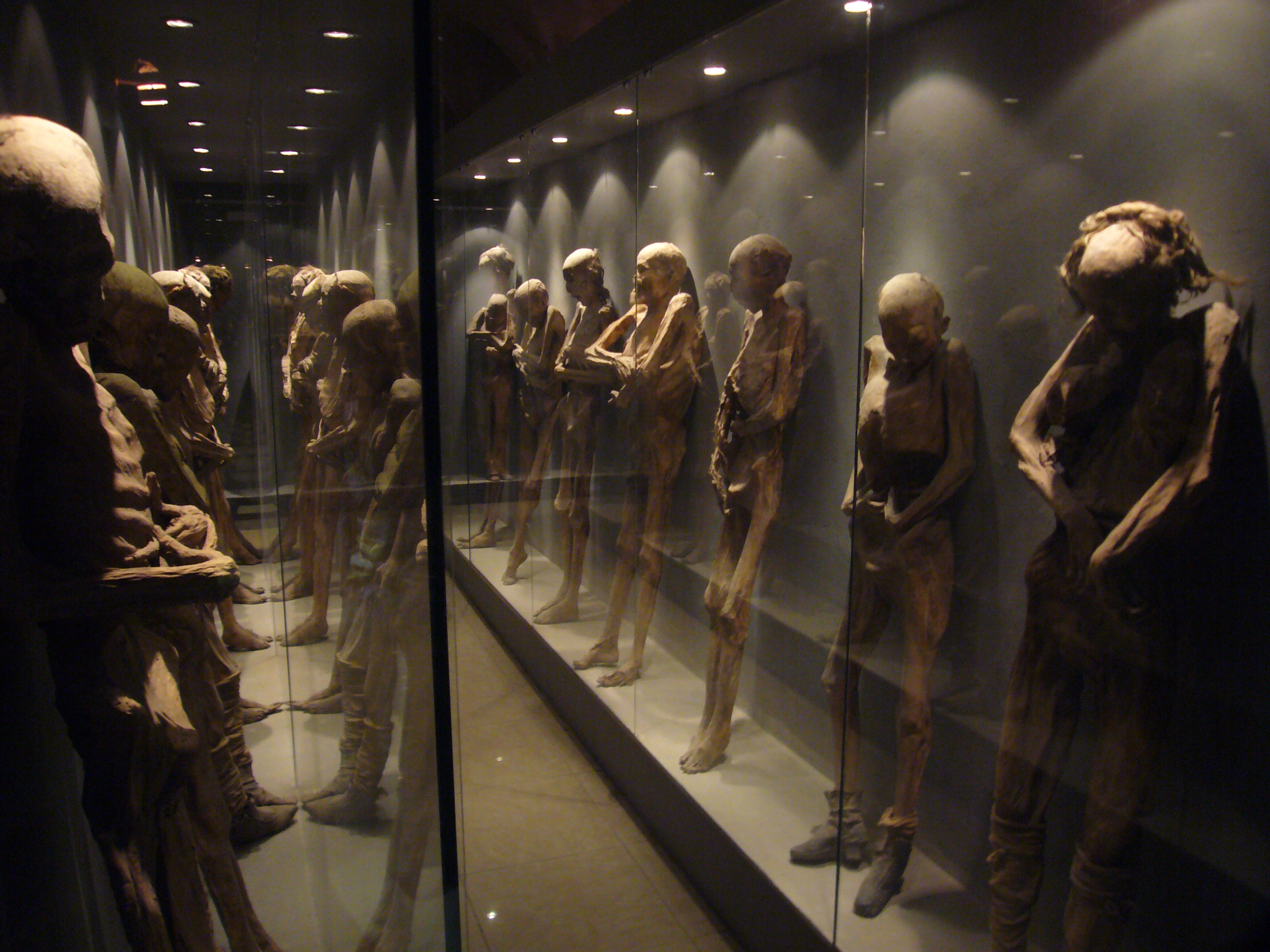
Mummies on exhibition, House of mummies in Guanajuato

- Castillo de Santa Cecilia Hotel in Guanajuato, Guanajuato: founded in 1686, during its history the building was a plantation and a hospital; it was opened as a hotel in 1951. Several paranormal phenomena are reported in the hotel such as crosses made of oil that appear in the rooms' windows, inexplicable sounds and objects that move on their own.
- Hotel San Diego in Guanajuato: according to a legend, there is a room on the hotel's top floor where the sounds of doors slamming and furniture moving around can be heard.
- House of Laments or Casa de los Lamentos in Guanajuato, Guanajuato: this mansion was the house of a serial killer active from the 1890s to the 1910s named Tadeo Fulgencío Mejía. According to the legend, his victims' crying can be heard in the mansion.
- House of Mummies in Guanajuato, Guanajuato: a museum where the natural mummies of Santa Paula cemetery are on exhibition. Paranormal phenomena have been reported such as the apparition of a tall woman, cries of babies and strange whispering sounds.
- Mineral de Pozos in San Luis de la Paz, Guanajuato: a ghost town from 1920; allegedly miners who died during a flood haunt the mines around the city.

== Jalisco ==
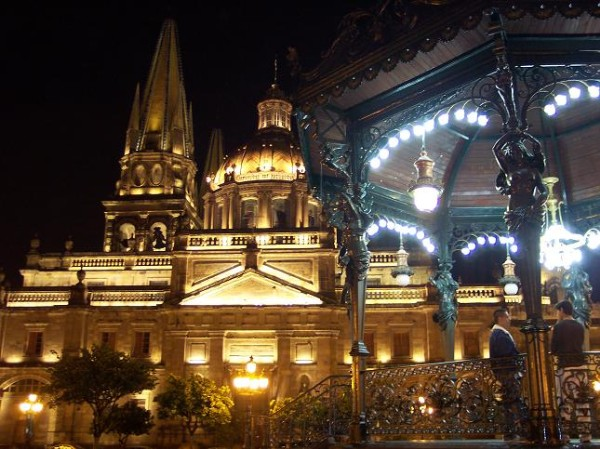
Guadalajara Cathedral

- Guadalajara Cathedral in Guadalajara, Jalisco: built in 1618, this church keeps the remains of a 1700s little girl who was stabbed to death by her own father; he disapproved of his daughter's interest in Catholicism and was enraged when he found out that she received the Eucharist without his permission, leading him to murder her. Known as Holy Innocence (Spanish: Santa Inocencia), the mummified body reportedly moves by itself, her hair and nails still grow, and there is a video where she appears to blink.
- Panteón de Belén (Belen Cemetery): located in the center of Guadalajara, it was opened in 1848. According to local legend several entities appear here and many mysteries surround the cemetery, including the "Vampire Tree" and the very visited tomb of "Nachito".
- Clover Lawn House or Casa del Trébol Negro in Guadalajara, Jalisco: built in 1908. Reputed to be haunted by a father who murdered his wife and daughter in the house. Supposedly, the ghosts wander throughout the property; bloody marks appear in the room walls; crying, shouting and voices are heard in the house.

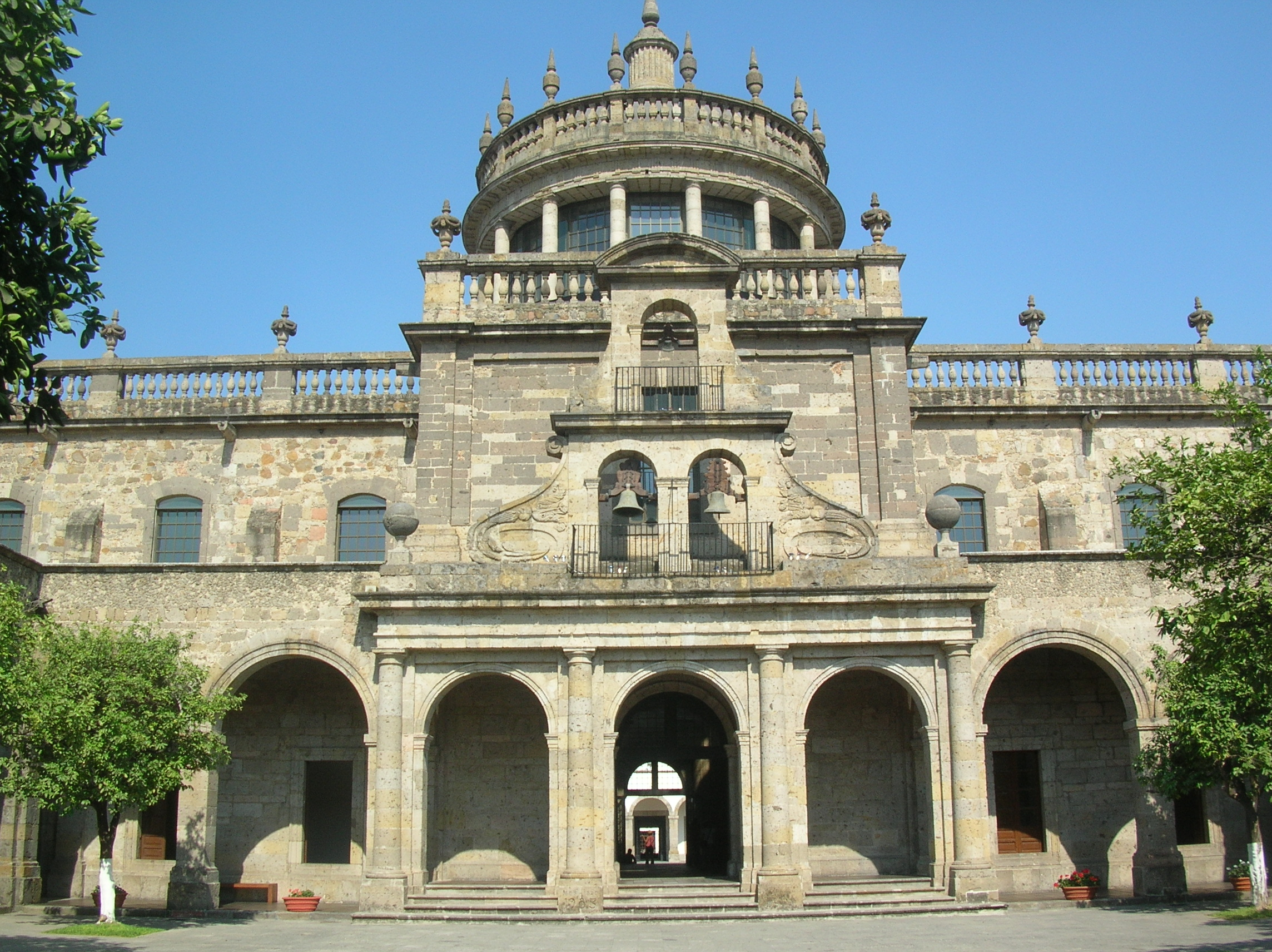
Hospicio Cabañas

- Hospicio Cabañas in Guadalajara, Jalisco: built from 1805 to 1810, during the building's history it was an asylum, military barrack, prison and orphanage. According to legend, several ghosts haunt it, mainly spirit children who wander in the building. Also supposedly it had a monumental clock installed in 1952. The clock mysteriously stopped whenever a child died in the orphanage.
- Hospital Fray Antonio Alcalde y Barriga in Guadalajara: opened in 1788 and still in operation. Supposedly, several paranormal entities appear in the hospital; the most active is a 19th-century female nurse named Manuela Lozano, who wanders the Internal Medicine wing.
- Journalism Museum, also known as La Casa de los Perros or The House of the Dogs: located in the center of Guadalajara, it is a colonial mansion that in the 1790s housed the first independent newspaper of America. The hauntings are attributed to the original owner's wife, who took on a lover and later conspired to kill her husband.
- Palacio de las Vacas (Cows Palace) in Guadalajara, Jalisco: a Porfirian mansion built between 1890 and 1910; it was the property of dictator Porfirio Diaz and his family, a women's college, a kindergarten and perhaps a brothel; it was also abandoned for many years. Allegedly, it is haunted by various spirits, such as a schoolgirl who committed suicide. Phenomena reported include children's voices, screams, and shadows.

== Mexico City ==
- Mexico City International Airport in Venustiano Carranza, Mexico City: allegedly haunted by a little girl who often appears to be playing with a ball and interacts with people. She asks them to tie her shoelace then disappears. Supposedly the ghost was filmed and the video can be seen on YouTube. Also, in 2016, a patrolman reported seeing a ghost in the back of an airplane and recorded it on his phone.
- Bamer Building in the Historic center of Mexico City: founded in 1953 and was a hotel until the 1990s. Several paranormal phenomena are reported in the building, including bizarre sounds, pommels that emit electric discharge and the apparitions of a little girl.
- Callejón del Aguacate in Coyoacán, Mexico City: the site of esoteric rituals; according to testimony, an entity wanders through this backstreet.
- Casa de la tía Toña ('Aunt Toña's House') in Chapultepec, Mexico City: several fatal accidents were reported on the property. Also, according to the legend, the first owner, a woman, and her adopted children died in the mansion and then haunted it.
- Casa de las Brujas or the Rio de Janeiro building in Colonia Roma, Mexico City: was built in 1908. During the first part of the 20th century, a woman named Bárbara Guerrero, also known as "Pachita", lived there. The legend says that she practiced witchcraft; supposedly several paranormal phenomena occur in the house including the appearance of the ghost of Guerrero.
- Casa de los Condes de la Torre Cossío y de la Cortina, or the House of the Count De la Torre y la Cortina, in the Historic center of Mexico City: a colonial mansion, in which a spree killer named Juan Manuel de Solórzano lived in the 1630s. Believing his wife was capable of cheating on him, he killed several men, simply because they walked outside his house. Solórzano would ask them the time; if they responded 11 PM , or showed anxiety, he would stab them. He was executed in 1641. The legend says that a man with 1600s-era clothing wanders in and around the house, sometimes asking bystanders for the time, and soon after doing so, disappearing.
- Casa Negra ('Black House') in Álvaro Obregón, D.F.: a 19th-century mansion, now abandoned. According to the legend, its first owners – a family named Mondragón – died of unknown causes in the house; without a live heir, the property passed into state custody. Supposedly, because of the paranormal phenomena, the house is uninhabitable. Paranormal activity on the site includes temperature changes, voices, bizarre sounds, doors opening and closing by themselves, and invisible hands that regularly touch and pull people.
- Fru Fru Theater: A late 19th century theater located in Donceles street. Due to its extensive and controversial history, the Fru Fru theater is the setting for several paranormal legends. One of the most talked about is “El Catrín”, the spirit of a wealthy man who allegedly curses the plays.
- Hospital Juarez in Gustavo A. Madero, Mexico City: opened in 1847 and still functioning. Here started one of the most famous Mexican ghost stories: the legend of La Planchada, a spirit of an early 20th-century female nurse who haunts the hospital. This ghost has also been seen in several other hospitals around Mexico.
- Instituto Cultural La Moira in San Miguel Chapultepec, Miguel Hidalgo, D.F.: according to legend this house is haunted by several paranormal entities; the most active is a young man named Marcos who died under mysterious circumstances during the 1960s. Allegedly when he was an eight-year-old boy, he entered the then-abandoned building and saw an apparition, a man hanged in one of the rooms. 10 years after the incident, he hanged himself in the same room in an apparent suicide. Several spiritism sessions have been held at the site since. Paranormal phenomena reported in the house include shadows, strange sounds, orbs, and objects moving by themselves. Some people say they have had visions and demonic possessions. According to some parapsychologists, this house is the most haunted in Mexico.
- La Malinche's house in Coyoacán, Mexico City: a 16th-century mansion that is reputed to be haunted by several ghosts, principally the ghost of La Malinche.
- Mexico City Metro: opened to the public in 1969, several entities haunted its installations, mainly people who committed suicide. According to the legend, the Tasqueña station is one of the most haunted places in the train network. Supposedly, an old man appears at night to keep lonely passengers company. The man was murdered while sitting alone during an assault and for this reason he wants to protect people. Other haunted stations are the Pino Suárez station where an old employee named Victor Castilla Platonoff died on-site in 1989 and apparently does not know that he has died. There have also been reports of colonial monks chanting and ancient Aztec ghosts, including a man who cries because the Spanish Conquest; time traveling and interdimensional portals, the Panteones station where people say that they can hear knocks in the tunnel walls that connect the station with the next one and shadow "lumps" a few feet ahead that disappear as they get close – the paranormal activities in this place are attributed to its proximity to two old graveyards, the Spanish and British graveyards; the Airport station where a little girl appears to be playing with her own severed head; and the Viaducto station where in 1975 the worst subway accident in Mexico City's history occurred with at least 31 deaths – supposedly since then a ghost train runs from Allende station to Zócalo station, the same route as the ill-fated train.
- Palace of the Inquisition in the Historic center of Mexico City: built between 1732 and 1736, it was the place of the New Spain Tribunal of the Holy Inquisition until 1820 when it was disbanded. Supposedly, the building is home to several paranormal entities.
- Palacio de Lecumberri in Venustiano Carranza, Mexico City: built in 1900, it served as a prison for 76 years. Supposedly several entities live in the building, but two are the most active. The first is a male spirit, which wanders throughout the building, wanting to interact with people. Reportedly, he would say "My name's Jacinto" or "Again, Amalia didn't come here" and disappear. The second is also a male spirit, dressed in a black charro costume, who is especially aggressive, and has appeared to many people.
- Panteón de San Isidro in Azcapotzalco, Mexico City: a cemetery exclusively for children; according to legend several entities appear at the site but two are the most active – the first is a little girl named Nani who appears in a street next to the cemetery, causing car accidents because she often distracts the drivers. The second is a boy named David who often interacts with people.
- Plaza de las Tres Culturas or Plaza de Tlatelolco in Cuauhtémoc, Mexico City: the history of location dates to before the 15th century; at this time several tragic events took place. In the Pre-Columbian era, it was the most important market in Mesoamerica but was also a public execution place. During the Spanish conquest of Mexico several Indigenous Mexicans were mass murdered here, resulting in 4,000 deaths on August 13, 1521. Contemporary bloody events such as the Tlatelolco massacre in 1968 and the Nuevo León building collapse during 1985 Mexico City earthquake, with at least 400 fatalities, also occurred here. Stories of ghosts in this place are told from the time of the Aztecs. The paranormal phenomena reported are sounds of children playing, the sounds of the 1968 massacre and shadows moving from the Foreign Relations building to the church.
- Posada del Sol in Colonia Doctores, Mexico City: an ambitious inn project during the 1950s. Due to several mishaps it was never completed. Finally, the owner, Fernando Saldaña, committed suicide on the site in 1945. According to legend, he cursed the property for it will be never inhabited. After Saldaña's death, the building became a home to the Instituto Indigenista Americano, El Consejo de Recursos Minerales and the Procuraduría General de Justicia, but it was always abandoned. Allegedly, the ghost of Saldaña still haunts the lonely building.
- Swamp South of Mexico City: the Island of Dolls is rumoured to be one of the most haunted sites in Mexico. Don Julian Santana was a man who lived as a hermit on the island for over fifty years, where he is believed to have lost his mind. The tragic accident of a girl who drowned on the island while visiting caused further madness in Julian. The island was turned into a shrine for the little girl. Dolls hang in the trees and the house. Each of the dolls is believed to be fused with the energy of the little girl. Candles, hard candy, and dolls are occasionally brought as offerings to appease the spirits. The dolls are said to move, beckon, and speak to those who come. The man's spectre also roams this place. Orbs, loud sounds, and reports of doll eyes opening abound.
- Templo Mayor Museum in the Historic center of Mexico City: an archaeological site corresponding to the ruins of ancient Aztec temples dedicated to the gods Huitzilopochtli, Tlaloc and others; nearly 4,000 people were murdered there during human sacrifices. Allegedly paranormal activities reported include shadows, cries, voices and strange sensations.
- XEW-AM radio station in Coyoacán, Mexico City: allegedly haunted by several ghosts including the spirits of Agustín Lara, Pedro Infante, Jorge Negrete and Alfonso Ortiz Tirado; the paranormal phenomena reported here are voices, objects moving by themselves and even the music of Agustin Lara's piano or his singing, also Negrete, Infante or Ortiz singing.
Haunted places in Mexico City

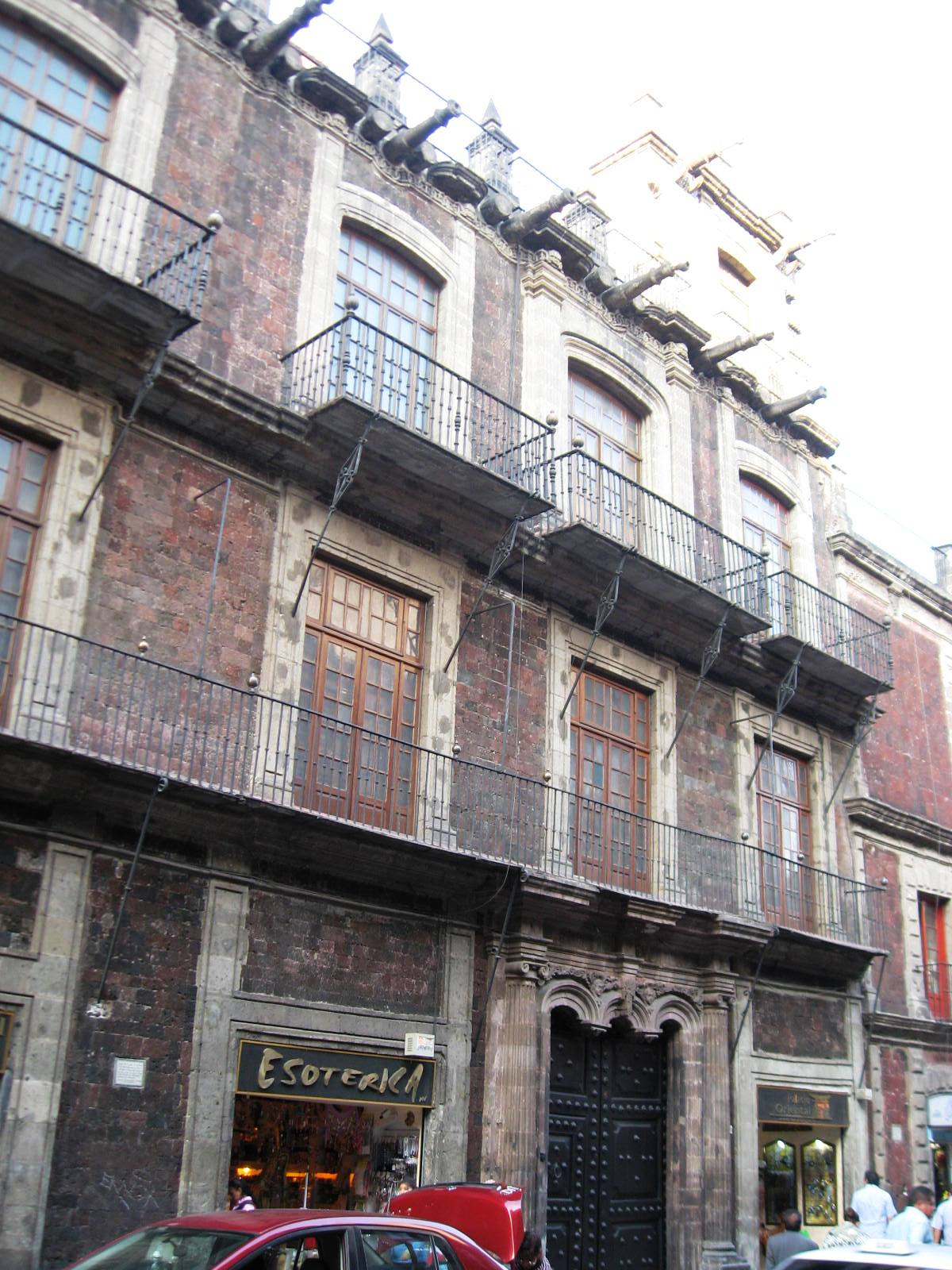
Casa de los Condes de la Torre Cossío y de la Cortina.

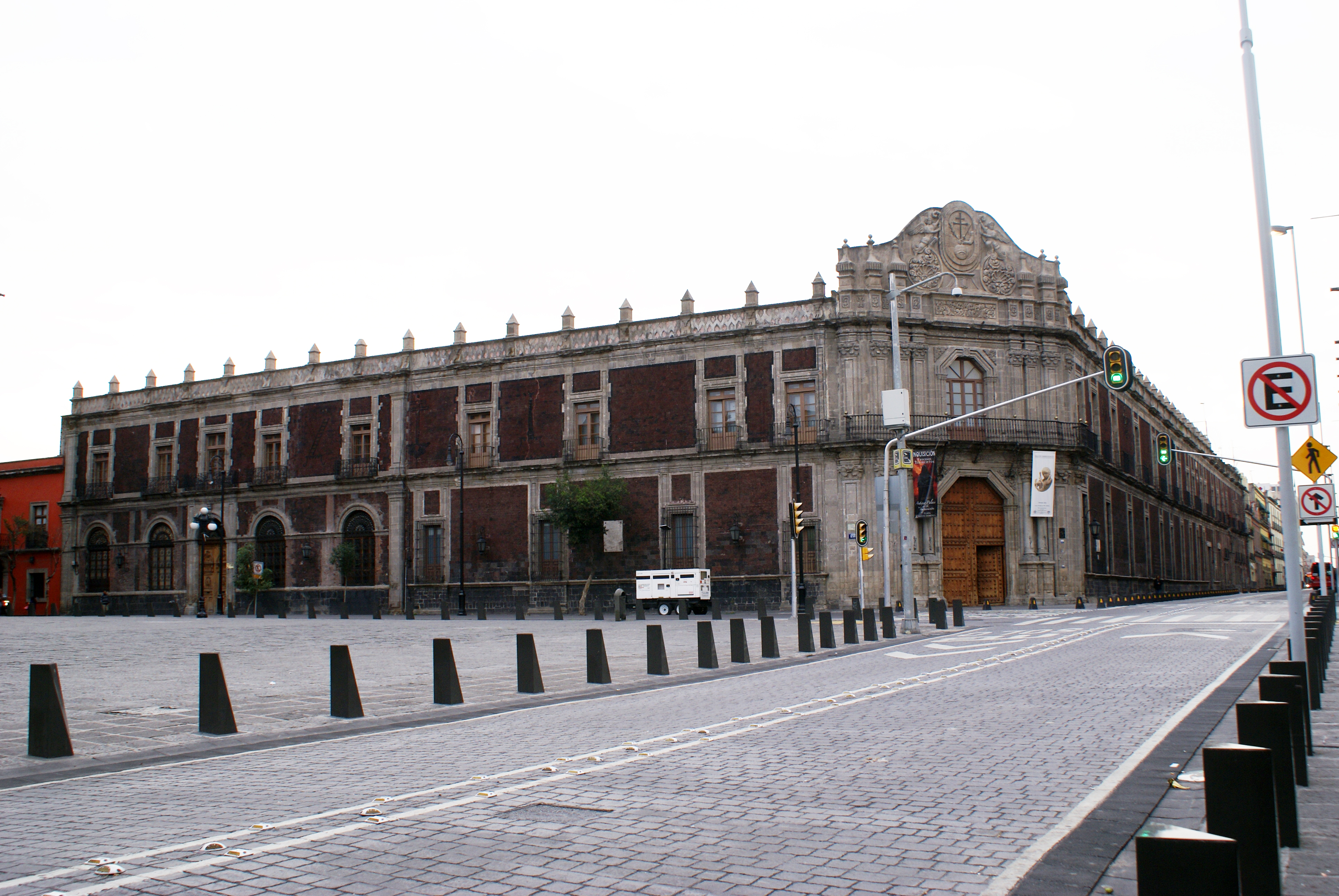
Palace of Inquisition.

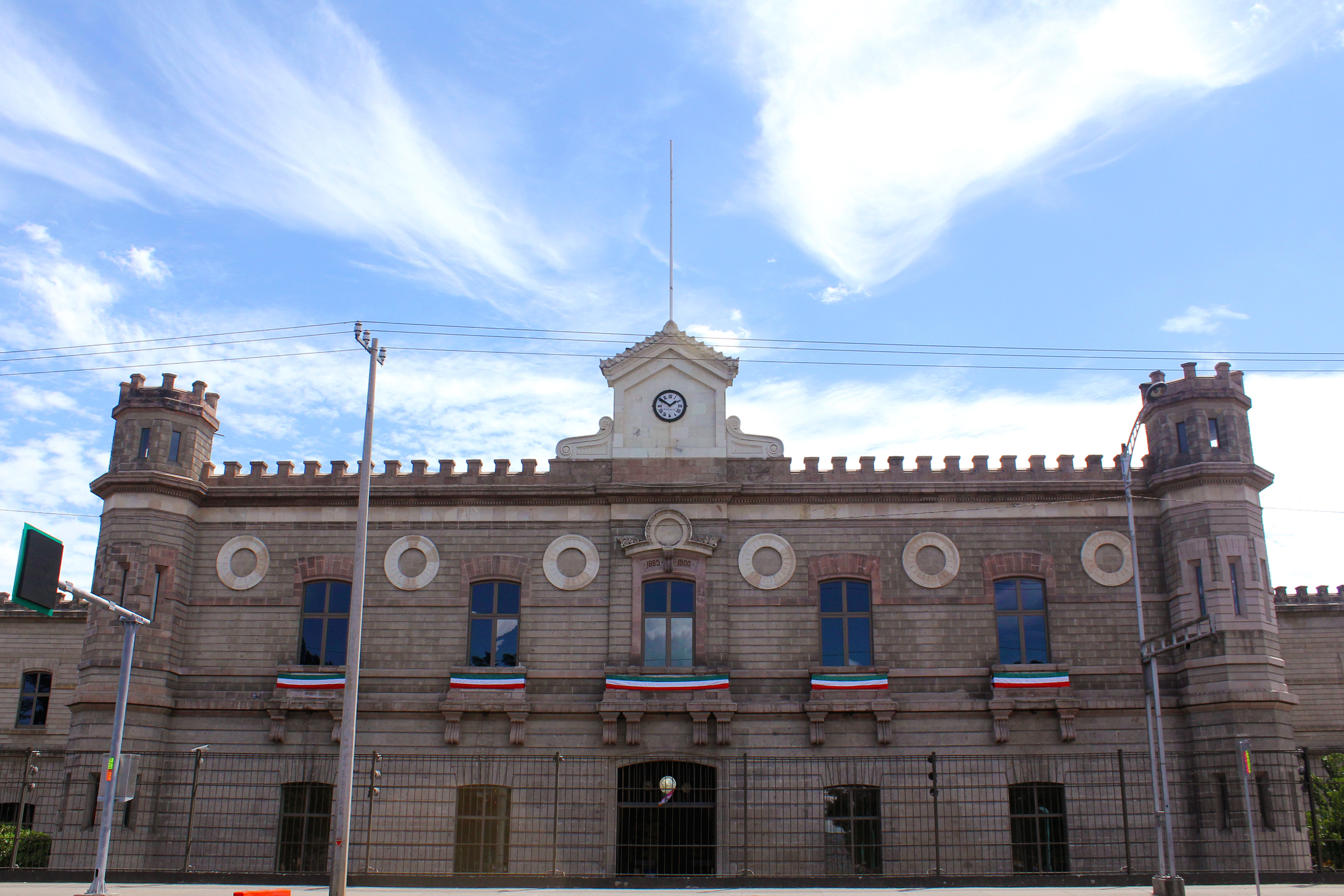
Palacio de Lecumberri.

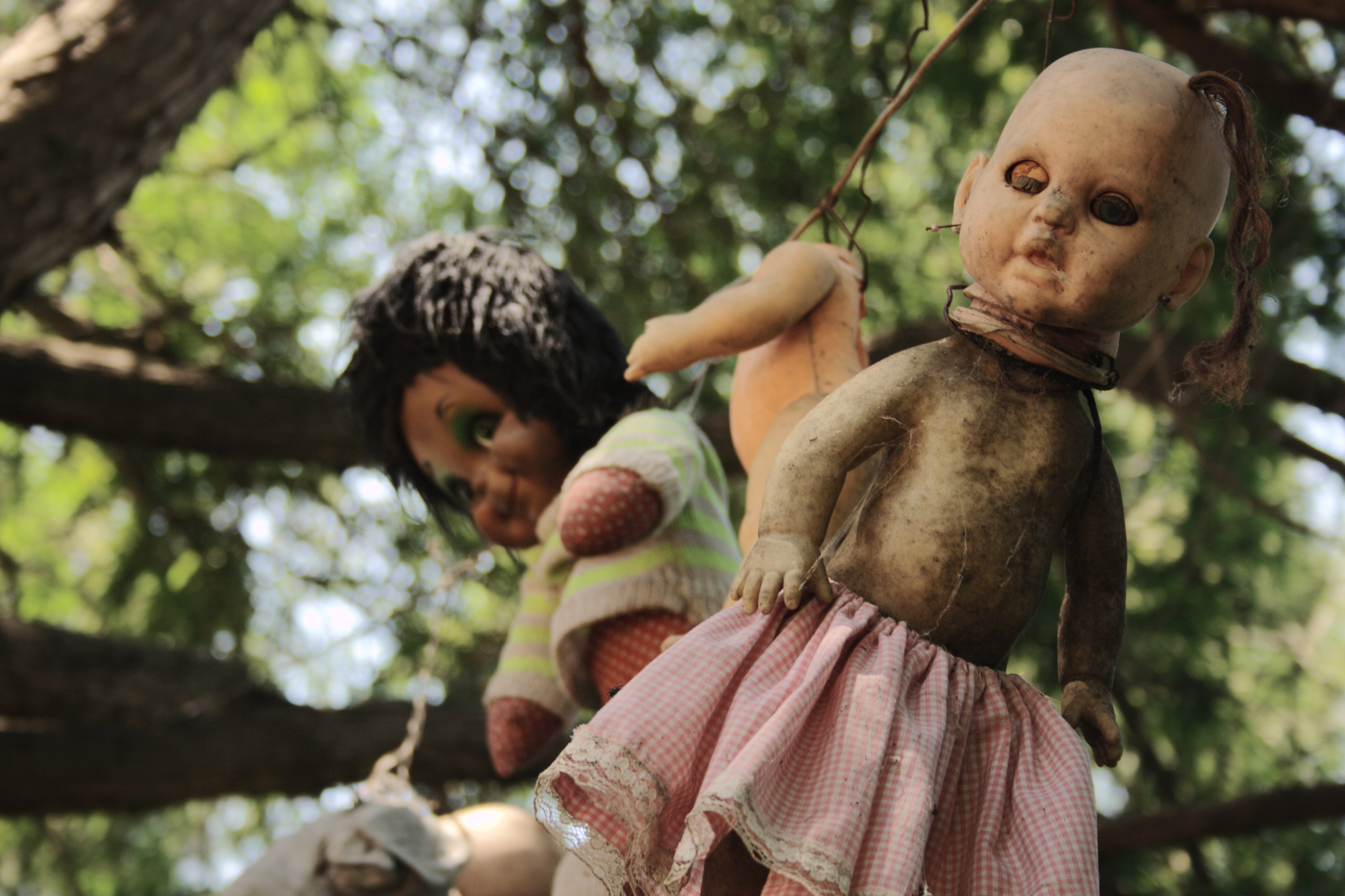
Dolls in the Xochimilco Dolls′ Island.

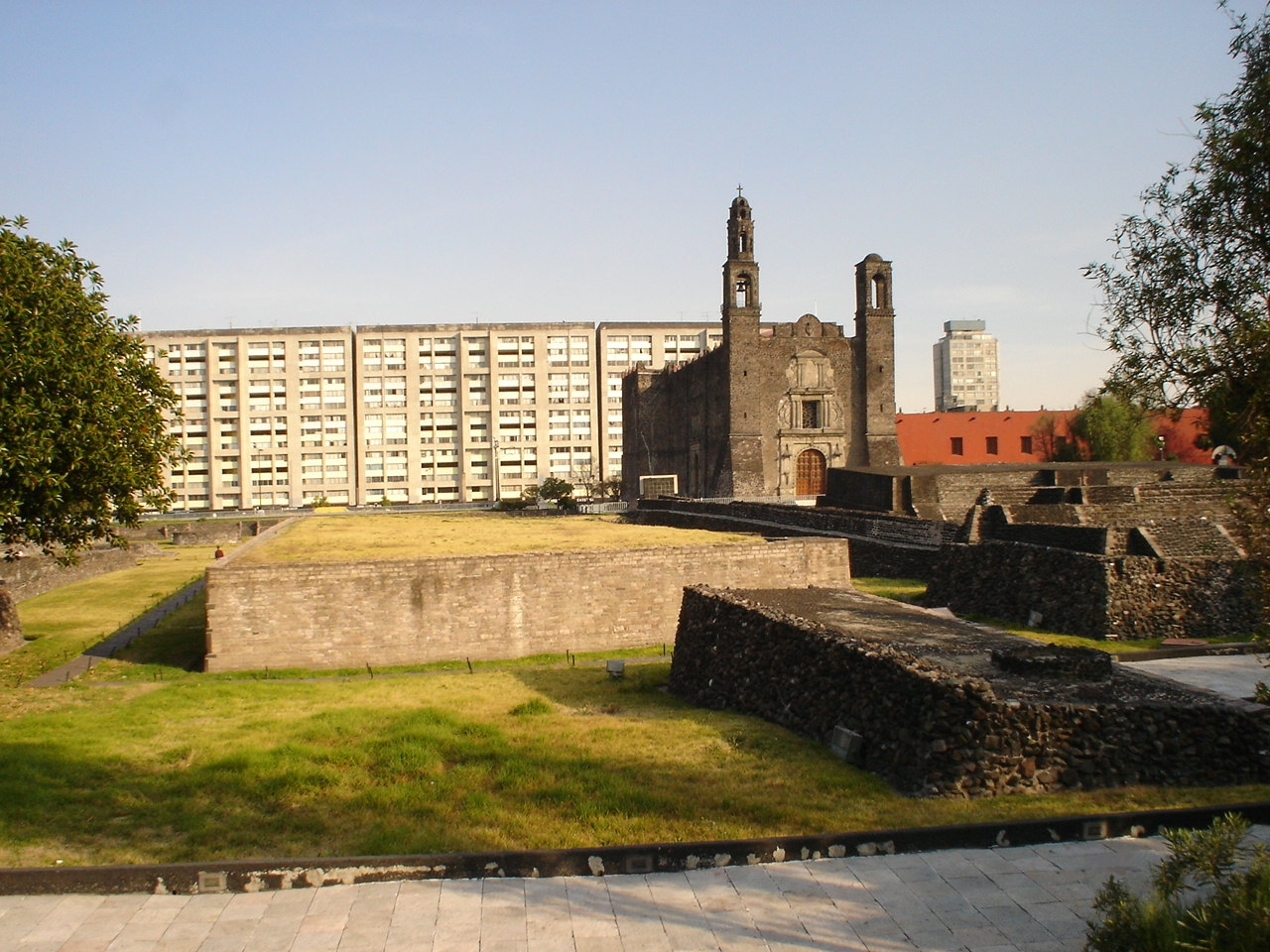
Plaza de las Tres Culturas, Tlatelolco.

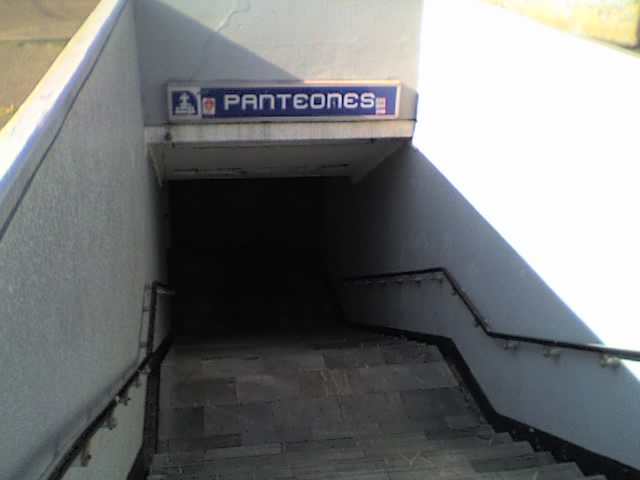
Entrance to Panteones station subway.

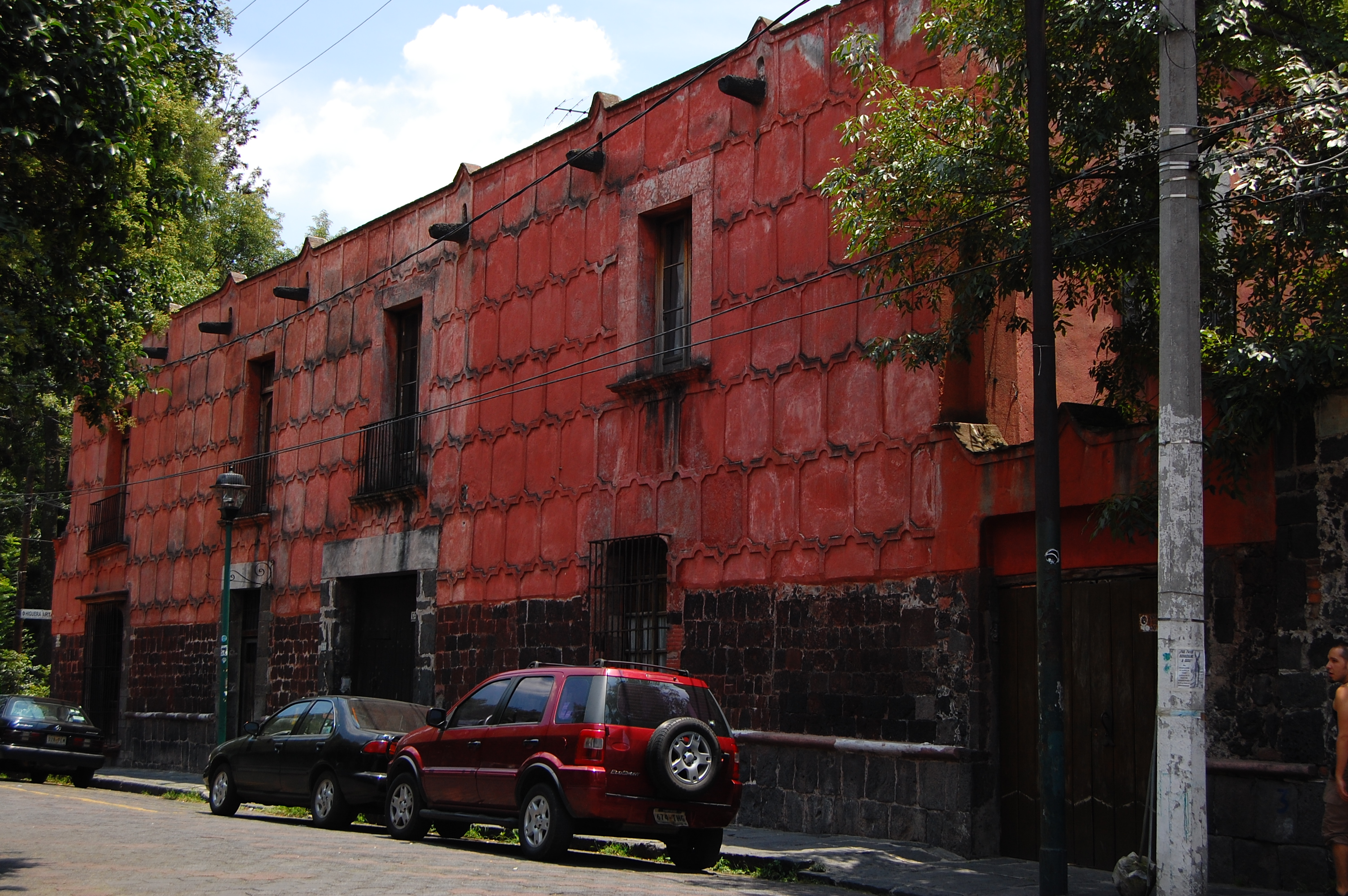
La Malinche's house.

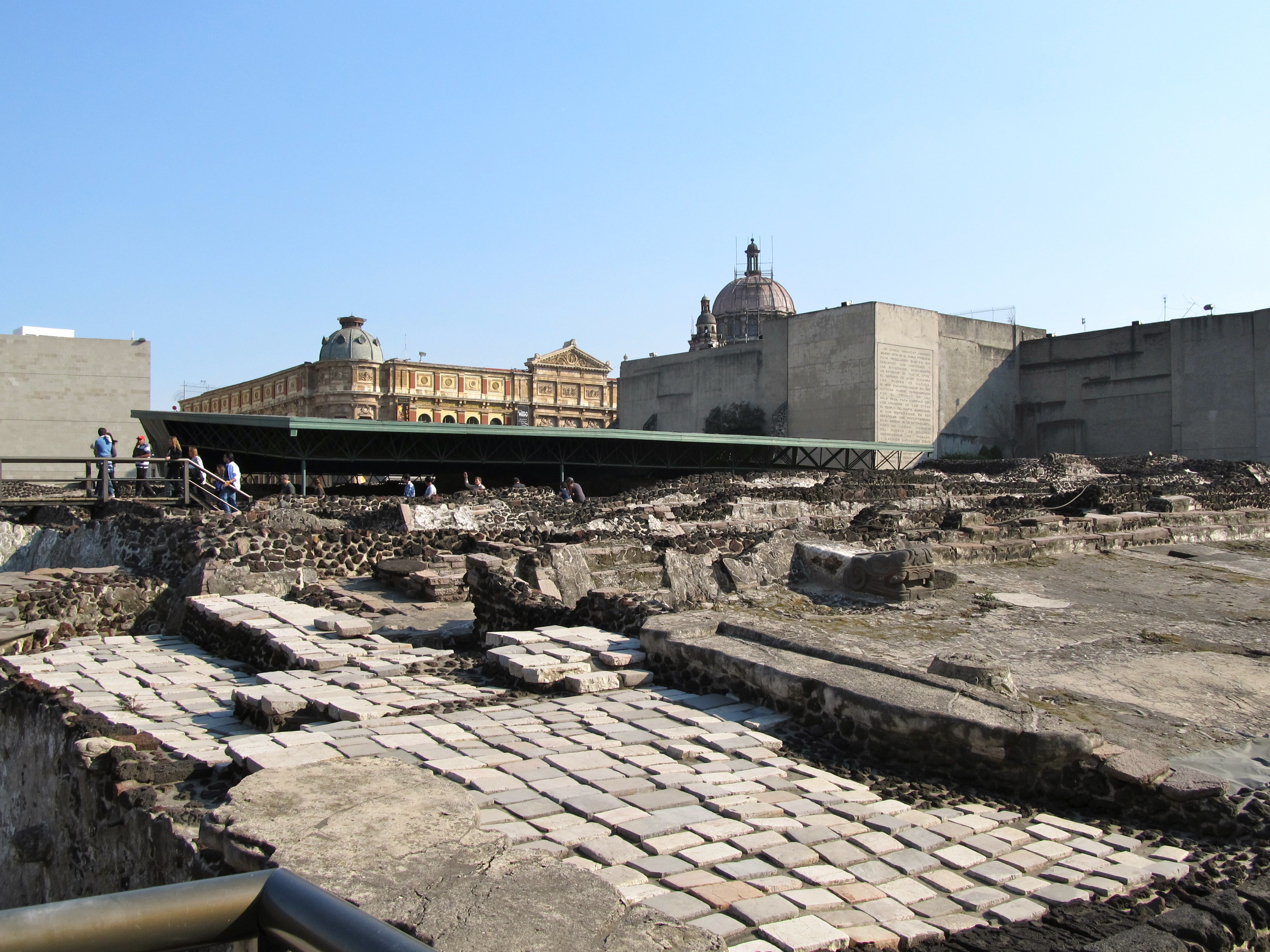
Templo Mayor ruins.

== Michoacán ==
- Lago de Camécuaro National Park in Zamora de Hidalgo: according to legend, the lake is haunted by a Purépecha princess named Huanita. Allegedly, she materializes completely as a beautiful woman in front of people; when she does, she appears to be crying and sometimes tries pulling the legs of people swimming in the lake with the intention of drowning them so that they will be with her forever.

== Nuevo León ==
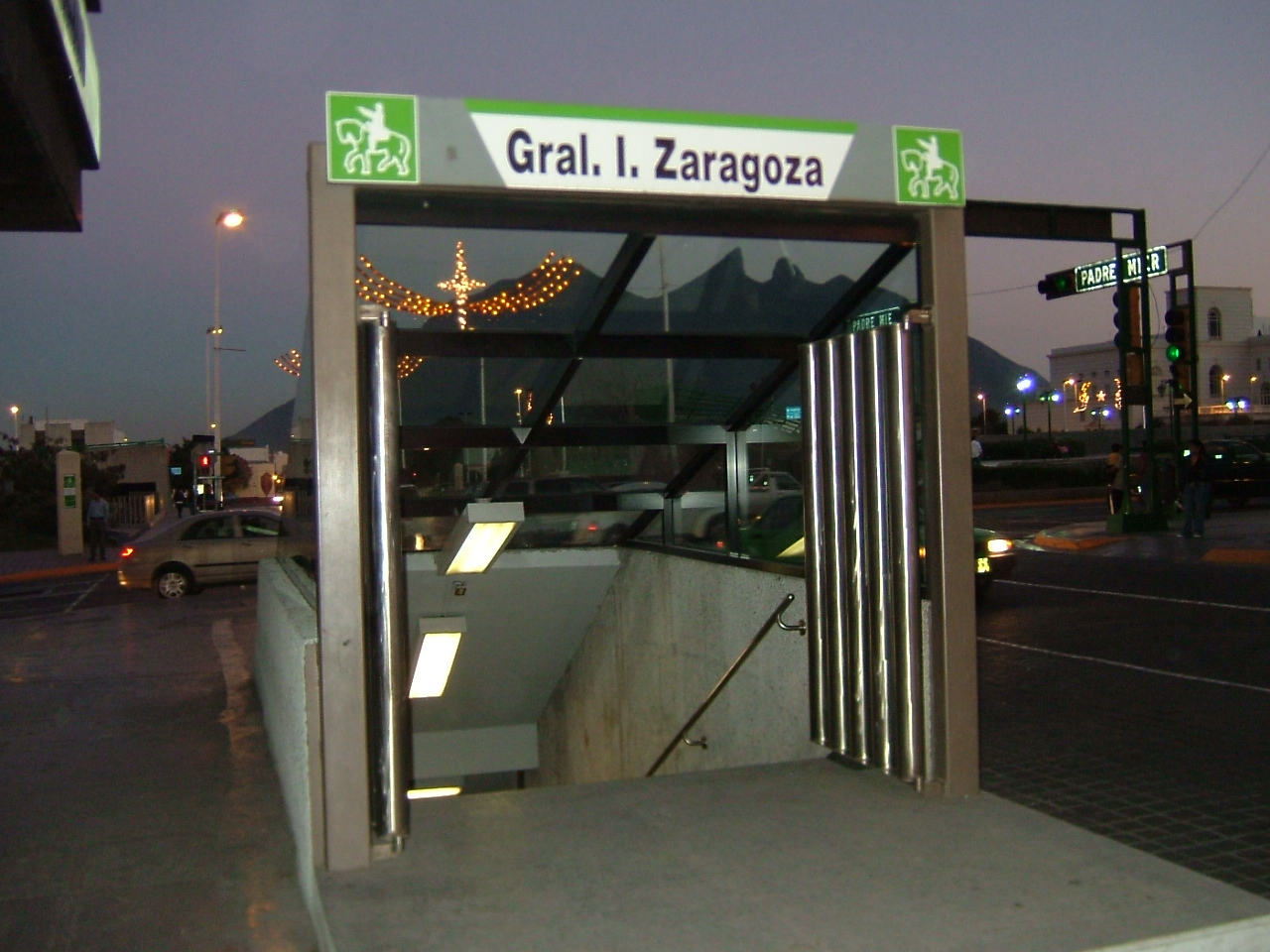
Entrance to Zaragoza station of Monterrey Metro.

- Casa de Aramberri in Monterrey: reputed to be haunted by a man's wife and daughter, who, according to legend, were tortured to death by three male robbers in 1933.
- Casa de los Tubos in Monterrey, Nuevo Leon: an abandoned mansion built during the 1970s, reputed to be haunted by a girl who committed suicide on the property and a boy that died in an accident.
- Villa de Santiago, Puerto Genovevo: these mountainous roads have been the site of many car accidents. Among the numerous crosses, there is a set of ten crosses in memory of a family who were the victims of a truck accident. If one stands next to the crosses, it is rumored to be possible to see a truck moving very fast through the trees. Also, it is said that at midnight the screams and pain of those in the accident can be heard.
- Zaragoza metro station in Monterrey, Nuevo Leon: allegedly, the cries of a ghostly boy can be heard inside of the station; he is heard calling for his dad in a desperate manner.

== Oaxaca ==
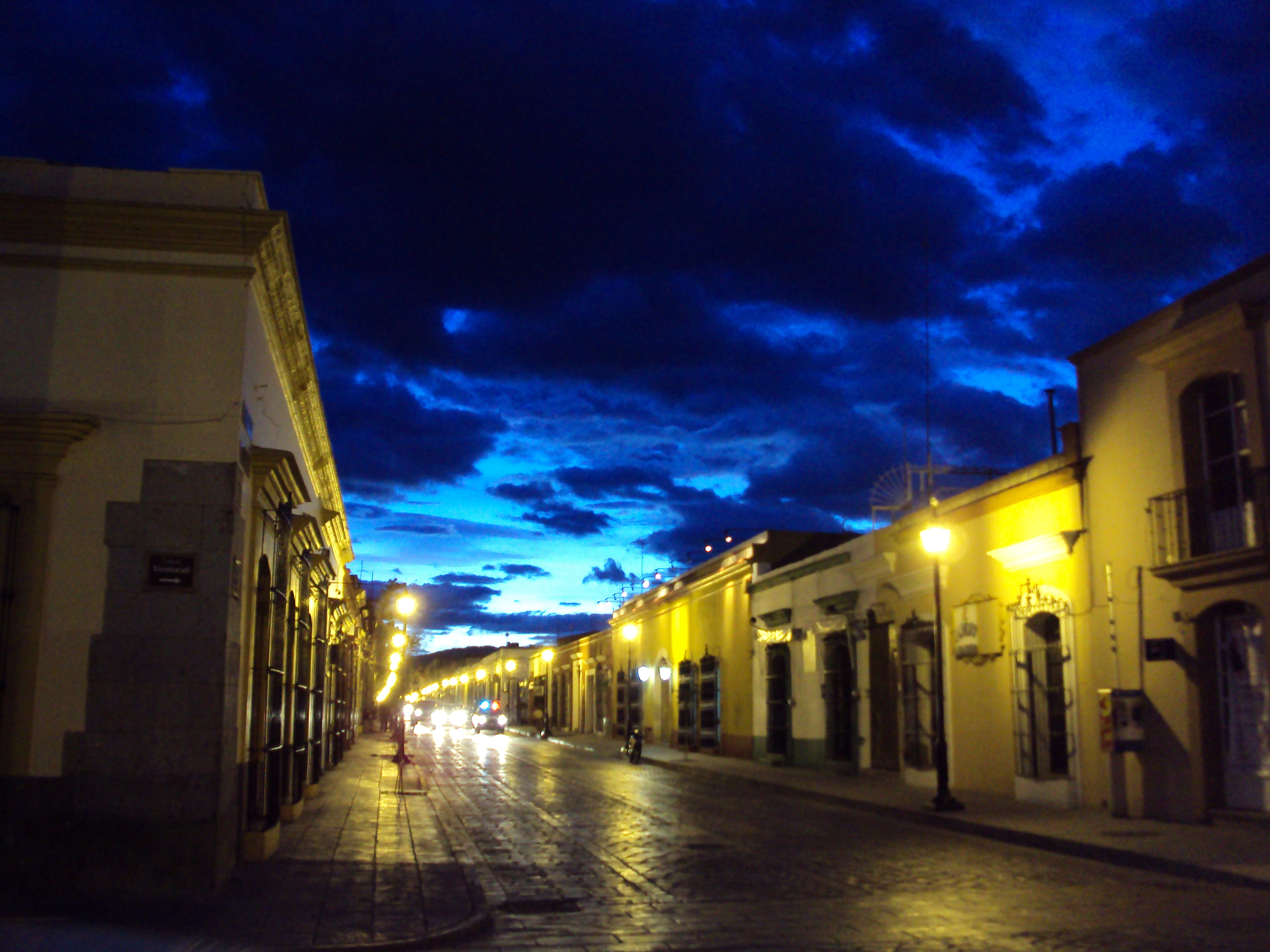
A street in downtown Oaxaca de Juárez.

- Historic Center of Oaxaca in Oaxaca City, Oaxaca: this World Heritage Site has many legends; one of the most famous is the legend of Matlazihua or Matlacihua, an evil entity who appears in the form of a beautiful Native American woman dressed in a large white transparent dress. She often seduces men, who she then leads to solitary places (such as an alley) where she kills them. She prefers machists and drunk men. According to some versions she is an incarnation of the Aztec goddess Mictlantecihuát, and according to others she is the ghost of an Indigenous Mexican woman who was raped and murdered during colonization and now seeks revenge.
- Jarquin in Mietchulan, Oaxaca: this small store is haunted by its anonymous former owner. The owner's apparition is known to walk in and out of the building. He is notorious for pushing customers out of the store.

== Puebla ==
- Chautla Hacienda in Puebla, Puebla: opened in 1777, it was an agave plantation and currently is an inn. Allegedly this site is haunted by several entities; the ghosts of a horseman and a boy were filmed on the site.

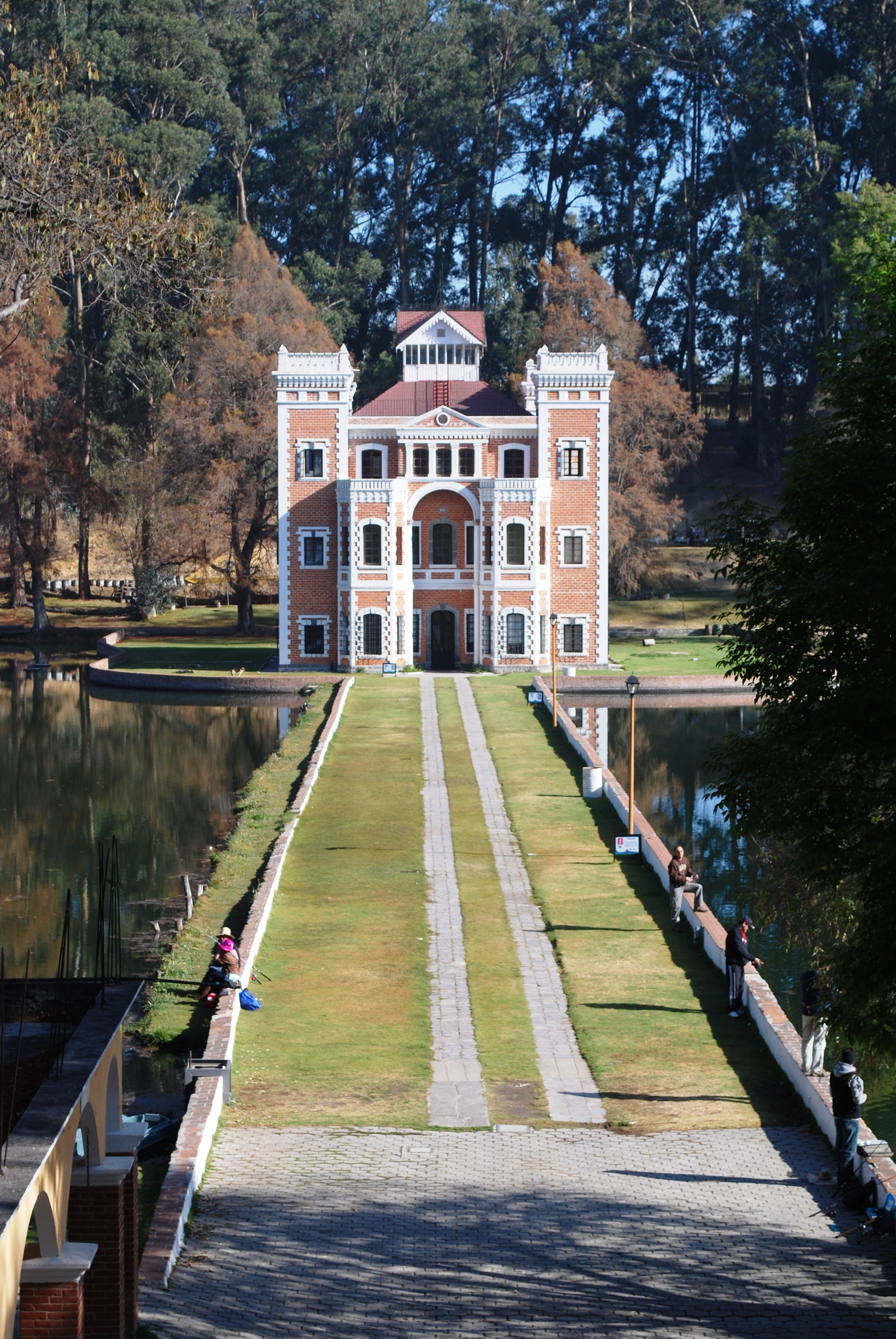
Chautla Hacienda.

- Instituto Cultural Poblano in Puebla, Puebla: built from 1740 to 1751, it was a Society of Jesus convent to 1767. After serving as a cemetery during the Typhus epidemic of 1812–1813, the property was used as a prison from 1841–1870 and the Penitentiary of Puebla operated until 1984, when it became a cultural center and museum. Allegedly the building is haunted by many ghosts of different shapes.
- Santa Mónica Religious Art Museum in Puebla, Puebla: built in 1606 as a poorhouse and orphanage. From 1686 to 1934, it served as an Augustinian Recollects convent. The religious abandoned the building by state order after a scandal when the conditions of cloister life were discovered. According to legend the former convent is the site of several paranormal events such as apparitions of a woman in white, apparitions of people wearing antique clothing who are seen wandering the installations, or the sound of nonexistent clocks.
- San Pedro Art Museum in Puebla, Puebla: formerly a hospital, government offices and a sports court, it is allegedly haunted by the ghosts of people buried under its courtyard when it was a hospital. Reports include the ghosts of a revolutionary soldier, people in old-fashioned clothes, and a little girl playing with a ball.

== Querétaro ==
- Casa de La Zacatecana: a colonial mansion in Santiago de Querétaro, Querétaro. In the 17th century, a woman known as "La Zacatecana" commanded the murder of her husband, and then executed the killer she hired for the murder herself. The legend says that the mansion harbours three spirits.
- Capilla de las Benditas Ánimas del Purgatorio in Colón, Querétaro: a Roman Catholic church founded with the objective of practicing exorcisms, the only one of its kind in the country.
- Claudia Mijangos house: located in a suburb of Querétaro, and where Claudia Mijangos killed her three children in 1989. She said that "... she was possessed by a demonic entity". To this day, neighbors claim that they can hear crying and shouting in the house and a boy appears in a window on the second level. The local government boarded the windows and built a wall around the house to deter vandalism and the curious public. Although the house is legally granted to Claudia Mijangos, it remains abandoned and unclaimed since her release in 2019. The home was subject of investigation by the Mexican paranormal television program, Extranormal.

== Quintana Roo ==
- Jungles of Quintana Roo: according to local legend, an evil entity known as Juan del Monte lives among the state jungles. This entity often imitates familiar human voices to attract visitors and cause them to get lost in the jungle. The legend of Juan del Monte originated in Native American folklore and is also told in other Mexican states such as Veracruz or Puebla. Other versions of the Juan del Monte legend paint the entity as a neutral entity who serves as a nature guardian.

== San Luis Potosí ==
- Cerro de San Pedro in Cerro de San Pedro, San Luis Potosí: a ghost town, which is allegedly haunted by a Guachichil boy who often interacts with people and tries to get them to enter one of the mines by offering them three golden oranges.

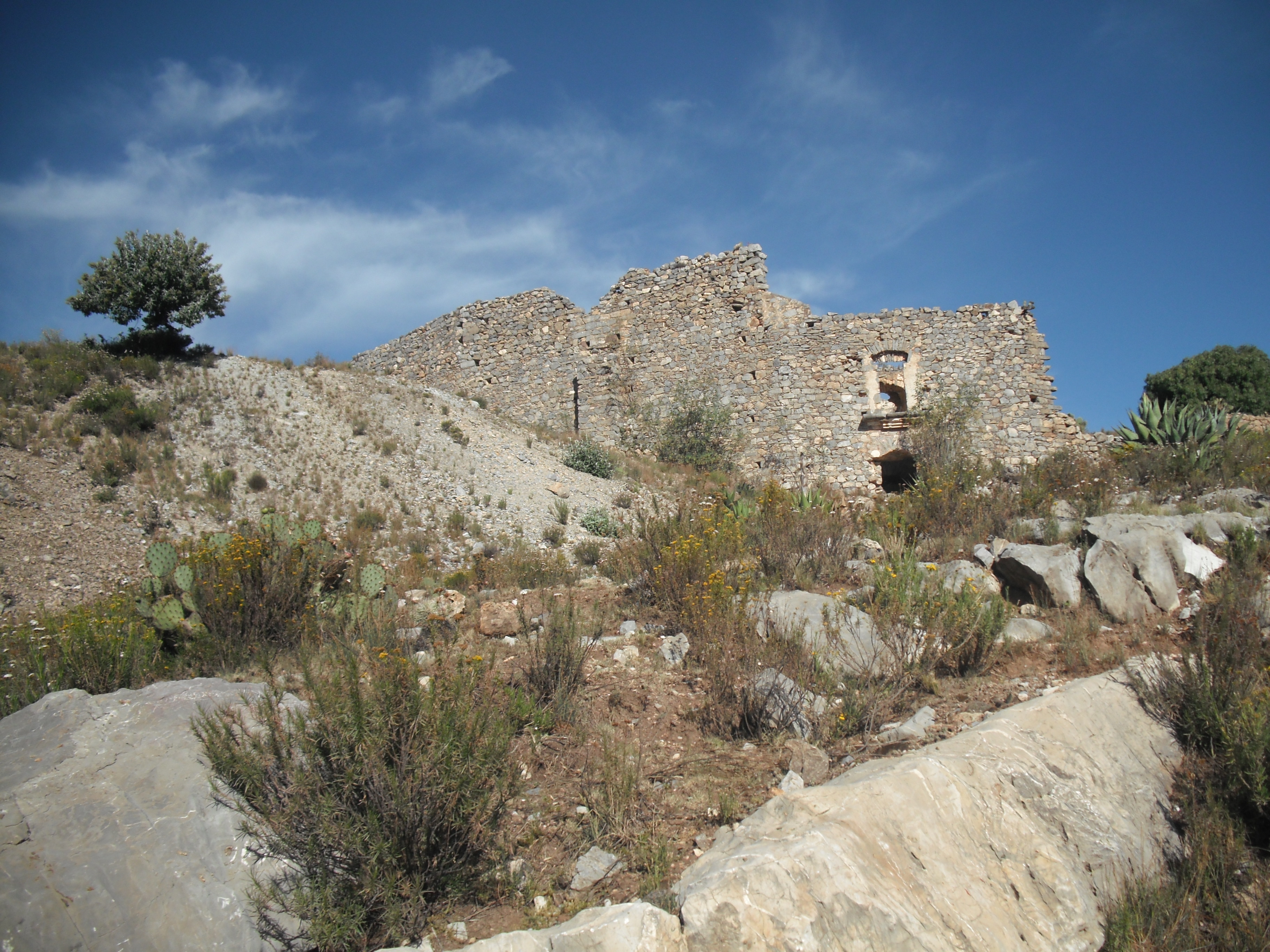
Abandoned mine in Real de Catorce, San Luis Potosí

- La Joya Honda in Soledad de Graciano Sánchez, San Luis Potosí: a 800m wide and 200m deep crater. According to legend, a group of bandits hid their treasure during the 1910s and their ghosts still watch over it. Other alleged paranormal phenomena reported are ghost witches and UFO sightings – allegedly, the Witches' Sabbath was often celebrated there in the past.
- Real de Catorce in Sierra de Catorce, San Luis Potosí: a ghost town founded in 1770 and abandoned in 1920; supposedly the town is haunted. According to legend one of the most active ghosts is an ancient miner known as "El Jergas", a benevolent entity who guides miners to new silver veins.

== Sinaloa ==
- Hospital General de Culiacán in Culiacán, Sinaloa: allegedly haunted by a nun and also by the ghost of La Planchada.

== Sonora ==
- Los Estralios Mines in San Carlos Nuevo Guaymas, Guaymas: alleged to be inhabited by a demon or a werewolf called "Neuale".

== State of Mexico ==
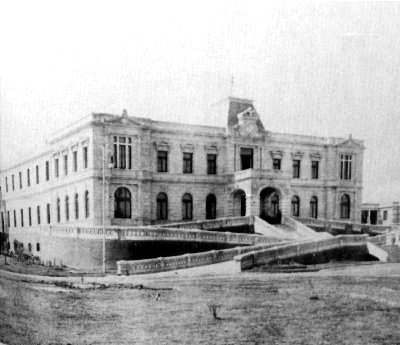
Central building of La Castañeda Psychiatric Hospital

- Lake Texcoco in Texcoco, State of Mexico: a murderous monster was said to live in the depths of this lake. The name of the beast is Ahuizotl. It was a canine mammal with spiky hair and a hand at the tip of its long tail. It ate humans. In order to attract people, it would produce a sound similar to that of an abandoned human baby crying. Its victims were caught by it and then were drowned in the lake. In Aztec mythology the souls of its victims were sent to Tlalocan.
- Lerma Marshes in San Miguel Almaya: a mermaid is said to live in the lakes and swamps. Her name is Tlanchana. She comes out of the marshes once or twice a year. She is beautiful and attractive. If a man follows her, he dies.
- Pilar Hacienda in San Juan Teotihuacán: built by the Spaniards who came to Mexico in the 16th century. On the top floor there is a large scratch on the window, which is believed to be the mark of Miguel Aritztia, a Spanish hidalgo. It is thought that he died from falling off the balcony, and before he fell he held on to the window, creating the long scratch. The ghost of Aritztia's wife has also been seen on the balcony crying "Oh, my husband." (in Spanish: Oh, mi esposo), She was there at the time of his death and tried to save him. Aritztia has been reported to be seen hanging from the window, as well as being seen in a window. It is said that at times the scratch disappears from the window.
- Asilo General La Castañeda or La Castañeda Psychiatric Hospital only exists in the central building in Amecameca: it was the biggest insane asylum in Mexico, opened in Mexico City during 1910; it was active for 58 years and during this time is said to have housed around 60,000 patients. Several paranormal cases have been reported in the hospital.

== Tlaxcala ==
- Matlalcueitl volcano and Cuatlapanga mount in La Malinche National Park: supposedly, a reptilian monster who lived on the Matlalcueitl mountain would come down during the rainy season to abduct children and take them up the mountain to be devoured. Other legends say that in Cualtlapanga, the sounds of a golden bell hidden there during the Mexican War of Independence were heard. Many people looked for it but no one found it.
Haunted mounts in La Malinche National Park

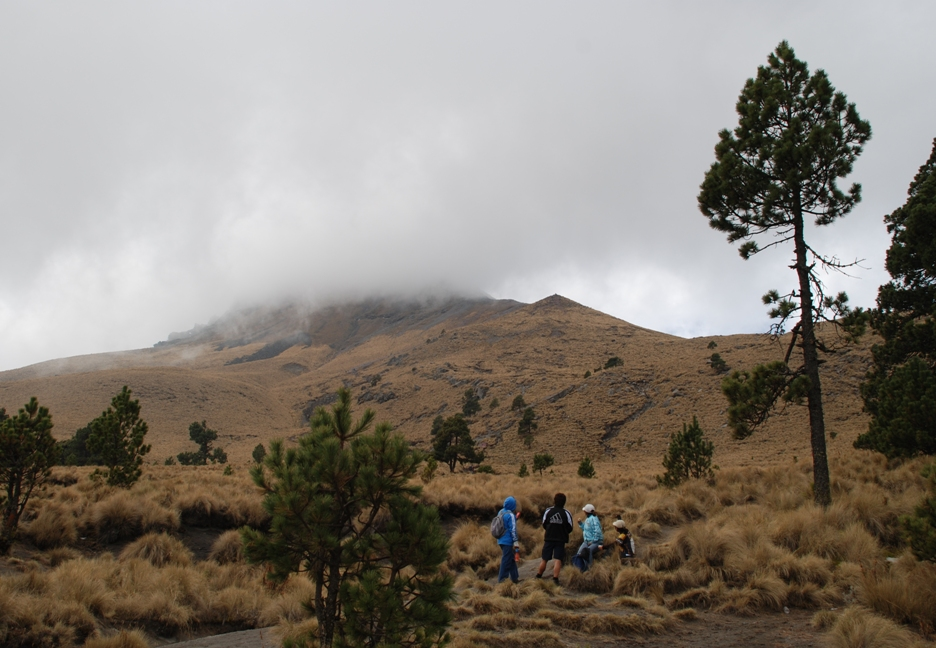
Matlalcueitl or Malinche volcano

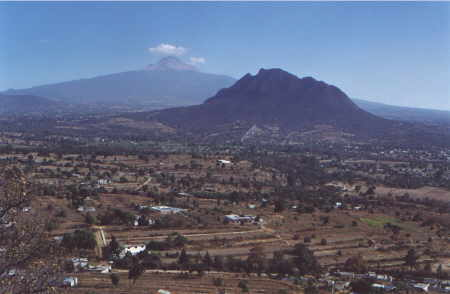
Cuatlapanga mount.
- Posada San Francisco Hotel in Tlaxcala City, Tlaxcala: a 16th-century inn, where according to local legend, the ghost of a little girl ghost who runs to different gardens searching for her mother can be seen. Voices and strange sounds are also reported there.

== Veracruz ==
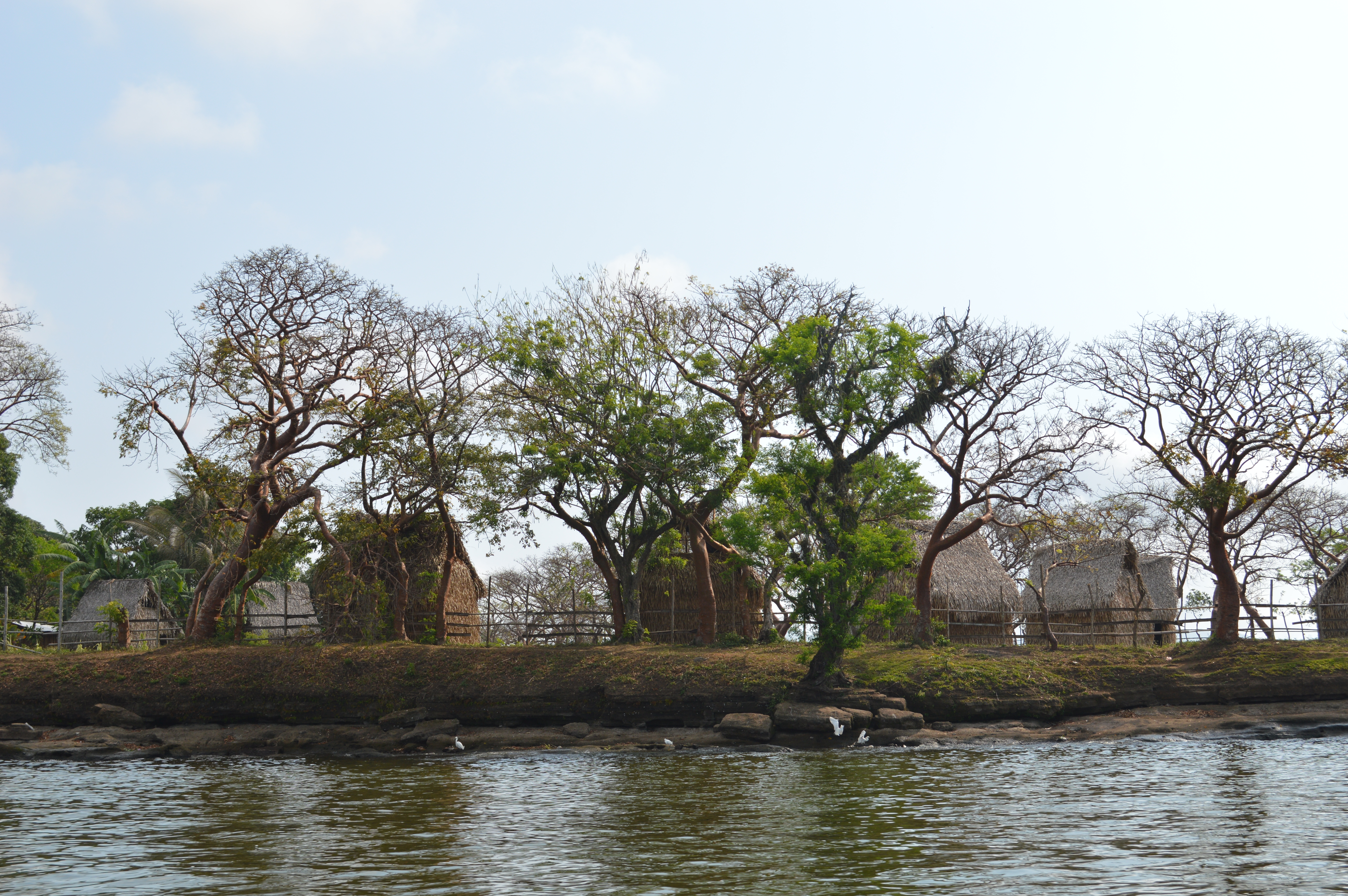
Chaman reunion in Catemaco, Veracruz

- Catemaco in Catemaco Municipality, Veracruz: internationally known as the "Wizard Capital", the history of the city dates from the 17th century. Each March, from 1774, the city celebrates Witches' Day, when practitioners and believers in witchcraft gather to practice ancient rituals. Several legends are told about the site, such as the legend of Cerro del Mono Blanco (White Monkey Mountain) where supposedly a man named Gonzalo Aguirre Pech, known as the "Great Wizard", sold his soul to the Devil.

== Yucatán ==
- Cecilio Chi Elementary School in Espita, Yucatán: according to a legend, there was a farmer who was a powerful warlock. He was able to obtain any vegetables or fruit from his farm regardless of the time of the year. Furthermore, he could get them in one day, which is not enough time for crops or trees to grow. It was rumoured that he was able to transform into a sinister flying monster known as the Uay Pop. After the suspected shapeshifter died it was said that the Uay Pop haunted the same place where the farm was located.

Pyramid of Kukulcán, Chichen Itza.

- Chichen Itza in Tinúm, Yucatán: an ancient Mayan city; according to some testimonies, the site is haunted by several entities, from ancient ghosts of sacrificed people and Aluxes – fairy-like spirits in Mayan folklore – to aliens.
- Cholul Hacienda in Mérida, Yucatán: a 19th-century henequen plantation which is now abandoned. According to legend several ancient owners of the plantation practiced witchcraft and Satanism, one of them in the form of an owl Other apparitions included were human shadows in the windows, a woman with a baby crying and an old plantation laborer who committed suicide after killing his fiancée's rapist.
- Hospital Peninsular in Merida, Yucatan: a hospital that operated as an illegal abortion clinic until 2009, when it was closed. According to popular testimonies alleged paranormal events reported on the site occurred in 2007, when the hospital was partially abandoned. A group of policemen entered it one night and said they heard babies crying. Their flashlights stopped working and some doors opened and closed by themselves.

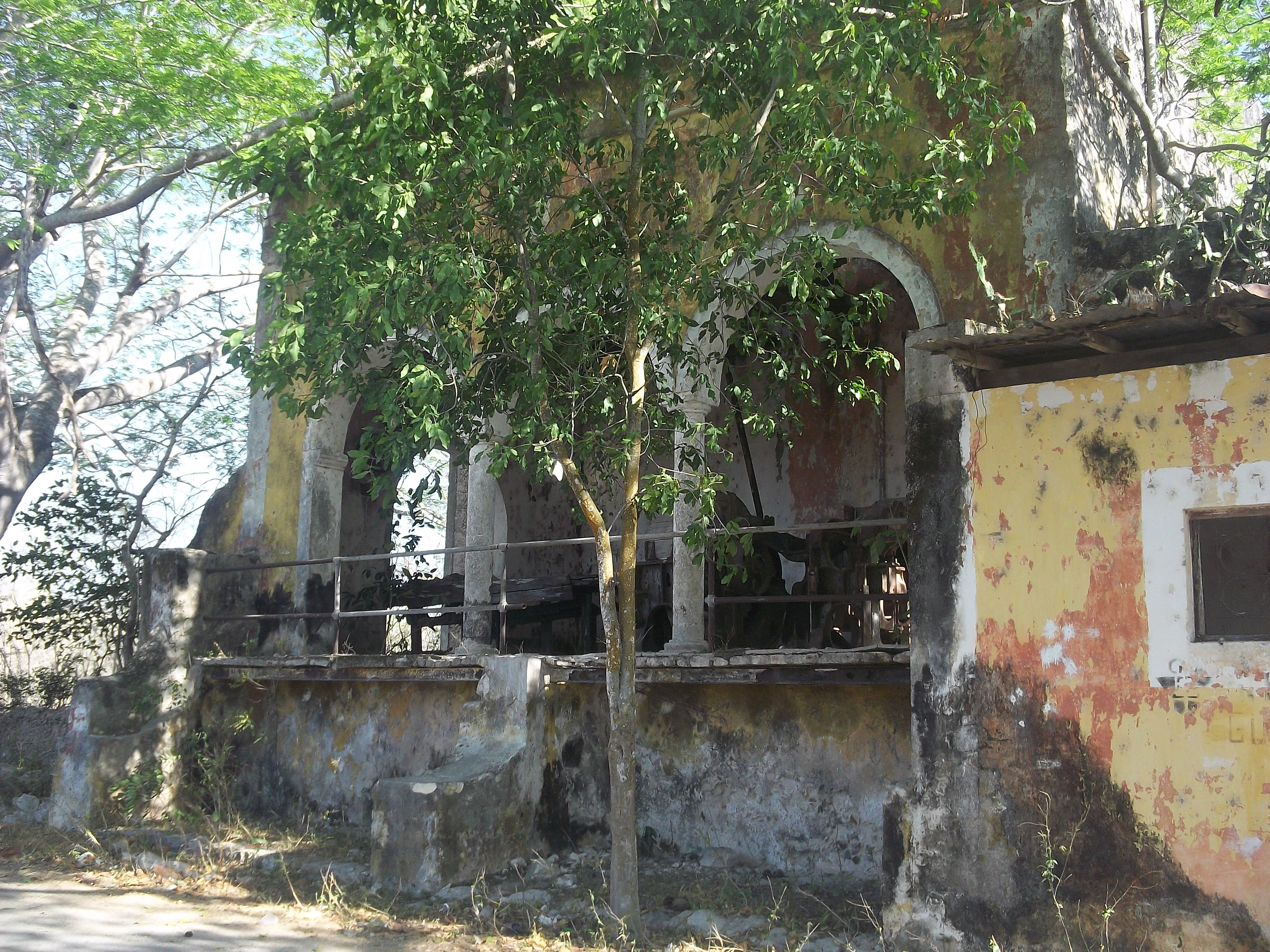
Ruines of Misnebalam Hacienda

- Misnebalam Hacienda and Village in Progreso, Yucatan: an abandoned 19th-century henequen plantation, it was a village of about 2000 people. Supposedly, witchcraft and public executions were common there. The most active ghost in the property is a boy named Julian who committed suicide after being raped during the 1920s. Legend also says a few Mexican folklore demons can be seen, such as the Xtabay and chaneque.
- Wyndham Mérida's Inn in Mérida, Yucatan: allegedly several entities haunted the building. According to employee testimonies, the most active entity is an old man who supposedly was buried under the property before the inn's construction.

== Zacatecas ==
- Meson de Jobito Hotel in Zacatecas, Zacatecas: built in 1700, and transformed into an inn during the 1940s, it was adapted into condominiums. From 1990 to 1993, the building was transformed into what now is the current hotel. Supposedly the hotel is one of the most haunted places in the country. Reported paranormal phenomena on the site included the feeling of being observed, children's voices and laughter, the same invisible children jumping on the beds, the sounds of horses and objects moving by themselves. This paranormal activity is concentrated in room 107.
- Historic Center of Zacatecas in Zacatecas, Zacatecas: this World Heritage Site has many legends. One of the most popular is the legend of Calle De Las Tres Cruces, where in 1761 two lovers— named Gabriel García and Beatriz Moncada— died in tragic circumstances. The legend says that the lover's ghosts appear on this street. Calle De Las Tres Cruces is on Hidalgo Avenue where it ends with Toledo Street. Another legend speaks of a haunted backstreet named Callejón del Indio Triste where Xolotl, one of the last leaders of the Chichimeca natives, died in the 1550s. Another alleged haunted backstreet is known as Callejón del Mono Prieto, where according to legend, in the 17th century a woman named Marciana Castillo died there. People believed that she practiced witchcraft and that she was responsible for a child's disappearance and the death of the same child's mother, and therefore she lived alone during her last days; she was burned alive when her house caught fire.
Haunted places in Zacatecas, Zacatecas

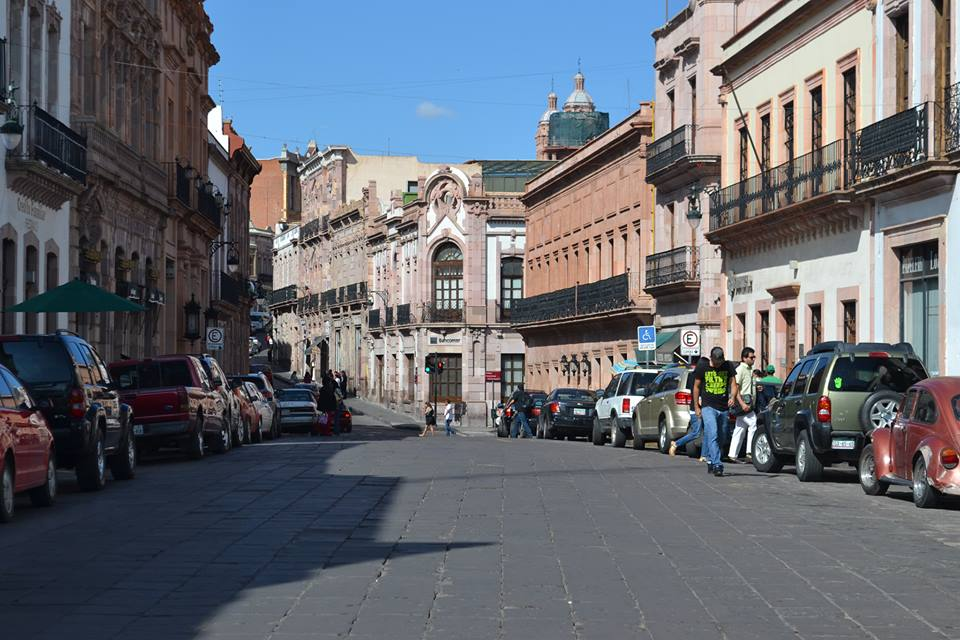
Hidalgo Avenue

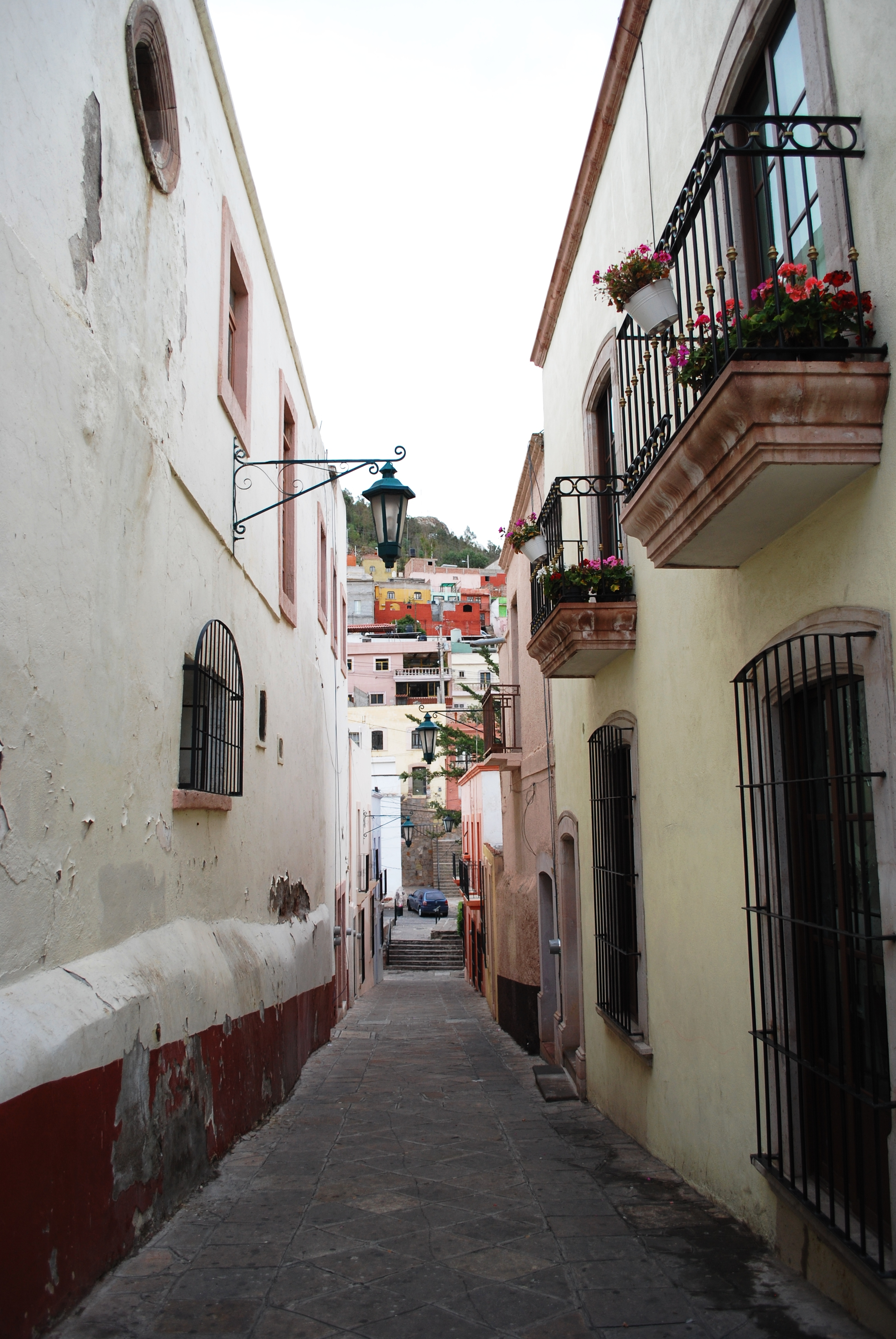
Callejón del indio triste
- Pateón Museo de Dolores in Jerez, Zacatecas: opened in 1809. Many legends are recounted about the cemetery such as the apparition of a man named Juan Juárez "el Melcocha", who was the first person buried here, and the paranormal phenomena associated with a paid mourning statue that allegedly moves and cries.

== See also ==
- Ghosts in Mexican culture
- Day of the Dead
- List of reportedly haunted locations
