= Ghosts in Mexican culture =

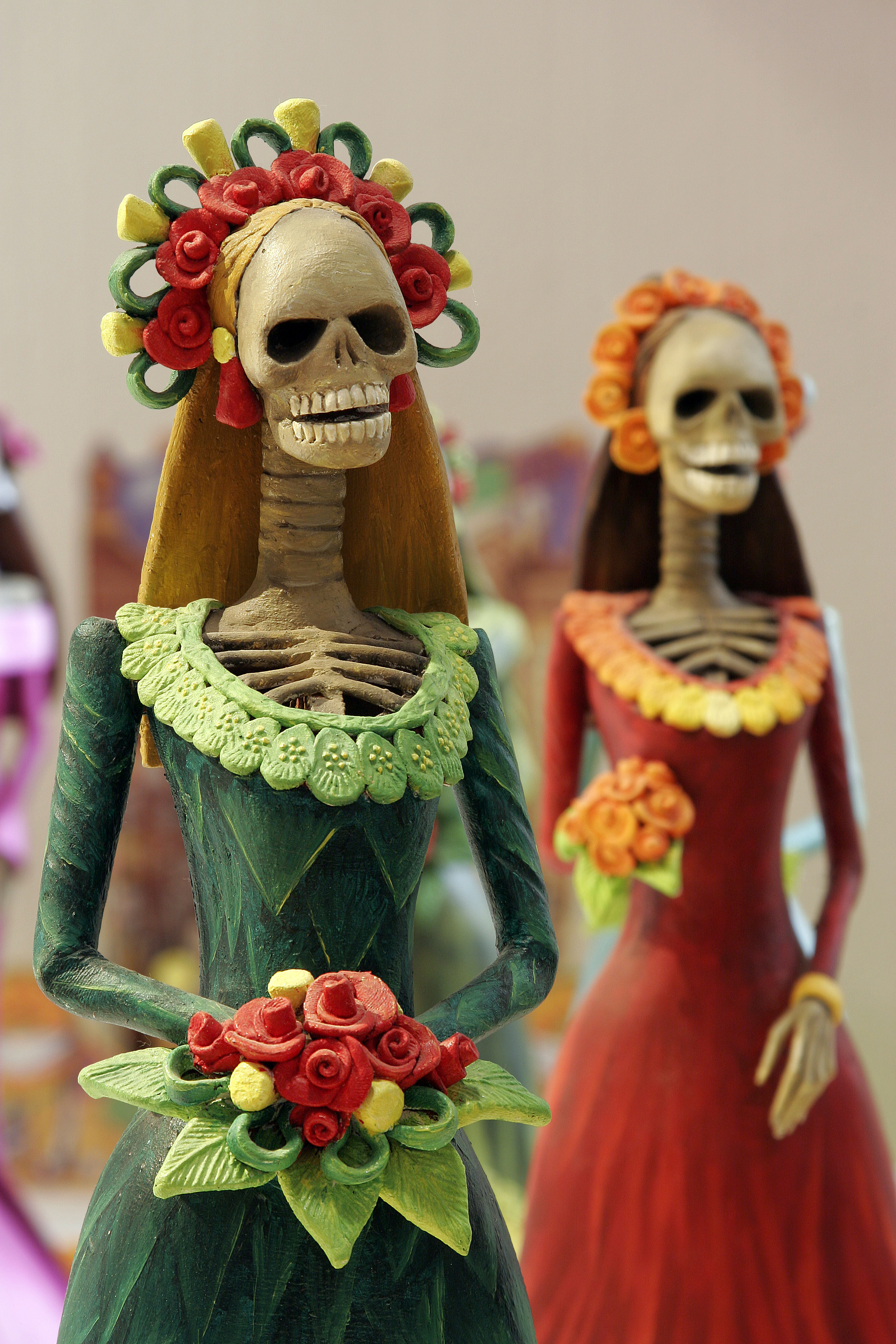
Catrinas, one of the most popular figures of the Day of the Dead celebrations in Mexico.

There are extensive and varied beliefs in ghosts in Mexican culture. In Mexico, the beliefs of the Maya, Nahua, Purépecha; and other indigenous groups in a supernatural world has survived and evolved, combined with the Catholic beliefs of the Spanish. The Day of the Dead (Spanish: "Día de muertos") incorporates pre-Columbian beliefs with Christian elements. Mexican literature and cinema include many stories of ghosts interacting with the living.

== Aztec beliefs ==
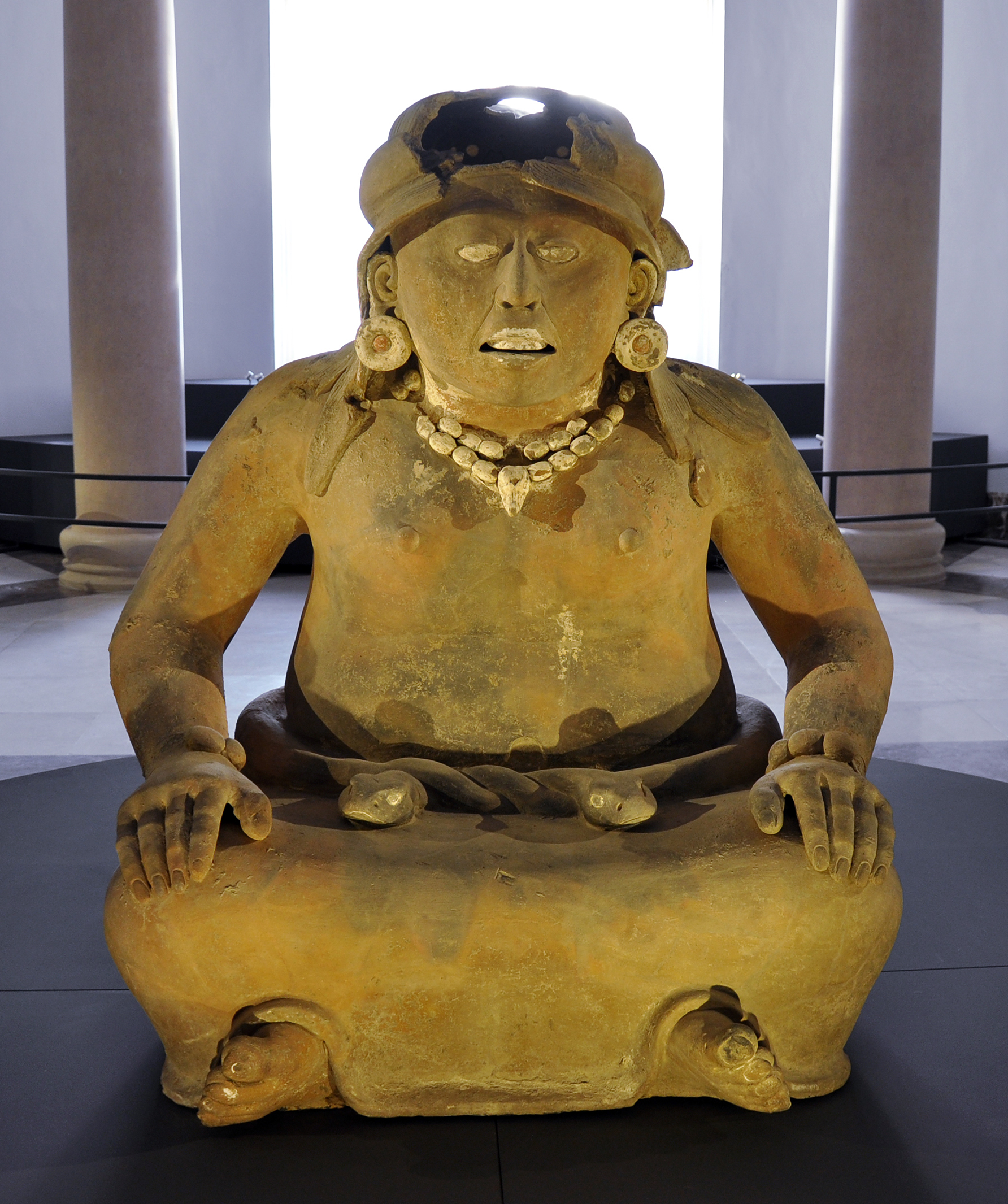
A terracotta statue of Cihuateotl, the Aztec goddess of women who died during childbirth.

After death, the souls of the Aztecs went to one of three places: Tlalocan, Mictlan, and the Sun. The Aztec idea of the afterlife for fallen warriors and women who died in childbirth was that their souls would be transformed into hummingbirds that would follow the sun on its journey through the sky. Those who drowned would go to Tlalocan, the first level of the upper worlds. Souls of people who died from less glorious causes would go to Mictlan, the lowest level of the underworld, taking four years and passing through many obstacles to reach this place.

The Cihuateteo, spirits of human women who died in childbirth, were not benevolent. On five specified days of the Aztec calendar they descended to earth and haunted crossroads, hoping to steal children whom they had not been able to have themselves.

The Cantares Mexicanos is an important collection of lyric poetry transcribed from Náhuatl into Roman letters around 1550 CE, about 30 years after the fall of Tenochtitlan. In his 1985 edition of these poems, John Bierhorst interprets the poems as "ghost songs" that were intended to summon the spirits of dead Aztec warriors back to earth to help their descendants under Spanish rule. If the songs were successful the ghosts would descend from heaven fully armed and ready to fight, demanding payment in human sacrifice. This interpretation is, however, controversial.

== Maya beliefs ==
The traditional Maya live in the continual presence of the "(grand)fathers and (grand)mothers", the usually anonymous, bilateral ancestors, who, in the highlands, are often conceived of as inhabiting specific mountains, where they expect the offerings of their descendants. In the past, Mayan ancestors had an important role to play, with the difference that, among the nobility, genealogical memory and patrilineal descent were much more emphasized. Thus, the Popol Vuh lists three genealogies of upper lords descended from three ancestors and their wives.

These first male ancestors - ritually defined as "bloodletters and sacrificers" - had received their private deities in a legendary land of origins called "The Seven Caves and Seven Canyons" (Nahua Chicomoztoc), and on their disappearance, left a sacred bundle. In Chiapas, at the time of the Spanish conquest, lineage ancestors were believed to have emerged from the roots of a ceiba tree. Comparable beliefs still exist amongst the Tz'utujiles.

== Purépecha beliefs ==
The Purépechas that live in what is now Michoacán believe that the monarch butterflies that travel toward their winter habitat (Monarch Butterfly Biosphere Reserve) symbolize the spirits of the dead as the spirits journey from the afterlife. There is the legend of Mintzita, the daughter of the Purépecha king, and her fiancé. Their ghosts arise and head toward a specific cemetery every Noche de Muertos. Noche de Muertos or Night of the Dead, a variation of Diá de Muertos, is a major holiday in the region in which custom involves the floating of hundreds of small candles on Lake Pátzcuaro and other bodies of water. Michoacán is even known as El alma de Mexico or the soul of Mexico.

== Day of the Dead ==
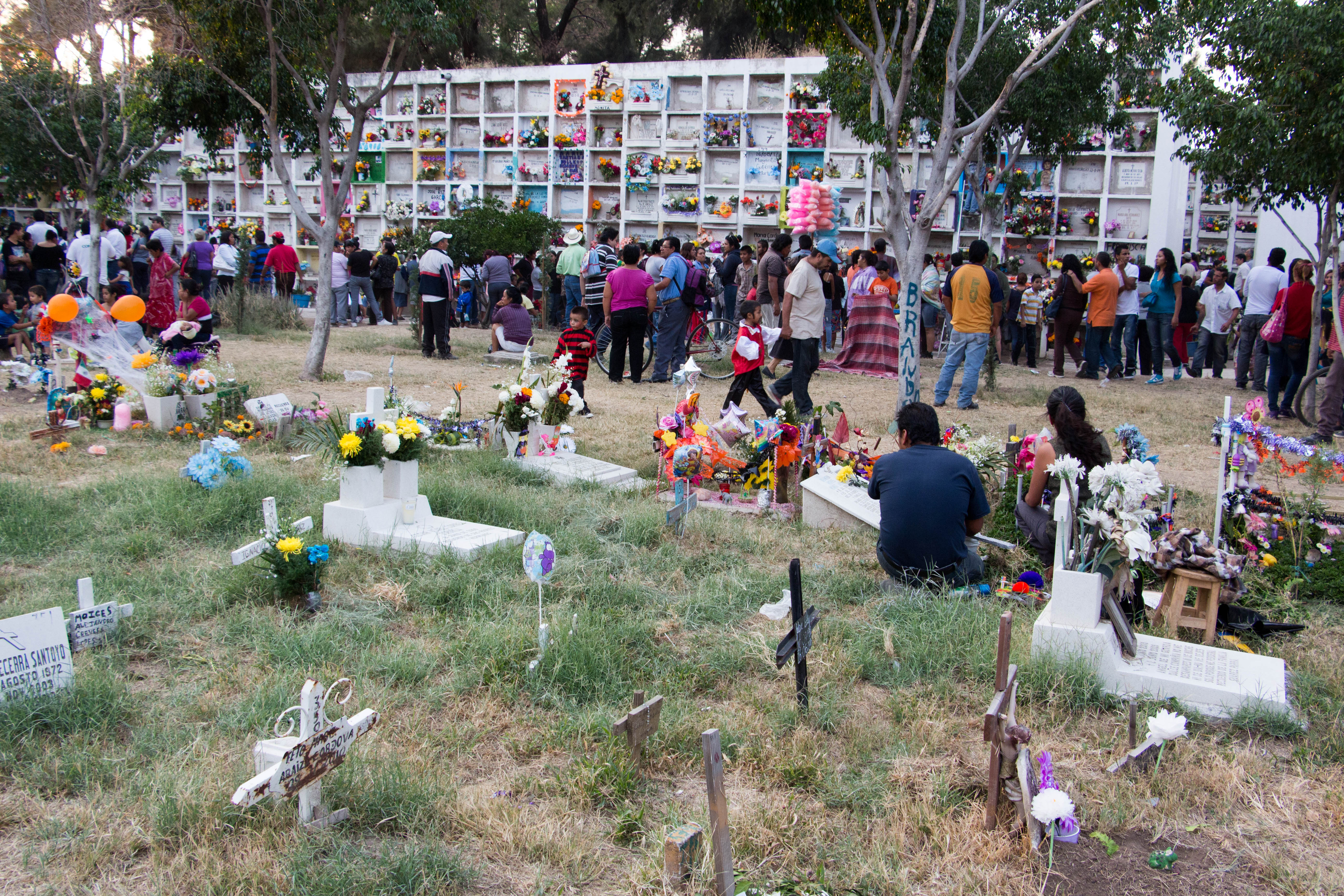
Day of the Dead at a Mexican cemetery.

The Day of the Dead (Spanish: El Día de los Muertos) is a holiday celebrated in Mexico and by Mexicans and Central Americans living in the United States and Canada. The holiday focuses on gatherings of family and friends to pray for and remember friends and family members who have died. The celebration occurs on November 1 and 2 in connection with the Catholic holidays of All Saints' Day (November 1) and All Souls' Day (November 2).

Traditions connected with the holiday include building private altars honoring the deceased using sugar skulls, marigolds, and the favorite foods and beverages of the departed, and visiting graves with these as gifts. Due to occurring directly after Halloween, the Day of the Dead is sometimes thought to be a similar holiday, both being in the family of Allhallowtide.

Mexican academics are divided on the exact origins of The Day of the Dead celebrations. Most consider it a mixture of both indigenous roots and European Catholic traditions. Rituals celebrating the deaths of ancestors have been observed by these indigenous civilizations perhaps for as long as 2500–3000 years. The festival that became the modern Day of the Dead fell in the ninth month of the Aztec calendar, about the beginning of August, and was celebrated for an entire month. However, current modern-day depictions of the festival have more in common with Catholic European traditions of the Danse Macabre. Archaeologist Augustin Sanchez Gonzalez notes how the festival was moved towards the end of October and early November by the Spaniards to syncretize with the Catholic Allhallowtide.

People go to cemeteries to communicate with the souls of the departed who are paying a holiday visit home. The descendants build private altars, containing the favorite foods and beverages, as well as photos and memorabilia, of the departed. The intent is to encourage visits by the souls, so that the souls will hear the prayers and the comments of the living directed to them.

In most regions of Mexico, November 1 honors children and infants, whereas deceased adults are honored on November 2. This is indicated by generally referring to November 1 mainly as "Día de los Inocentes" (Day of the Innocents) but also as "Día de los Angelitos" (Day of the Little Angels) and November 2 as "Día de los Muertos" or "Día de los Difuntos" (Day of the Dead).

== Modern ghost legends ==
=== La Llorona ===
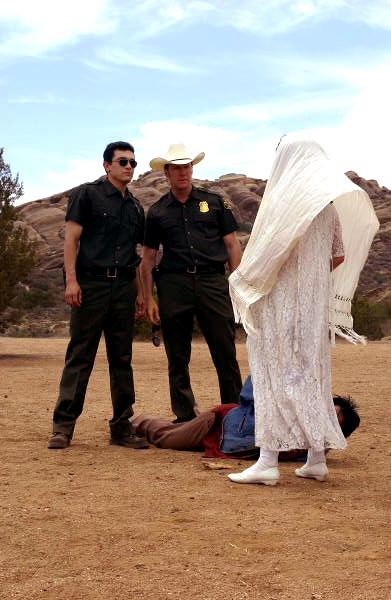
From a film La Llorona.

"La Llorona" is Spanish for "The Weeping Woman" and is a popular legend in all Spanish-speaking cultures in the colonies of the Americas, with many versions extant. The basic story is that La Llorona was a beautiful woman who killed her children to be with the man that she loved and was subsequently rejected by him. He might have been the children's father who had left their mother for another woman, or he might have been a man she loved but who was uninterested in a relationship with a woman with children, and whom she thought she could win if the children were out of the way.

She drowned the children and then, after being rejected anyway, killed herself. She is doomed to wander, vainly searching for her children for all eternity. Her constant weeping is the reason for her name. She is said to haunt near bodies of water such as rivers and lakes. In some cases, according to the tale, she will kidnap wandering children or children who misbehave.

=== La Pascualita ===
La Popular Store in Chihuahua, Chihuahua is a wedding boutique which is home to a mannequin that is allegedly an embalmed corpse. According to many witnesses, it moves, blinks and sometimes walks on its own. The story dates back to the 1930s. The mannequin is known as "Pascualita", or "Chonita". According to the legend, a bride was bitten by a spider or scorpion on the day before her wedding, causing her death. The bereft mother (who is the one named "Pascualita"), saddened beyond consolation, hired the best funerary services money could buy and had her daughter embalmed, dressed in the wedding gown, and later displayed the corpse, passing it off as a mannequin. Some versions claim that it was her fiancé that had her embalmed. It is common for late night taxi drivers to notice the mannequin take life, as the bride's intended was a taxi driver himself. In 2017, the mannequin was taken out of the wedding boutique for the first time and displayed in Mexico City, Mexico as part of Hotel de Leyendas Victoria tour.

=== La Planchada ===
La Planchada (Spanish for “The Ironed One”) is a figure in Mexican folklore, commonly described as the ghost of a nurse who appears in hospitals. Unlike many supernatural legends, La Planchada is generally regarded as a benevolent spirit said to comfort patients, provide care, or complete medical tasks when staff are unavailable. The legend is especially associated with Mexico City and reflects themes of devotion, guilt, and redemption.

The legend is often traced to the early or mid-20th century, particularly to Hospital Juárez (formerly San Pablo Hospital) in Mexico City. Reports of ghostly nurses began circulating by the 1930s, a period during which Mexico’s medical institutions and nursing practices underwent significant modernization.

In many retellings, the spirit is linked to a nurse named Eulalia, known for her strict professionalism and immaculate uniform, which earned her the nickname La Planchada.

In popular versions of the story, Eulalia falls in love with a physician—sometimes named Joaquín or Santiago—and becomes engaged to him. After discovering that the doctor has married another woman, she falls into a deep depression. Her grief begins to affect her work, leading to medical negligence and deteriorating health.

Consumed by shame and remorse, Eulalia eventually dies. According to the legend, her spirit returns to hospitals to atone for her mistakes by caring for the sick and assisting other medical staff.

La Planchada is typically depicted as a nurse wearing a perfectly ironed white uniform, polished shoes, and neat hair. In some accounts, she appears surrounded by a faint glow or accompanied by a clean, antiseptic scent. Witnesses generally describe her as quiet, composed, and seen most often during late-night shifts in hospital corridors.

Alternate names for the figure include La Enfermera Fantasma (“The Phantom Nurse”) and La Dama de Blanco (“The Lady in White”). Regional variants of the story emphasize either Eulalia’s personal tragedy or her symbolic role as an idealized caregiver.

Sightings of La Planchada are reported across Mexico, with frequent accounts from hospitals in Mexico City, such as Hospital Juárez and the Iztapalapa Children’s Hospital. Reports typically describe patients receiving care—such as being repositioned, comforted, or having vital signs checked—from a nurse who does not appear on shift records. When staff arrive, the tasks are often already completed.

Some stories include brief spoken interactions, such as whispered reassurances or instructions. A widely circulated account from 2006, described by physician Ulises Nava, involves a patient in the State of Mexico who claimed to have been visited by a nurse not employed at the facility.

Folklorists and scholars often interpret La Planchada as a symbol of idealized nursing devotion and the moral weight of caregiving. The legend has been described as reflecting anxieties surrounding hospital care, institutional trust, and the consequences of medical error.

Skeptical interpretations suggest that reported sightings may arise from exhaustion among hospital workers, patients’ fear or confusion, or misidentifications of uniformed staff.

The story of La Planchada is commonly retold during Día de los Muertos celebrations, at family gatherings, and at folklore festivals throughout Mexico. She frequently appears in ghost story collections, radio programs, and television segments focusing on regional legends.

The figure continues to serve as a cultural symbol of compassion, vigilance, and redemption within healthcare settings.

=== Vanishing hitchhiker ===
In the Mexican version of the Vanishing hitchhiker urban legend, the hitchhiker is a beautiful woman, who chats with a stranger in a taxi. When she leaves as a normal person she leaves her address. When the person tries to reach the woman at her home, he is informed the woman is dead and that it is also the anniversary of her death.

=== Cemetery hauntings ===
Often there are ghost legends associated with the older cemeteries. For example, the Panteón de Belén (also Santa Paula Cemetery), a historical cemetery located in Guadalajara, Mexico, is the site of legends and night tours. The cemetery was opened in 1848 and it was formally closed in 1896. Legends that are part of the local folklore include the Vampire, The Pirate, The Lovers, The Monk, The Child Afraid of the Dark, The Story of José Cuervo, The Nun and many more.

=== El Charro Negro ===
The Charro Negro is a ghost of Mexican folklore that, according to popular traditions, is described as a tall man, with an elegant appearance, in an impeccable black suit consisting of a short jacket, a shirt, tight pants and a wide-brimmed hat who wanders in the depth of the night in the streets of Mexico on the back of a huge jet-colored horse. He is of Mexican origin, and is related to the Devil. It has also served as Mexican cultural inspiration for literature and cinema such as La Leyenda del Charro Negro. According to some, the legend of El Charro Negro arises from the syncretism in 1920 between indigenous and European beliefs. El Charro Negro represents the dark side of the human soul, a story that warns of blinding greed. This character was transmuted into dark deities by ethnic groups such as the Wixárika. Among the Huichol deities, which are linked to a dark part are defined as "Neighbors" or "Mestizos", the one that stands out the most within these deities is the god Tamatsi Teiwari Yuawi, which in Spanish is called "Our Big Brother the Dark Blue Mestizo". The result of the meeting of these two cultures, also unites two religions; the Mesoamerican (specifically the Huichol) and from Spain, the result will be a Mestizo popular culture, which creates a figure of Ibero-American folklore, that is, the "Charro Negro".

The coexistence between the indigenous and mestizo culture resulted in economic conflicts, where they took over land to use it for their own benefit, for trade, etc. According to sociological records, the god "Mestizo Azul", within the indigenous culture, specifically within the Huichol culture, represents the stereotype of the colonizer who threatens his culture. This god "Mestizo Azul" is more powerful than the Huichol gods themselves, however, he is a despot, a collector and does not know forgiveness.

From a Mixtec perspective, it is said that El Charro Negro is the "patron of the place" who lives on the top of the mountain, caretaker of the region, this individual does not have indigenous aspects, on the contrary, he tells us about characteristics of the colonizers, that is, a white man, tall and mounted on horseback. The Mixtecos speak of how dangerous it can be to find it, that is why they have the belief of carrying garlic, to be able to drive it away. This "lord of the hill" punishes those who cause destruction in the forests, guards the treasures and punishes those who commit greed. Such is the importance of the "Lord of the Hill" that the indigenous people asked for permission with offerings in order to obtain permission to work on their lands. The offerings consisted of cigarettes, mezcal, and food.

There is an anecdote recorded, in the Sierra del Norte de Puebla, where the indigenous people stopped working on a highway, since the permission of the "lord of the hill" had not been requested.

San Martín de Caballero, is known in the cities as a saint who is asked for money with the phrase "San Martín de Caballero, give me a little money" while alfalfa is offered to his horse. While in the Mazatec culture he becomes a nocturnal being, where they explain that he is not a saint. He is known as the owner of the lands and the mountains. His characteristics are those of colonizers, he is white and greets in Castilian. Some nights he comes down to visit his animals and watch over the buried treasures. Those who wish to obtain money from this being, must go in a state of indulgence (sexual abstinence) and offer cocoa or a turkey. San Martín de Caballero, gives them instructions, which include, take his horse by the tail to the applicant's house and not say anything in 4 years, if this promise is broken then the applicant's soul is condemned, he dies instantly and San Martín de Caballero takes his body and soul to take them to work with him.

In practically all societies the concept of "the dark" has been conceived, which is even presented as an essential element for balance to exist. And this, the dark, is a kind of constant temptation, linked to human passions, which could make man lose his reason, and as a consequence, lose himself or the luminous part of him .

In the Mexica worldview we have the unforgettable cosmic battle between day and night, between light and darkness symbolized by Tezcatlipoca, one of the four sons of Ometéotl, lord of the night; and Quetzalcóatl (also called the white Tezcatlipoca) .

With the arrival of Christianity in Mexico, dualism was also propelled with the figure of God and Lucifer, and in this cultural bifurcation myths and legends arose about the perennial temptation that is capable of making the soul perish.

== Legend of El Charro Negro ==
El Charro Negro is a Mexican ghost legend of a ghostly man dressed in a charro or vaquero (cowboy) suit who stalks the streets of cities and rural roads at night. Being mysterious, he sometimes accompanies walkers, but if the person agrees to get on the horse or receives coins from the phantom, his luck is given. El Charro Negro always appears dressed in an elegant black charro suit with fine details in gold and silver. He can be seen riding on his horse, the same black color, whose eyes look like balls of fire. El Charro Negro only appears to people who walk alone, mainly at night. El Charro Negro has appeared in the novel Macario, from which the legend was utilized and inspired to create a film with the same name. In 2018, the animated film La Leyenda del Charro Negro was released, created by Anima Studios, where El Charro Negro appears as the main antagonist of the film, as well as the franchise in general.

== In the arts ==
- Woman Hollering Creek and Other Stories is a book of short stories published in 1991 by San Antonio-based Mexican-American writer Sandra Cisneros. The title story is a modern version of the legend of La Llorona.
- Hasta el viento tiene miedo (Even the Wind has Fear or Even the Wind is Scared) is a 1968 Mexican horror film, written and directed by Carlos Enrique Taboada. The film is about a ghost that seeks revenge in a school for girls. A remake was released for the Halloween season of 2007 with Martha Higareda as the protagonist.
- Kilometer 31 (Kilómetro 31 or km 31) is a 2007 Mexican horror film, written and directed by Rigoberto Castañeda. The film is inspired by the Crying Woman legend (La Llorona) and legends about highway ghosts.
- The Cartoon Network series Victor and Valentino features many depictions of classic Latin and Mesoamerican culture in a more comedic and family-oriented manner:
  - La Llorona appears in the episode "Lonely Haunts Club 3: La Llorona" and is depicted as suffering from empty nest syndrome. She is simply lonely and wants people to visit her which the titular characters and their friends agree to do once a month.
  - La Planchada appears in her self-titled episode and is depicted as a two-dimensional ghostly apparition that can summoned by leaving an iron out at night and coughing three times. She lays herself on the ill and soothes them back into wellness. However, she has a moral standing as she threatened to flatten Victor out due to him inconsiderately spreading chicken pox to the other kids.

== See also ==
- Folktales of Mexico
- Santa Muerte
- List of reportedly haunted locations in Mexico
