= House of Laments =

House of Laments Museum
- Casa de los Lamentos
- House of Laments
- Alternative names: House of Don Tageo Fulgencio Mejía

General information
- Status: Protected for local and state legislation
- Architectural style: Spanish Colonial, Baroque
- Location: Guanajuato, Mexico, Guanajuato, Mexico
- Completed: 1890
- Owner: Samantha Smith (actuality)

The House of Laments (Spanish: "Casa de los lamentos") is a historic place in Guanajuato, Guanajuato, Mexico. The mansion dates to the 18th century. During the 1890s and 1900s, the Tadeo Fulgencío Mejía serial murders occurred here. He was a Mexican serial killer motivated by the idea of contacting his deceased wife. Now the house functions as museum, and the local legend says several paranormal phenomena happen in the mansion.

== History ==
During the 18th century, the Marquess of San Clemente commanded the construction of the mansion, for his daughter. In the 19th century the house was a post office until 1890 when Tadeo Fulgencío Mejía, a De Cata y de Mellano mining engineer, bought the property.

=== The Tadeo Mejía crimes ===
Tadeo Mejía's wife, Constanza de la Rivera, died in 1890 during an assault. According to some versions, the murder of Constanza occurred during a domestic invasion orchestrated by employees of the mine where Mejía worked, they accused him of malversation but really the mine suffered an economic crisis and for this reason the salaries had been late. Constanza was stabbed in the neck. According to other versions, Constanza died on a street close to the house.

Supposedly, her death caused the psychosis of Tadeo Mejía. He consulted with a "witch", who showed him strange rituals that included human sacrifices of young men and women. Tadeo Mejía committed an unknown number of murders, but several human bones were located in the mansion's basement.

== See also ==
- List of serial killers by country
