= Casa Negra =

House in Roma Norte, Mexico City

- The house in 2020
- Alternative names: Casa Mondragón

General information
- Location: Roma Norte, Cuauhtémoc, Mexico City, Avenida Álvaro Obregón 212
- Coordinates: 19.41709°N 99.16457°W

Casa Negra (Spanish for "Black House"), also known as Casa Mondragón, is a house at the corner of Avenida Insurgentes Sur and Avenida Álvaro Obregón in Roma Norte, Mexico City. It is associated with an urban legend about a hospital fire and the unexplained deaths of a family, and has been a stop on ghost tours.

== Building ==
The house's architecture has been described as Porfirian. In 2019, its black-painted walls bore graffiti, and street stalls obscured parts of the exterior. Diego Cera of Local.mx likened it to a ruined castle and reported trash and old mattresses inside. The building remained unused and in poor condition in October 2025.

== Legend ==
=== Pérez Gay (Milenio) ===
Rafael Pérez Gay, in his column in the newspaper 'Milenio', tells of a legend as follows:

- A fire in 1916, during a typhus epidemic (“tifo”)
- The original owners had left the house empty after fleeing the Mexican Revolution
- Neighbors, stirred up by the Roman Catholic Church, locked the doors from outside and set the house on fire
- All the inmates died, and no one was ever put on trial for arson
- A certain Mondragón family bought the house in the 1920s
- Police found the parents and two small children dead in their beds, with no sign of violence

=== Other press ===
Other press coverage reports slightly different details:

- The house served as an improvised hospital for people with typhoid fever around 1935, during the presidency of Lázaro Cárdenas
- Neighbors believed the patients were possessed by demons and set fire to the building
- Patients and medical staff died in the fire
- The structure was not seriously damaged, was repaired, and was then sold to the Mondragón family.
- The family—two parents and their three (not two) children—supposedly died from unexplained causes a week or so after moving in
- The house then passed into government hands
- After that, over time, reports of screams, other noises, sudden cold, and apparitions of children.

=== Credibility of stories ===
Chilango noted in 2021 that contemporary newspapers did not recount the alleged fire. Time Out México likewise reported no records of the story in newspaper archives. In 2024, Infobae stated that the supernatural claims were unproven and that the stories about the house might simply be products of local imagination.

== In popular culture ==
The house has featured in horror-themed tours. The itinerary advertised for the Tour del Terror CDMX in 2025 included Casa Negra, the Hotel Posada del Sol and Casa País de los Duendes.

Diego Covarrubias's short story "La casa negra" appeared in issue 60 of Revista BiCentenario, in its "Cuento histórico" section. The narrator is hired to restore the house.
