= House of the Count De la Torre Cosío y la Cortina =

Coordinates: 19.430142°N 99.133855°W

House of the Counts of la Torre Cosío y la Cortina
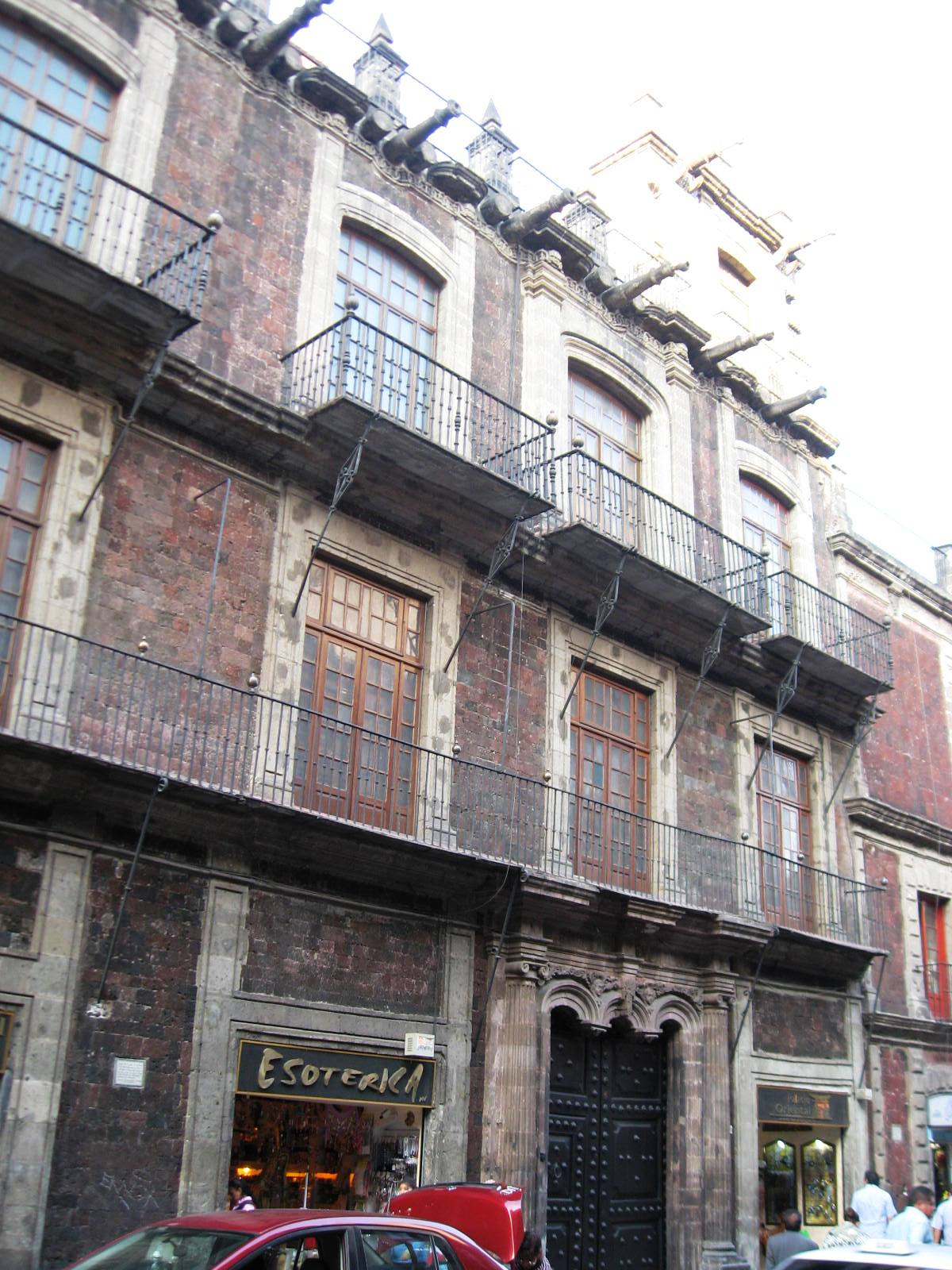
- Torre de Cossio house on Republica de Uruguay Street.

General information
- Architectural style: New Spanish Baroque
- Location: Mexico City, Mexico

The house of the Counts of la Torre Cosío y la Cortina, located on 94 Republica de Uruguay Street in the historic center of Mexico City was built in 1781 and the scene for one of Mexico City's legends. The house is considered to be a fine example of civil architecture of the 18th century, shortly after the First Count De la Cortina received his noble title in 1773. The most notable member of this family would be Justo Gómez de la Cortina who was an important social and political figure in New Spain at the beginning of the 19th century.

== History ==
The previous house at this location belonged to a rich Spanish merchant named Juan Manuel González de Cossio, which was built over the former residence of Juan Manuel Sotomayor. González de Cossio received his title from the Spanish crown in 1773. The mansion itself was built in 1781. Despite being declared a national monument in 1931, the building was partially destroyed to make way to 20 de Noviembre Avenue. Also, nothing of the interior of the building has survived as it has long been adapted for commercial use.

== Legend ==
Only small remnants of the original interior remain as it has been greatly modified over the years. Legend has it that González de Cossio suspected that his wife was cheating on him, despite others’ insistence to the contrary. This man sought out a curandero (a kind of healer/magician) who recommended that Juan Manuel kill the first man to pass by his house at 11pm. Juan Manuel decided to take this advice and before killing his victim, he asked the time, then proclaimed “You are indeed fortunate, for you know the very hour of your death.” Juan Manuel went on to kill a number of other victims, then repented of his actions. He died mysteriously while performing the penance ordered by his priest.

== Façade ==
The façade has a symmetrical design with three floors.

- Main portal: The main portal has a trilobite arch of carved stone. The door still contains the original metal studs, which were a sign of wealth in the 18th century.
- Covering: it is covered in tezontle (a reddish porous stone) and the window and door frame are done in chiluca, a grayish-white rock; as such it is considered a prototype of the palatial constructions to very soon follow.
- Entrance: the entrance is flanked by columns and the lintel decorated with small stone heads.
- Second floor: has a wide balcony with ironwork railings which rests on the main portal. ane four central doorways
- Frieze: At the end of the building, there is a frieze decorated with linked chains which frame small fleur-de-lis.
- Figures: Above this geometric figures top the cresting with pinnacles. The building still has it original gargoyles in the shape of cannons, which were put there as a reminder that the owner was a captain-general in the military. The square corner tower is patterned after conquistador-age buildings.
- Turret: Topping all of this is a tile-covered turret on a tower with decorative bastions reminiscent of the 16th century, and cannon-shaped gargoyles.
