= Panteón de Belén =

Historic cemetery in Guadalajara, Jalisco

Coordinates: 20°41′15″N 103°20′42″W

Panteón de Belén (also Santa Paula Cemetery) is a historic cemetery located in Guadalajara, Jalisco. The cemetery is a site of legends and night tours. It opened in 1848 and was formally closed for burials in 1896. It remains open to the public for both daytime and evening tours.

== History ==
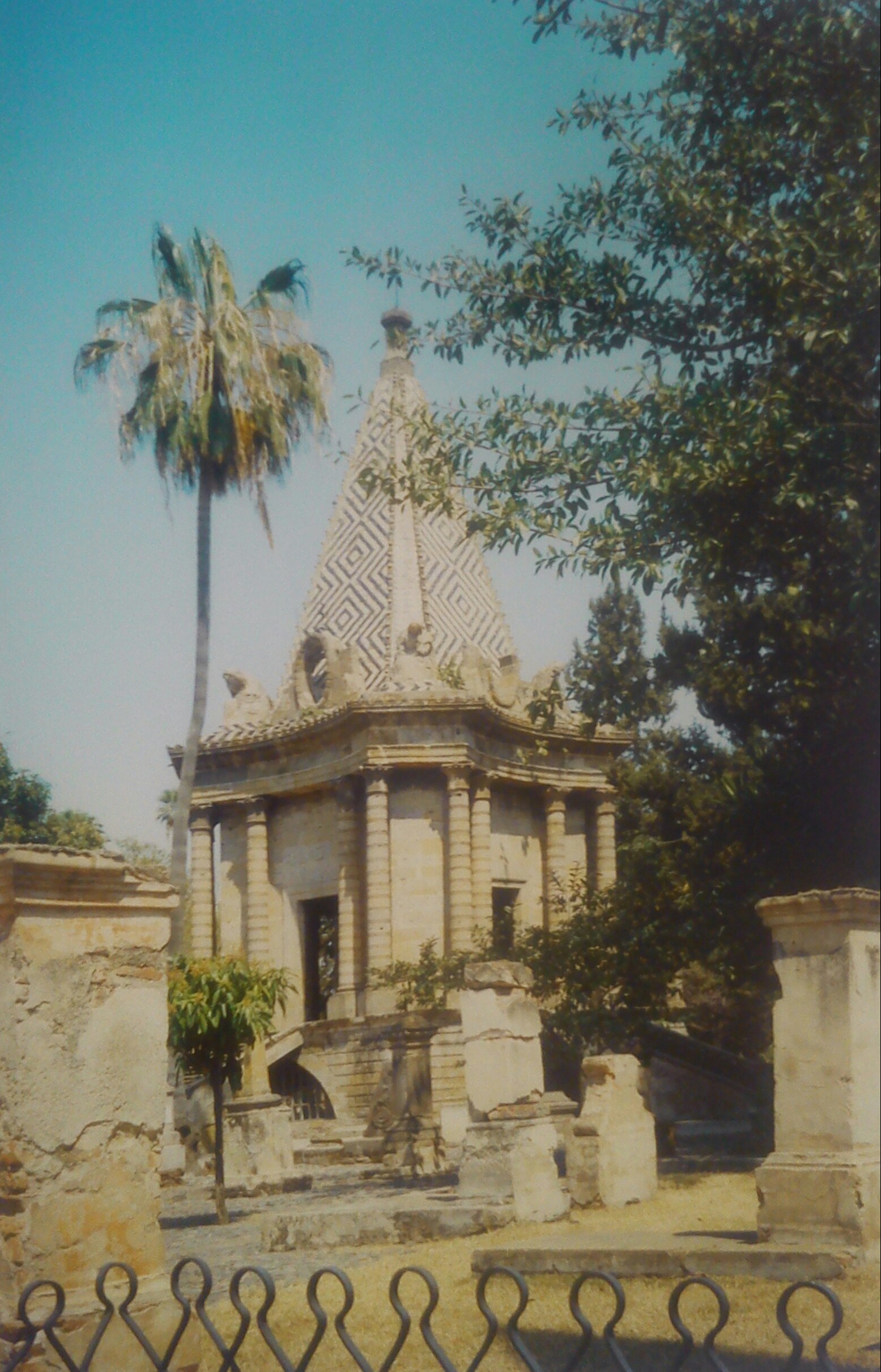
Egyptian Chapel in the Belén Cemetery of Guadalajara

Until the construction of the Rotonda de los Jaliscienses Ilustres the cemetery housed the memorial for major historic figures from Jalisco. Its original name was Santa Paula Cemetery and it was a project by Fray Antonio Alcalde. Guadalajara suffered of a large number of epidemics and the conventional hospitals were unable to support the demand for medical attention.

In 1737, the Spanish crown requested to the Oidor Marqués de Altamira Don Juan Rodríguez de Albuerne, information about the number of patients at the Betlemitas Hospital. On March 8, 1751, the crown granted permission to relocate the hospital. King Ferdinand VI requested the blueprints and granted funds to build a new hospital.

Guadalajara faced a large famine in 1786 (Año del hambre). The old hospital was not large enough to treat the number of patients.

On May 3, 1793 the Hospital of Belén was inaugurated.

After the Independence War, Guadalajara faced a large number of famines and epidemic diseases like in 1833. Cholera killed a large percentage of the population.

Guadalajara required a new cemetery outside the populated areas. The land used for the hospital's orchards were given to build the cemetery, which is why it is commonly known as the "Panteon de Belen".

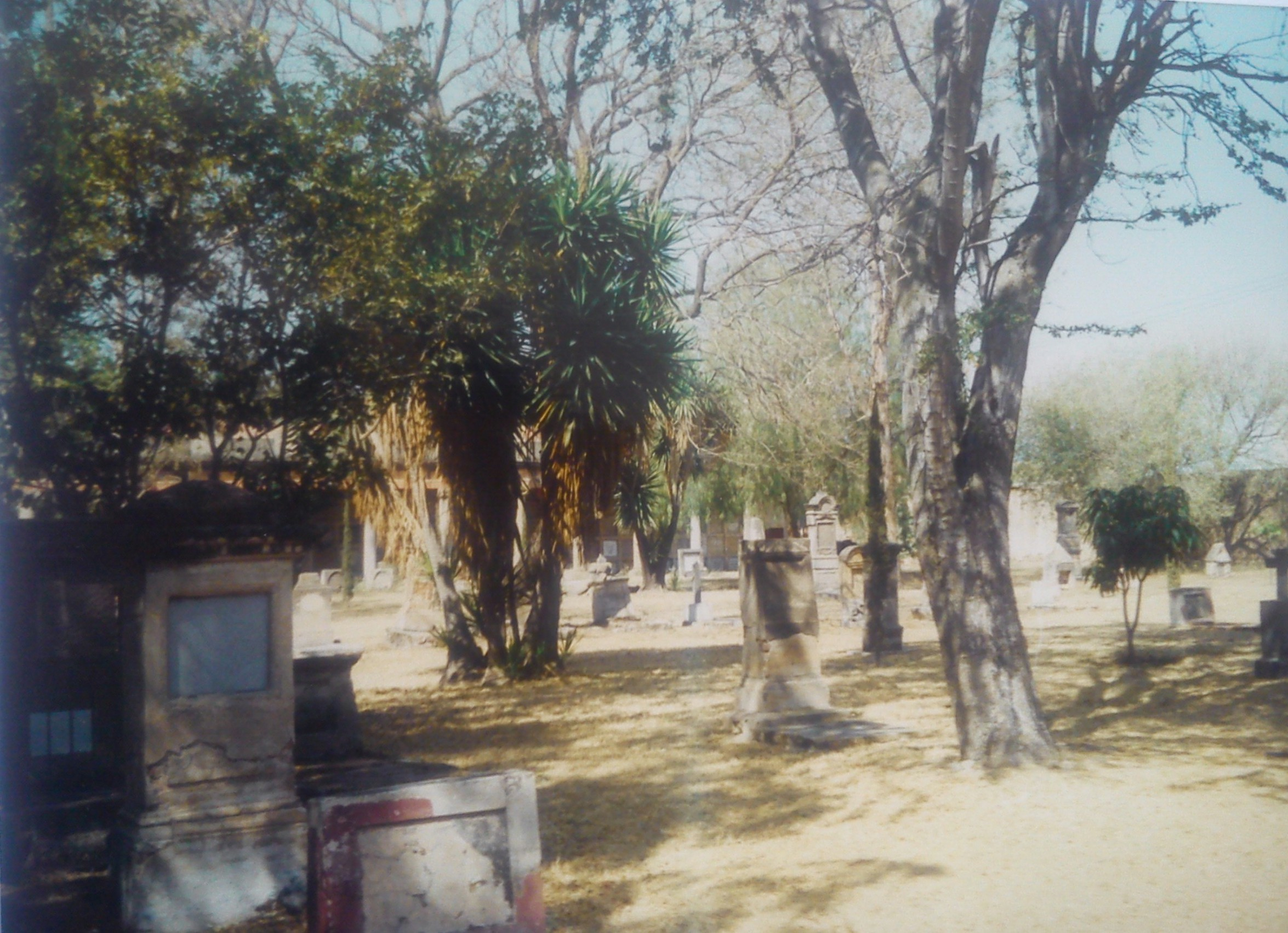
Guadalajara, Panteón de Belén, North Area

The cemetery was constructed by the architect Manuel Gómez Ibarra in 1848, on solicitation from Bishop Diego de Arana y Carpinteiro.

The Panteon de Belen was divided in 2 areas. The common area and the section reserved to the wealthy.

Santa Paula Cemetery received this name because the chapel in the middle of the high-class part of the cemetery was dedicated to her. Under the chapel there's a mausoleum where the remains of the most important figures in the city's history were kept until 1957, when all the remains interred there were transferred to a new area known as the Rotonda de los Jaliscienses Ilustres.

The common area has disappeared and was turned into the Tower of Medical Specialities for the Hospital (Now Called The "Old" Civilian Hospital and owned by the University of Guadalajara); but the wealthy part was re-opened and many legends were created to draw attention to it as some sort of "museum of the macabre".

== Legends ==
Legends of: The Vampire, The Pirate, The Lovers, The Monk, The Child afraid of the Dark, The Story of José Cuervo, The Nun and many more, have surfaced and are part of the local folklore.

Many ghost sightings have been recorded but some think is just some form of mass-hysteria, still the Mexican cultural attraction to the dead draws dozens of people to the daytime and nighttime tours, especially on November 2.

Fen-om, a non-profit organization dedicated to sharing facts of Mexican culture, focuses on the Panteón de Belén as part of quarterly tours of the city of Guadalajara. Many of the traditional tales of the graveyard can be found as part of the itinerary of its 7-day-a-week tours.
