= COVID-19 vaccination in Mexico =

Plan to immunize against COVID-19

- Date: December 24, 2020 – present
- Location: Mexico
- Cause: COVID-19 pandemic in Mexico

COVID-19 vaccination in Mexico is an ongoing immunization campaign against severe acute respiratory syndrome coronavirus 2 (SARS-CoV-2), the virus that causes coronavirus disease 2019 (COVID-19), in response to the ongoing pandemic in the country.

== Background ==
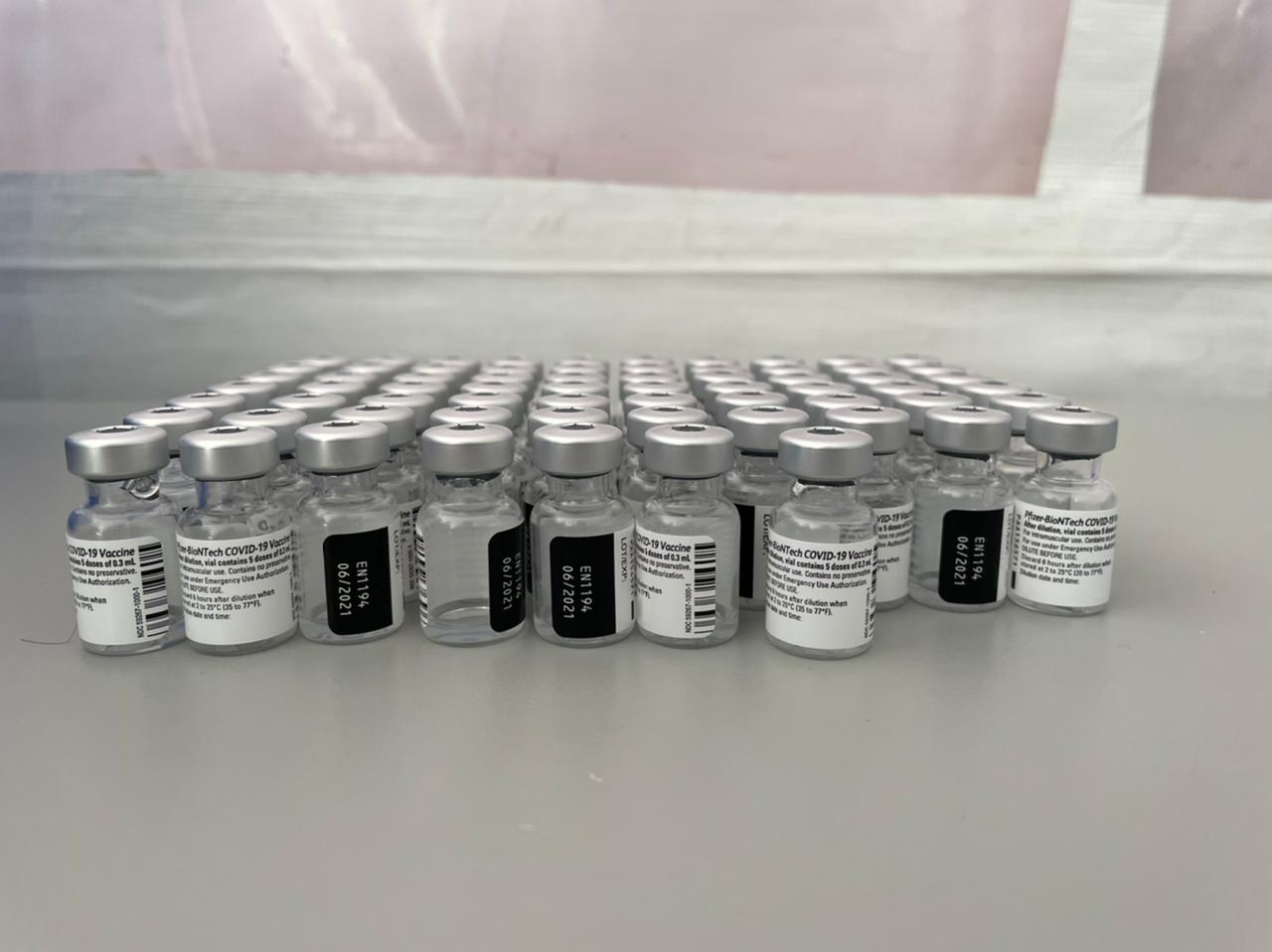
COVID-19 vaccine vials being made ready for delivery at a vaccination centre in Mexico

By September 25, 2021, Mexico had administered a total of 97,523,789 doses (74.87 vaccine doses per 100 people), with 54,275,054 residents having received at least one dose and 43,248,659 residents fully vaccinated. Mexico has purchased 310.8 million vaccines doses which covers 141.2% of its population.

Wealthy Mexicans were reported to travel to the neighbouring United States for receiving their vaccinations. In March, the White House announced that four million of doses of COVID-19 vaccines manufactured in the United States will be sent to Mexico.

In a survey conducted in March 2021, 52% of the Mexicans said that they were willing to get vaccinated against COVID-19, 20% said they were not sure and 28% said they would not get vaccinated.

On 20 April 2021, President López Obrador televised himself receiving the AstraZeneca vaccine.

=== National vaccination plan ===
The National vaccination plan against COVID-19 has been planned as below in Mexico:

- December 2020 - February 2021 : Health workers dealing with COVID-19
- February - April 2021 : Other health workers and people 60+ years of age
- April - May 2021 : People 50-59 years old
- May - June 2021 : People 40-49 years old
- June 2021 - March 2022 : People 18-39 years old
- November 2021 - April 2022 : People 15-17 years old
- December 2021 - May 2022 : People 12-14 years old
- June 2022 - October 2022 : People 5-11 years old and vaccine stragglers (children under 5 are exempted from vaccination)

Some Mexican states allowed grocery store workers, first responders, and teachers to get vaccinated around the Spring of 2021.

=== Vaccines on order ===
NOT UPDATED SINCE APRIL 2021 - Mexico has contracted 79.4 million doses of the AstraZeneca/Oxford vaccine, 35 million doses of the CureVac vaccine, 22 million doses of the Johnson & Johnson vaccine, 39 million doses of the Moderna vaccine, 10 million doses of the Novavax vaccine, 34.4 million doses of the BioNTech/Pfizer vaccine, 24 million doses of the Sputnik V vaccine, 35 million doses of Convidecia, 12 million doses of the Sinopharm BIBP vaccine and 20 million doses of CoronaVac. 3,305,000 doses of the AstraZeneca/Oxford vaccine have been delivered through the COVAX mechanism, a global initiative that aims at equitable distribution for Covid-19 vaccines. Moreover, the United States have sent 2.5 million doses of the AstraZeneca/Oxford vaccine to Mexico.

The following vaccines are authorized by the Mexican government for use against COVID-19 (approval date in parentheses):

Vaccine	Approval	Deployment
Pfizer–BioNTech	December 11, 2020	December 24, 2020
Oxford–AstraZeneca	January 4, 2021	Yes
Convidecia	February 8, 2021	Yes
Sputnik V	February 9, 2021	Yes
CoronaVac	February 9, 2021	Yes
Covaxin	April 6, 2021	Not yet
Janssen	May 27, 2021	June 17, 2021
Moderna	August 17, 2021	Yes
Sinopharm BIBP	August 27, 2021	Yes
Abdala	December 28, 2021	Not yet

=== Vaccines in trial stage ===
Vaccine	Type (technology)	Phase I	Phase II	Phase III
Novavax	Subunit	Completed	Completed	Completed
GRAd-COV2	Viral vector	Completed	Completed	In progress
Patria	Viral vector	Completed	Completed	In progress
Quivax 17.4		In progress	Not yet	Not yet

== Manufacture and distribution of vaccines in Mexico ==
The Secretary of Foreign Affairs, Marcelo Ebrard, released the details of the agreement between the government of Mexico, Argentina, the pharmaceutical company AstraZeneca and the Carlos Slim Foundation to produce and distribute the vaccine developed by the University of Oxford.

The strategy to distribute the vaccine in Latin America, the product manufactured in the Argentine mAbxience laboratory, will be transferred to the Mexican facilities of the Liomont laboratory, which will be in charge of completing the stabilization, manufacturing and packaging process of the vaccine. The COVID-19 vaccine from the pharmaceutical company CanSino Biologics will be packaged in Querétaro, after the company requested from COFEPRIS, authorization for its emergency use of its vaccine.

== See also ==
- Vaccination in Mexico
- COVID-19 pandemic in Mexico
- Deployment of COVID-19 vaccines
