= COVID-19 pandemic in Mexico =

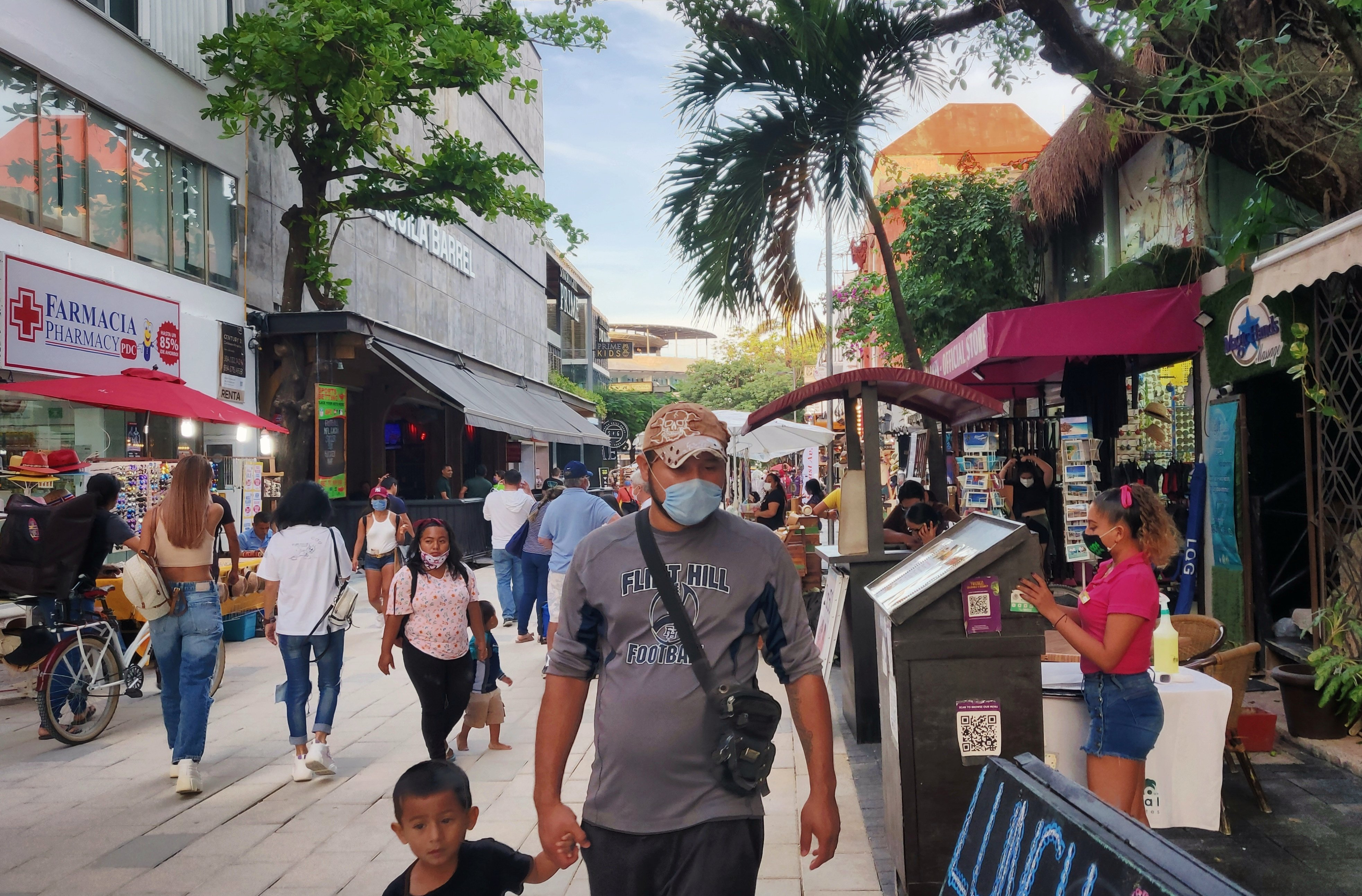
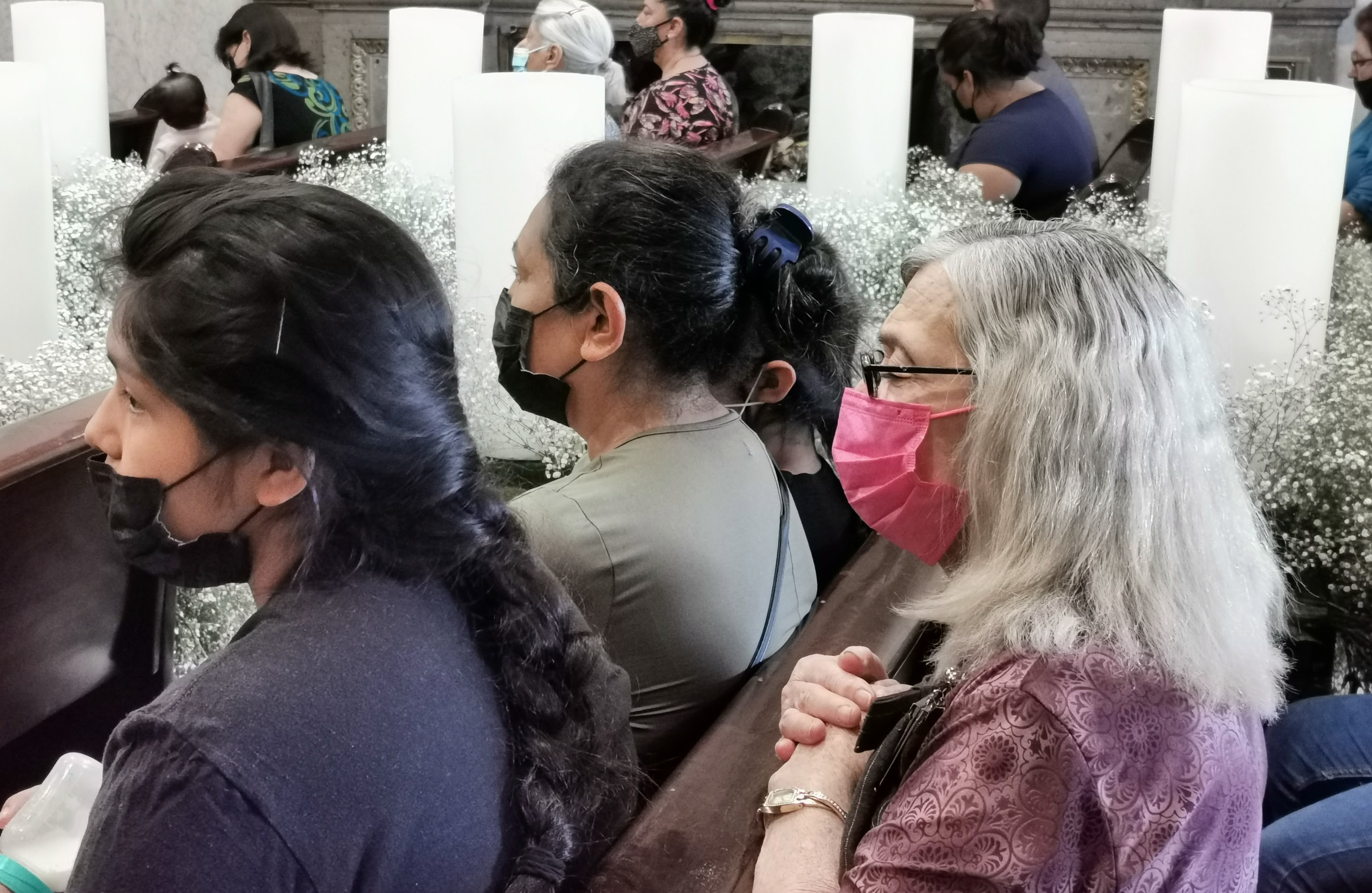
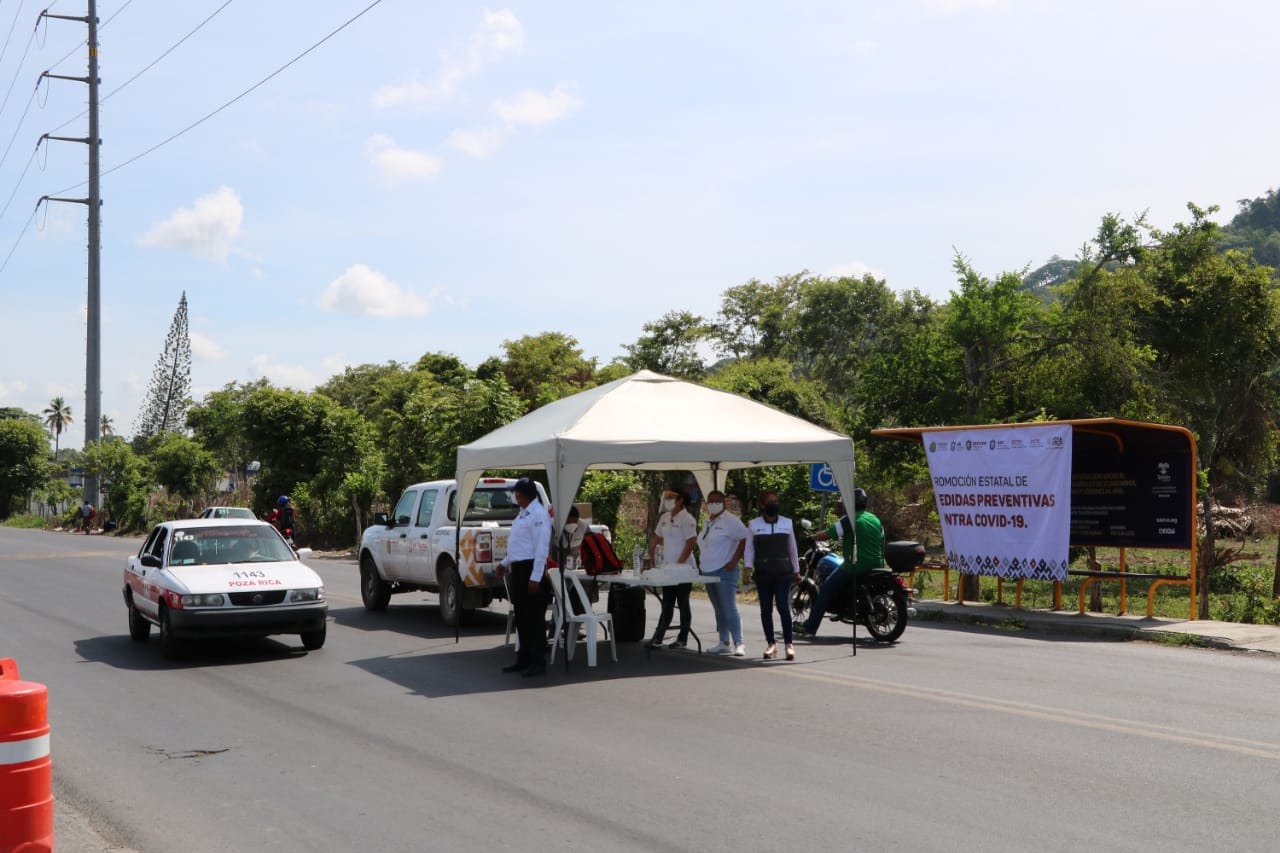
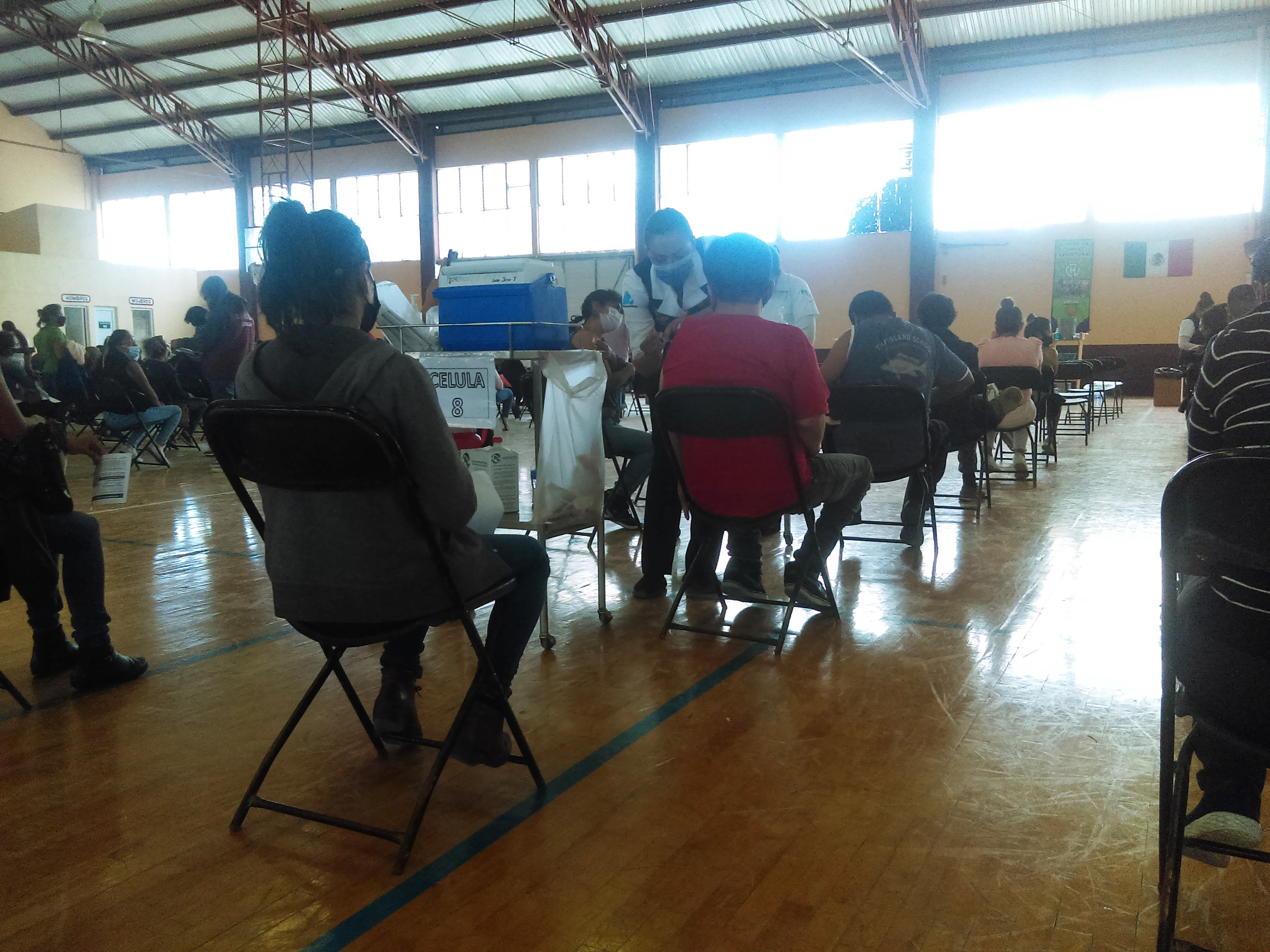
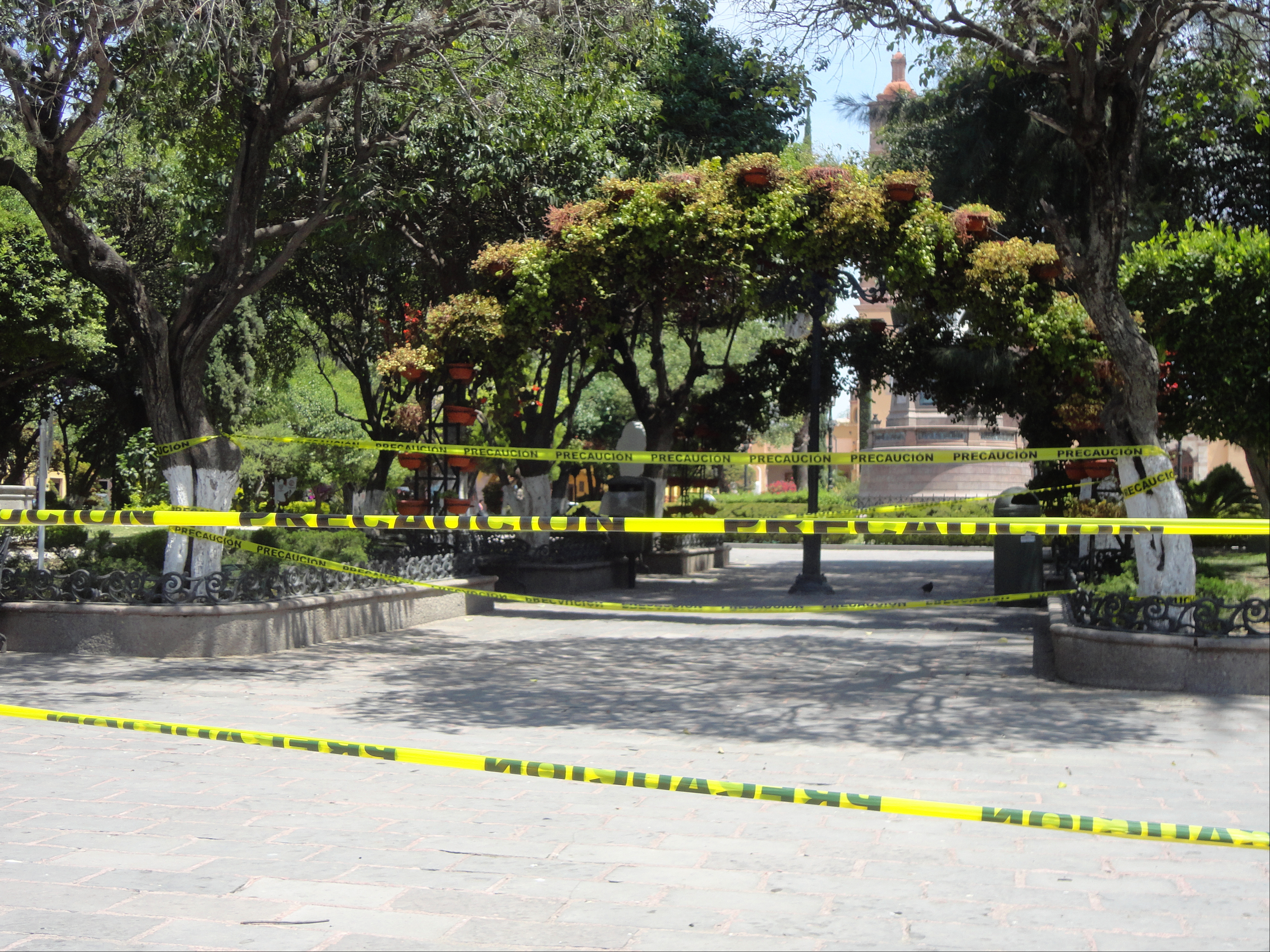
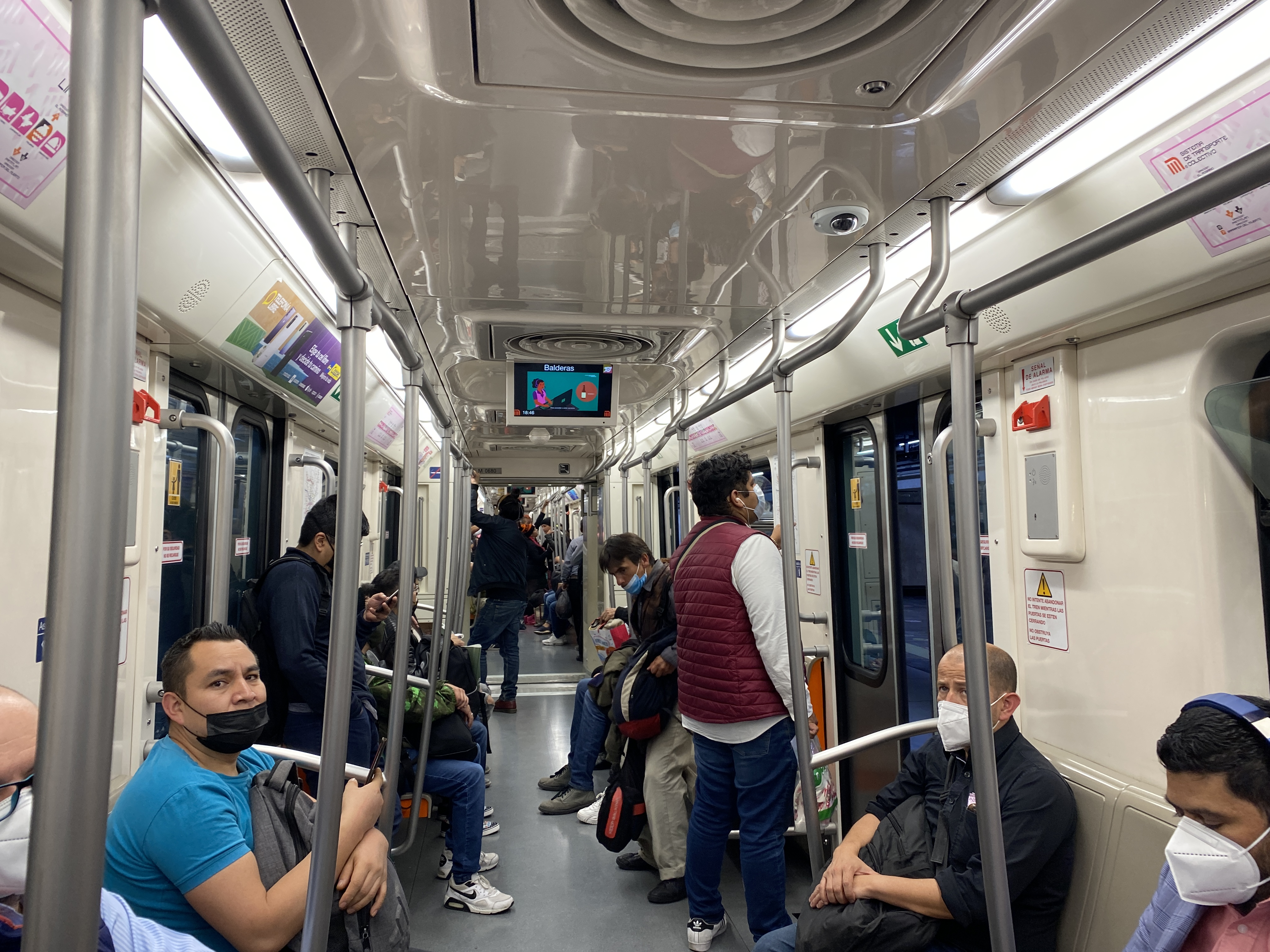
- (from the top, left to right) New normality in Playa del Carmen People with face masks praying in the Basilica of Zapopan Panitary filter at the entrance to Poza Rica Park in Dolores Hidalgo, Guanajuato closed during the contingency People with face masks in the Mexico City Metro
- Disease: COVID-19
- Pathogen: SARS-CoV-2
- Location: Mexico
- First outbreak: Wuhan, Hubei, China
- Index case: Mexico City and Los Mochis
- Arrival date: February 28, 2020 (6 years, 8 months, 1 week and 2 days)
- Confirmed cases: 7,632,767
- Recovered: 7,374,572
- Deaths: 335,205
- Fatality rate: 4.39%
- Vaccinations: 97,179,496 (total vaccinated); 81,849,960 (fully vaccinated); 223,158,990 (doses administered)

Government website
- COVID-19 Versión para móviles

The COVID-19 pandemic in Mexico is part of the ongoing worldwide pandemic of coronavirus disease 2019 (COVID-19) caused by severe acute respiratory syndrome coronavirus 2 (SARS-CoV-2).

The virus was confirmed to have reached Mexico in February 2020. However, the National Council of Science and Technology (CONACYT) reported two cases of COVID-19 in mid-January 2020 in the states of Nayarit and Tabasco, with one case per state.

The Secretariat of Health, through the "Programa Centinela" (Spanish for "Sentinel Program"), estimated in mid-July 2020 that there were more than 2,875,734 cases in Mexico because they were considering the total number of cases confirmed as just a statistical sample.

== Background ==
On January 12, 2020, the World Health Organization (WHO) confirmed that a novel coronavirus was the cause of a respiratory illness in a cluster of people in Wuhan, Hubei, China, which was reported to the World Health Organization (WHO) on December 31, 2019.

The case fatality ratio for COVID-19 has been much lower than SARS of 2003, but the transmission has been significantly greater, with a significant total death toll.

== Timeline ==
Cases

Deaths

=== January 2020 ===
On January 22, 2020, the Secretariat of Health issued a statement saying that the novel coronavirus COVID-19 did not present a danger to Mexico. 441 cases had been confirmed in China, Thailand, South Korea, and the United States, and a travel advisory was issued on January 9.

On January 30, 2020, before the declaration of a pandemic by the World Health Organization the Government of Mexico designed a Preparation and Response Plan that was made by the National Committee for Health Safety, a working group led by Secretariat of Health composed by different health entities aiming to act upon the imminent arrival of the pandemic. This group carried out a series of alert measures, rehabilitation and updating of epidemiological regulations based on the International Health Regulations, being the first Latam country that deployed a mathematical model of infectious disease.

=== February–March 2020 ===
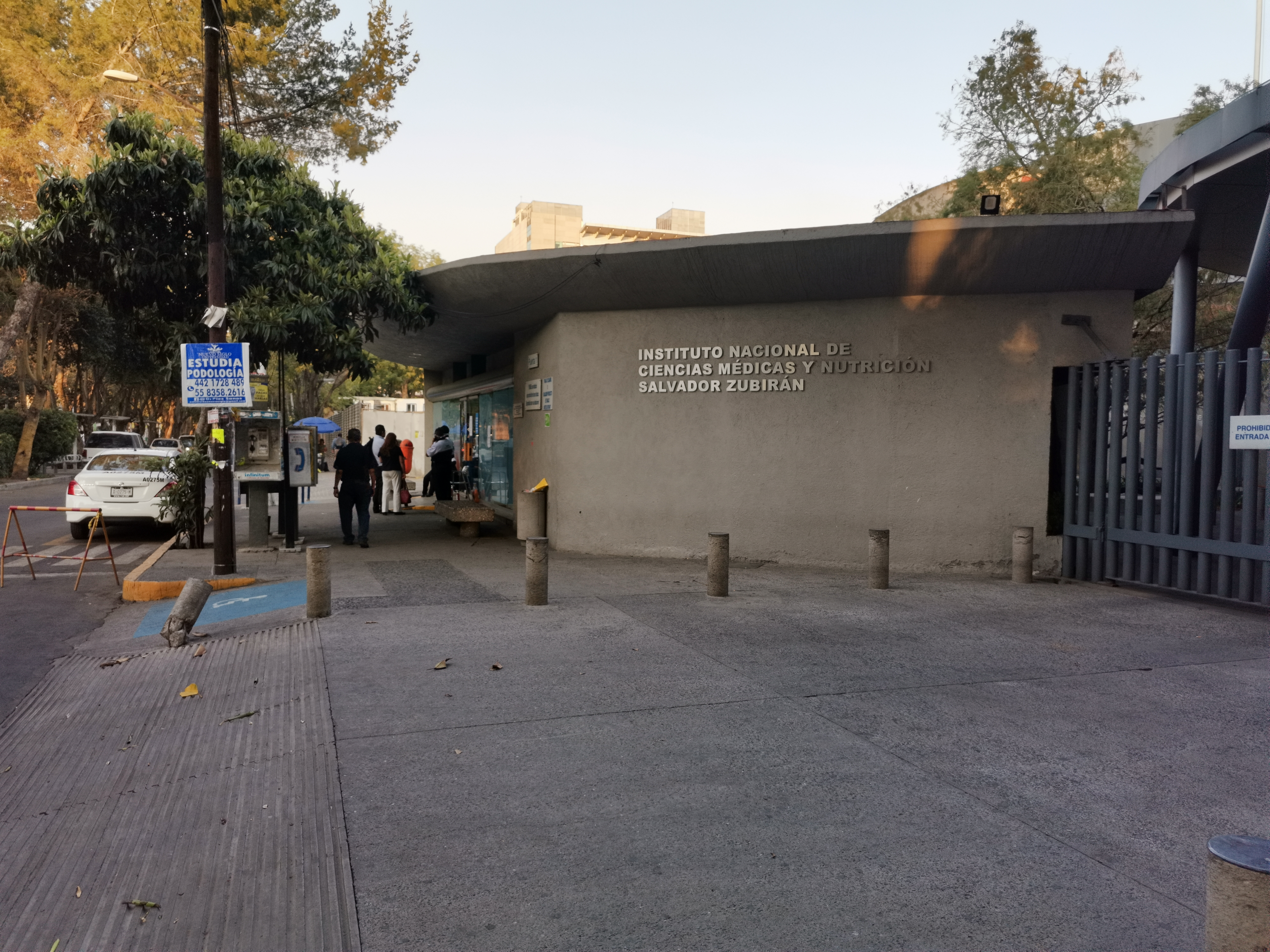
People entering a special respiratory illness symptom assessment area at the Instituto Nacional de Ciencias Médicas y Nutrición Salvador Zubirán, Mexico City. The hospital was converted into a special care area for COVID patients

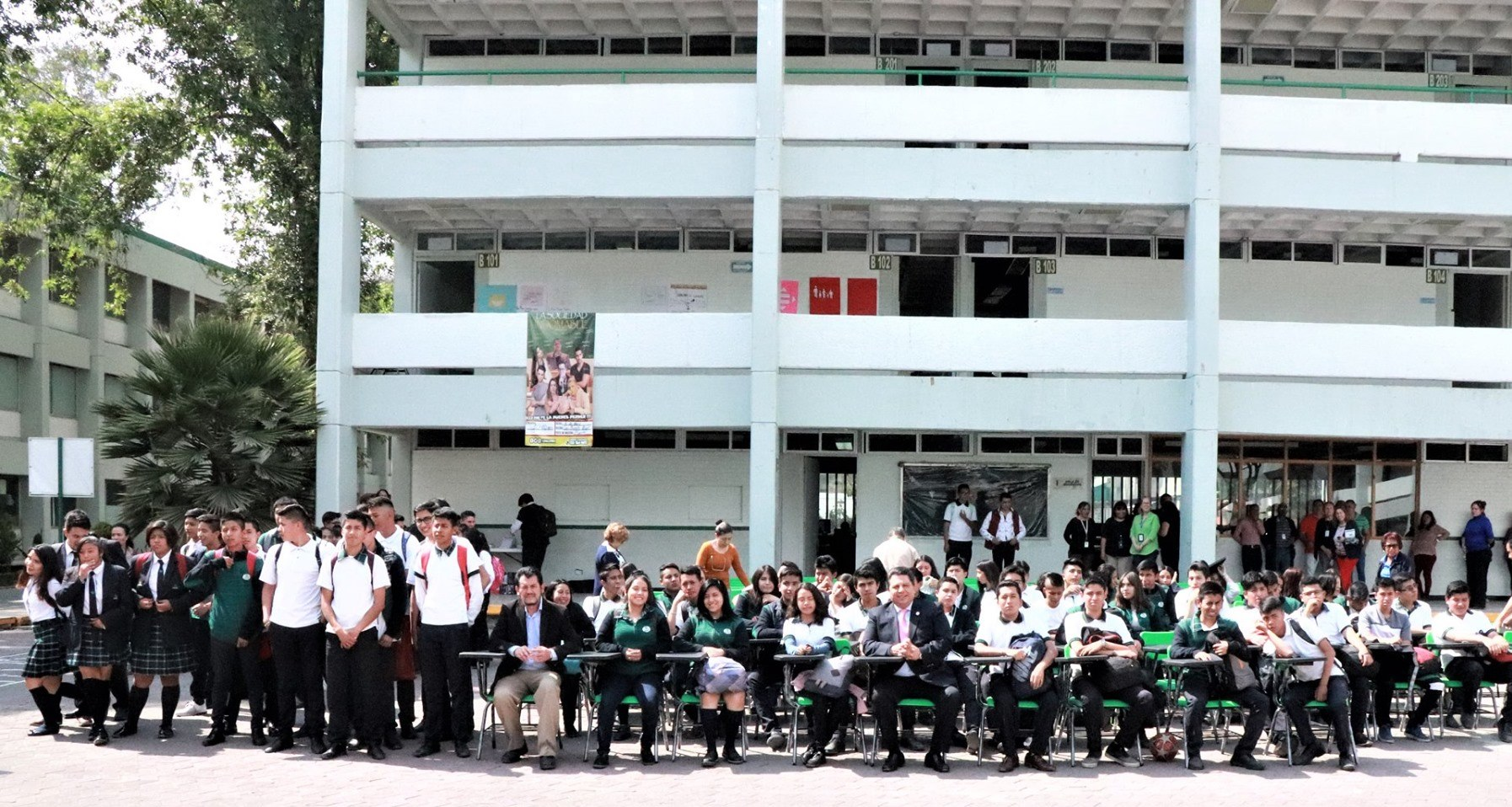
High school students from the Conalep Ing. Bernardo Quintana Arrioja campus in the State of Mexico before the quarantine and suspension of face-to-face school works, photo taken in March 2020

On February 28, Mexico confirmed its first three cases. A 35-year-old man and a 59-year-old man in Mexico City and a 41-year-old man in the northern state of Sinaloa tested positive and were held in isolation at a hospital and a hotel, respectively. They had travelled to Bergamo, Italy, for a week in mid-February. On February 29, a fourth case was detected and confirmed in the city of Torreón, in the state of Coahuila, from a 20-year-old woman who traveled to Italy.

On March 1, a fifth case was announced in Chiapas in a student who had just returned from Italy. On March 6, a sixth case was confirmed in the State of Mexico in a 71-year-old man who had returned from Italy on February 21.

On March 7, a seventh case was also confirmed in Mexico City in a 46-year-old male who had previously had contact with another confirmed case in the United States.

On March 10, an eighth case was reported in Puebla, a 47-year-old German man who had returned from a business trip to Italy. On the same date, 40 members of a dance company in Puebla, returning from a tour in Italy, were quarantined. The Mexican Stock Exchange fell to a record low on March 10 due to fears of the coronavirus and because of falling oil prices. The Bank of Mexico (Banxico) stepped in to prop up the value of the peso, which fell 14% to 22.929 per US dollar.

On March 11, a ninth case was confirmed in the city of Monterrey, Nuevo León. A 57-year-old man, who had recently come back from a trip all across Europe, was placed under quarantine. The man, who has remained anonymous, came back from his trip a week before and had contact with eight other people who have also been placed under quarantine in their houses. The man has been confirmed to reside in the city of San Pedro Garza García.

On March 12, Mexico announced it had a total of 15 confirmed cases, with new cases in Puebla and Durango. A day later, senator Samuel García Sepúlveda accused the federal government of hiding the true number of confirmed cases.

On March 14, Fernando Petersen, the secretary of health of the state of Jalisco, confirmed the first two cases of COVID-19 were detected in Hospital Civil de Guadalajara. Two new cases were confirmed in Nuevo León, and the Secretariat of Public Education (SEP) announced that all sporting and civic events in schools would be canceled. The same day, the Secretariat of Education announced that Easter break, originally planned from April 6 to 17, would be extended from March 20 to April 20 as a preventive measure.

On March 17, 11 new cases were confirmed, raising the national total to 93, with Campeche being the only state with no confirmed cases. Mexico's limited response, including allowing a large concert and the women's soccer championship, as well as a lack of testing, have been criticized. Critics note that president López Obrador does not practice social distancing but continues to greet large crowds, and the borders have not been closed. Of particular concern is the health of thousands of migrants in temporary camps along the border with the United States. The former national commissioner for influenza in Mexico during the 2009 flu pandemic, Alejandro Macías, said the problem is compounded by the fact that Mexico lacks sufficient intensive care unit beds, medical care workers and ventilators.

On March 18, 25 more cases were confirmed raising the total to 118 cases and 314 suspected cases. Authorities in Jalisco are concerned about a group of 400 people who recently returned from Vail, Colorado; 40 people have symptoms of COVID-19.

On March 22, bars, nightclubs, movie theaters, and museums were closed in Mexico City. Governor Enrique Alfaro Ramírez of Jalisco announced that beginning Thursday, March 26, Jalisco and seven other states in the Bajío and western Mexico will block flights from areas such as California that have a high rate of coronavirus. He also said that they will purchase 25,000 testing kits.

On March 26, Ana Lucía de la Garza Barroso, Director of Epidemiological and Operational Research at the Ministry of Health, reported surprisingly few cases, which raised questions of thoroughness.

On March 30, the total number of cases of COVID-19 surpassed one thousand with 1,094 confirmed cases and 28 reported deaths in the country. In the evening, a national health emergency was declared by Secretary Marcelo Ebrard; all sectors in the country are urged to stop most of their activities.

=== April–May 2020 ===
On April 10, the total confirmed deaths surpassed two hundred with 233 deaths and 3,844 cases confirmed by Mexican authorities. The government of Baja California closed a plant belonging to the multinational giant Smiths Group after the firm refused to sell ventilators to the Mexican government. On the same day, Mexican consulates in the United States announced the deaths of 181 Mexican nationals due to the COVID-19 pandemic.

On April 13, the number of COVID-19 infections in the country passed 5,000; there were 332 deaths. The Mexican Navy announced it would open ten voluntary self-isolation units to shelter 4,000 COVID-19 patients in Mexico City, Guerrero, Jalisco, Michoacan, Sinaloa, Tamaulipas and Veracruz. Sonora became the first state in the country to declare a curfew.

The number of coronavirus cases surges past 10,000 to 10,544 with 970 deaths on April 21. The death toll surpassed the 1,000 figure on April 23. Tijuana expects its hospitals to run out of space over the weekend.

On May 1, Mexico surpassed 20,000 infections of COVID-19. Mexicanos contra la corrupción (Mexicans against corruption) alleged that Léon Manuel Bartlett, son of Manuel Bartlett the head of the Comisión Federal de Electricidad (CFE), fraudulently tried to sell overpriced ventilators to the Mexican Institute of Social Security (IMSS) in Hidalgo. On May 2, Mexico surpassed 2,000 deaths due to the COVID-19 pandemic. At least forty Mexican and Guatemalan farm workers in Canada contracted coronavirus, that according to the United Food and Commercial Workers.

An article published on The New York Times on May 8 assured that both the federal government and the state government of Mexico City ignored the wave of coronavirus deaths in the capital city. The article criticized the way that President Andrés Manuel López Obrador has been handling the pandemic citing the lack of testing done and the fact that the government has been hiding the real number of COVID-19 cases and deaths. It was also mentioned that despite the fact that Undersecretary Hugo López-Gatell has been saying that "We [Mexico] have flattened the curve" and that only 5% of those infected will show symptoms, and only 5% of those patients with symptoms will go to the hospital, experts say that "their model is wrong" and that "there's a very good consensus on that".

More than 100 health workers (doctors, nurses, orderlies, etc.) are among the 3,573 dead from the virus on May 12.

Between May 9 and 15, 13,000 new cases were confirmed. The totals were 42,595 cases, 10,057 active cases, and 4,477 deaths on May 15.

On May 22, the number of new cases and deaths reported in 24-hours reached a record high of 2,973 and 420 respectively.

=== June–July 2020 ===
Video of a nasopharyngeal swab for COVID-19 testing in Mexico

On June 2, the number of new cases of infection increased by 4.2% (3,891) compared to the day before. Women made up 57% of the 97,326 confirmed cases in the country at the time.

51.2% of all infections (94,958 cases) occurred in the so-called "new normal" from May 18 to June 23 as the period after the country's general quarantine was lifted and states began to resume their economic and social activities in stages. Deaths also grew by 56% (12,654 cases) in these 22 days of "new normal."

On July 1, Mexico became the seventh country with the most COVID-19 deaths surpassing Spain. The same day, Mexico reported 231,770 confirmed cases of COVID-19, with this Mexico became the tenth country with the most infected people with the virus in the world. On July 4, Mexico moved to sixth place in the number of deaths by COVID-19, surpassing France.

On July 8, department stores reopened in Mexico City, but customers were limited to only one hour of shopping, they must wear a face mask, and may not use dressing rooms nor try products such as cosmetics or perfumes.

On July 11, Mexico surpassed the United Kingdom and became the eighth country with the greatest number of confirmed cases in the world. The same day, the ashes of 245 Mexicans that died of COVID-19 in the United States arrived in Mexico City and were given to their respective family. On the same day's daily press conference of Undersecretary Hugo López-Gatell, the Undersecretary said that the Secretariat of Health was putting on hold the presentation of next week's "traffic light" due to the inconsistencies found on the data that certain states were reporting. Yucatán and Quintana Roo, states that were pointed out by López-Gatell for their inconsistencies and delayed reporting, said that they were fully complying with what they were asked to report. On July 12, Mexico became the country with the fourth greatest number of deaths in the world with 35,006, surpassing Italy.

On July 13, 304,435 cases and 35,491 deaths were reported. Undersecretary Hugo López-Gatell, said that there has been a decrease in new cases in the Valley of Mexico as Guanajuato moves into second place with 2,530 active cases. Nuevo León reports an occupancy rate of 82% in hospitals.

On July 22, the Assistant Director of the Pan American Health Organization, Jarbas Barbosa, announced that Mexico was the 38th country to send a letter of intent to buy a COVID-19 vaccine when one is available. Secretary Marcelo Ebrard said there was evidence that a vaccine might be available during 2020, and that the goal is an even distribution of 2 billion doses among the other 77 countries. On July 23, President López Obrador confirmed that he had relatives infected by COVID-19 and even that some have died because of the virus.

On July 30, Undersecretary Hugo López-Gatell threatened governors who deliberately change the traffic light status of their respective states with criminal sanctions. On that matter, Maricela Lecuona González, lawyer of the Secretariat of Health, said that:

When the government of a federal entity ceases to comply with the result of the weekly assessment and omits to call for measures relating to the respective level of risk by the federal health authority, and accordingly instructs its population to take measures related to a lower risk level, after the investigation of the competent authority that so resolves, it is clear that the public servants who take such determination may be civil, administrative and/or criminally liable for that decision.

Several governors rejected the proposal. The French pharmaceutical company Sanofi-Pasteur announced it will soon begin testing a COVID-19 vaccine in Mexico.

On July 31, Mexico moved into third place in the number of fatalities, behind the United States and Brazil, with 46,688 deaths. Mexico occupied sixth place globally in the total number of confirmed cases, with 424,637.

=== August–December 2020 ===
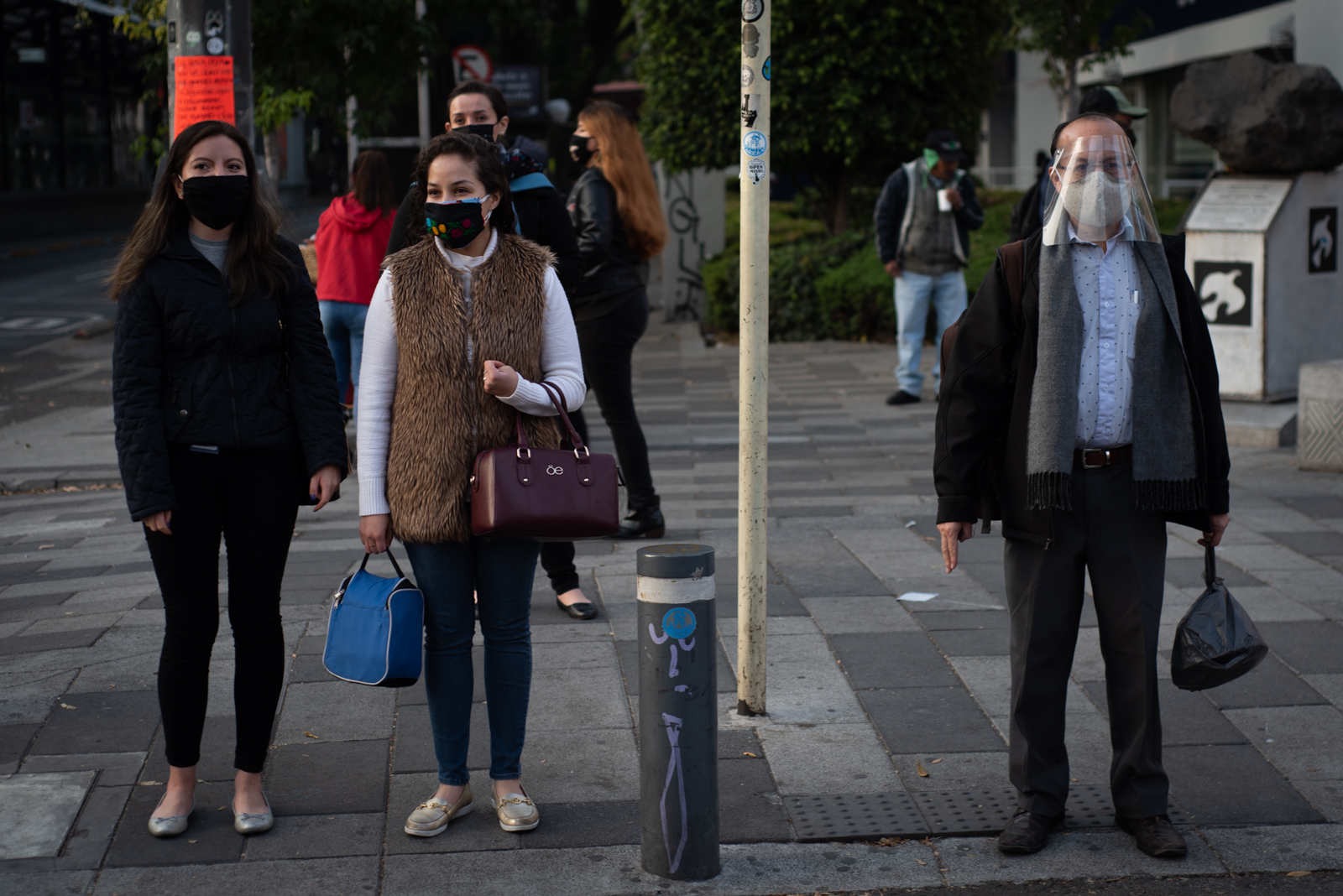
Office workers wearing masks in Mexico City streets

On August 3, Patricia Ruiz Anchondo, the Mexico City Social Prosecutor, announced that over 3,000 complaints had been filed regarding parties in apartment buildings that violated the official COVID-19 sanitary guidelines. Most of them were in the boroughs of Benito Juárez, Cuauhtémoc, and Iztapalapa.

On August 4, the Secretariat of Health reported that 4,732 people who spoke an indigenous language have been infected with COVID-19 and, of those infected, 798 have died.

Mexico passed the mark of 50,000 deaths on August 6. The United States Department of State classifies travel to Mexico as "high risk."

On August 13, the Carlos Slim Foundation announced they were going to finance the effort of Mexico, Argentina, the University of Oxford and AstraZeneca to produce and distribute the production and distribution of the vaccine against COVID-19 that's being developed by the last two. The distribution of the vaccine will begin during the first semester of 2021 and it will be available through Latin America, with the exception of Brazil. The number of confirmed cases passed 500,000.

On August 16, José Luis Alomía, director of Epidemiology of the Secretariat of Health, announced that for the third week in a row, the total number of newly confirmed cases in a week saw a decline and, for the first time, the number of recovered cases in a week surpassed the number of newly confirmed cases.

On August 18, a group of German virologists arrived to share their knowledge and expertise with the Mexican government.

On August 25, Secretary of Foreign Affairs Marcelo Ebrard announced that Mexico would be participating in clinical trials for the development of a COVID-19 vaccine by the Italian Istituto Nazionale di Malattie Infettive "Lazzaro Spallanzani" (National Institute for Infectious Diseases "Lazzaro Spallanzani"). Additionally, he informed that 2,000 Mexicans will be participating in stage 3 trials of the Gam-COVID-Vac vaccine (trade name Sputnik V) that was developed by Russia.

Over 25 million cases are reported in 188 countries and territories on August 30. Six million of those cases are in the United States, and 595,841 are in Mexico.

On September 3, President AMLO said that the government had a savings exchange of up to MXN $100 billion for vaccines, and he asked the different political parties to donate half of their budgets to help pay for the pandemic. Deputy Mario Delgado (National Regeneration Movement) said that it is an "ethical imperative", he argued that families in Mexico shouldn't be allowed to be in a difficult situation while political parties keep getting more resources. INEGI reported that the July unemployment rate had fallen to 5.4%, for a total workforce of 52.6 million (72.2% men and 39.2% women). 10.8 million workers earn between two and five times the minimum wage, 27.3 million people are engaged in the "informal sector". The greatest increases in employment have been in the commercial sector, while construction, restaurants, transportation, and lodging have fallen behind.

The Catholic Church in Mexico reported on September 4 a total of 77 priests, seven permanent deacons, and four other religious people have died of COVID-19.

On September 6, Rappi said home blood tests for COVID-19 will be available with a fourteen-hour wait for an appointment and a ten-minite wait for results. A large party in which few guests wore facemasks or practiced social distancing, was held in defiance of health regulations at Viñedos Hacienda De Letras in Aguascalientes. The state had 489 deaths and 7,601 confirmed cases as of September 6.

On September 7, researchers at the UNAM reported the development of a saliva-based test that is quicker, easier, and more economical than existing tests. Results of the study have been published in the Journal of Clinical Microbiology.

The Consejo Nacional para Prevenir la Discriminación (National Council to Prevent Discrimination, Conapred) reports that it has had 426 COVID-19-related complaints in five months, mostly the obligation to work while at personal risk. On September 8, Foreign Minister Marcelo Ebrard (SRE) reported that 17,393 Mexicans who were stranded in different countries, mostly in Latin American and Europe, have been repatriated. The SRE also announced that 2,325 Mexicans have died of the virus in the United States, six in Canada, three in Spain, and one each in Colombia, France, and Guatemala.

On September 9, Coahuila passed 1,500 deaths; 13,367 people have been released from hospitals. Arturo Herrera Gutiérrez (SHCP) reports that 440,000 industrial jobs have returned after closings earlier this year. Reuters reports that Landsteiner Scientific pharmacies will receive 32 million doses of the Russian-made vaccine in November. Switzerland removes Mexico from the list of countries with a high rate of infection. Six former Health Secretaries release a report critical of the government's response to the virus, saying that increased testing and mapping of cases could lead to containing infections in six to eight weeks. Pemex became the company with the most COVID-19 deaths in the world, with 313. The state-owned oil company also reported 8,166 cases, of which 78.3% have recuperated. The numbers do not include retired workers or families of workers, whose 583 cases have resulted in 413 deaths.

On September 10, Hugo López-Gatell thanked the former health secretaries for their report on the government's response to the pandemic, but questioned the timing and possible political motives, noting that the report had been produced with input from the Citizens' Movement. He also noted the irony of Dr. José Narro's criticism of a lack of infrastructure.

Mexico passed the mark of 70,000 deaths on September 11.

On September 12, each of the 951 public hospitals that receives COVID-19 patients was given 1,500 cachitos (one-twentieth of a lottery ticket) for the September 15 raffle of the presidential airplane. Each cachito has a value of MXN $500; if a hospital wins, the MXN $20 million (US$1 million) is to be applied to hospital infrastructure, equipment, or medical supplies. The Party of the Democratic Revolution called for an investigation.

On September 15, hospitals in Fresnillo, Durango (ISSSTE); Tepic, Nayarit (IMSS); and Charo, Michoacán (IMSS) each won MXN $20 million in the raffle of the presidential plane.

Federal Deputy Miguel Acundo González (Social Encounter Party) died from COVID-19 on September 16. Thirty-one deputies have tested positive for COVID-19, but most have been asystematic or have had mild cases.

The SRE announced on September 17 that the partial closure of the border with the United States would extend until October 21.

British medical journal The Lancet publishes an article that states the high level of COVID-19 deaths among Mexican health workers is related to poor working conditions. Mexico has reported 1,320 deaths in the sector, compared to 1,077 in the United States, 649 in the United Kingdom, and 634 in Brazil.

It was announced on September 24 that the government has spent MXN $59.2 billion on the coronavirus, $35 billion of which was by the federal government and the rest by the states. The greatest expenses were in March as the government bought equipment and supplies and began hiring more personnel.

Joel Molina Ramírez, a senator (MORENA) from Tlaxcala, died on October 24.

On November 13 (Week 44) Mexico reported a total of 991,835 cases and 97,056 total deaths, including 626 deaths in 24-hours, which represents a 2% increase since Week 43 but a 46% decrease since Week 28. 39% of the people tested for COVID-19 result positive. More than 3,000 active cases were reported in CDMX, Nuevo León, State of México, and Guanajuato. Mexico City may have to return to a state of maximum alert (traffic light red).

Arturo Herrera Gutiérrez, Secretary of Finance and Public Credit (SHCP), says that a vaccine is necessary for an economic recovery, and that Mexico will have financial resources to pay for ten million doses per month. Dr. Hugo López-Gatell says the preliminary results from Pfizer and BioNTech are promising, but warns that Mexico does not have the infrastructure to store the vaccine at the needed -70 °C.

Mexico passed 1,000,000 confirmed cases on November 15.

A total of over 100,000 COVID-19 deaths was reported on November 19.

On November 20, a judge in Chihuahua ruled that Elektra department stores and Banco Azteca, both owned by billionaire Ricardo Salinas Pliego, are not essential industries and must comply with the restrictions put in place by the state Department of Health.

A record 10,000 new cases in a single day were recorded on November 24 and 25 after a 5% decrease was reported from Week 45 to Week 46. Mexico City and some states expressed concern about saturation of hospitals. Besides the capital, Guanajuato, Nuevo León, State of México, Querétaro, Coahuila, Durango, Jalisco, and Zacatecas each have more than 1,000 active cases. Chiapas and Campeche continue with green traffic lights.

On December 3, AMLO said that the government of the United States helped him secure an agreement from Pfizer to secure 34.4 million doses of its COVID-19 vaccine, including 250,000 doses in December. The Army and Navy will be responsible for distribution. Authorities in Puerto Marqués, Guerrero, broke up a birthday party of 500 people celebrating XV años; no arrests reported.

The use of QR codes was begun in Mexico City Metro Line 2 to aid in contact tracing on December 9. It will soon extend to other metro and bus lines. There were a reported 4,235 hospital beds occupied, representing 63% of capacity, in the Valley of Mexico. Although authorities have asked people to stay home as much as possible, it is common to see people on the streets and in shopping areas, often ignoring health precautions such as safe distancing and the use of face coverings.

On December 10, for the first time three dogs, two in Mexico City and one in the State of Mexico, were reported with COVID-19.

On December 11, López-Gatell said that the average age of death due to the Coronavirus in Mexico is 55, compared to 75 in Europe. He explained that the difference is primarily due to high rates of obesity and diabetes in Mexico. He also said that all purchases of vaccines will be done by the federal government, although some politicians have suggested governors should buy their own supplies for their states. The government's medical safety commission approved the emergency use of the Pfizer-BioNTech coronavirus vaccine, following approval by Great Britain, Canada, and Bahrain and just before approval by the United States. The first 250,000 doses will go to health workers.

On December 15, López-Gatell said that the government will not order a general lockdown despite recent increases in cases because 60 million people who live in poverty cannot afford it. The country reported 5,930 new infections and 345 deaths, fr a total 1,255,974 cases and 114,298. Mexico City reports 75% saturation of hospital beds and 68%-70% saturation of beds with ventilators. Governor Alejandro Tello of Zacatecas, one of two states (with Baja California) with traffic light red, tests positive for COVID-19.

According to a survey released by the Instituto Nacional de Salud Pública (National Institute of Public Health—INSP) on December 16, 31 million Mexicans, 25% of the population, has been exposed to the virus.

On December 16, thirty-seven hospitals in the Valley of Mexico reported "critical" (90%—100%) occupancy, 25 reported "medium" (50%—89%) occupancy, and 13 "good" (0%—49%) occupancy for COVID-19 patients. Also 150 members of SEDENA and 50 members of SEMAR began training for application of the Pfizer-BioNTech COVID-19 vaccine.

On December 17, Hugo Lopez-Gatell walked back an announcement made last week that Mexico planned to buy 35 million doses of the Chinese-made Convidecia vaccine, suggesting the figure may be closer to 10 million doses. He also said the country is close to signing an agreement to purchases 22 million doses from the Belgian-made Janssen Pharmaceutica vaccine.

Despite government warnings against family reunions, on December 18 the Instituto Nacional de Migración (National Migration Institute—INM) reported that a caravan of 700 vehicles had crossed the border from Laredo, Texas, filled with migrants looking to reunite with their families for holiday gatherings.

The number of passengers at Benito Juárez International Airport in CDMX increased as the Christmas holiday season neared.

On December 20, the Instituto Nacional de Transparencia, Acceso a la Información y Protección de Datos Personales (National Institute for Transparency, Access to Information, and Protection of Personal Information, INAI) order the Secretariat of Health (SSA) to provide complete information about the number of COVID-related deaths from February 19 to August 31. Esta es una información que debe tener la Secretaría de Salud disponible, aun cuando el cálculo sea letal, como alguna vez lo hemos dicho, sea gráficamente desolador, sea evidentemente lamentable y, por supuesto, preocupante, porque es una tragedia, repito, no se debe maquillar, debe exponerse claramente, ("This is information that the Ministry of Health must have available, even when the calculation is lethal, as we have once said, it is graphically devastating, it is obviously regrettable and, of course, worrying, because it is a tragedy, I repeat, You must not put on makeup, it must be clearly exposed,") said INAI commissioner Francisco Javier Acuña Llamas. Patricia Elisa Durán Reveles, municipal president of Naucalpan, State of Mexico, celebrates her wedding in Cuernavaca, Morelos with 100 guests, despite prohibitions of large crowds. Naucalpan is classified in the red zone while Cuernavaca is orange.

The first batch of vaccines arrived on December 23 with distribution to begin on December 24.

Between December 21 and 23, two hundred three vehicles with 609 people were turned around when they tried to enter Queretaro despite prohibitions against unnecessary travel. Authorities revised 3,383 vehicles and 7,767 people.

Morelos returned to Red alert on December 24. The state reported an 80% increase in cases in December. A Costco big-box store in Cuernavaca had been closed less than 24 hours earlier for violating restrictions on capacity.

Six hundred twenty employees of IMSS from 13 states were sent to the CDMX on December 26 to reinforce efforts to combat the virus. They were supported by 500 Cuban health workers.

SSA reported on December 27 that 10% of the country's total deaths can be attributed to COVID-19. The average number of deaths increased annually by 20,000 from 2015 to 2019, but so far in 2020 the increase has been about 200,000. Sixty-two medical residents at Mexico City General Hospital, including 48 who work directly with COVID-19 patients, protested because they did not receive vaccines but personnel who do not work with virus patients did. Governor José Ignacio Peralta Sánchez of Colima announced that he had tested positive for COVID-19.

Despite the Red alert prohibiting large gatherings, in the State of Mexico, police in Ecatapec and Chalco, State of Mexico, were compelled to close a bar and several large parties as well as stores illegally selling alcohol over the weekend of December 25–27.

On December 29, AMLO reported that China would be sending eight million doses of its CanSino BIO vaccine to Mexico between January and March 2021, and the vaccination of Mexico's elderly could begin. The vaccine does not require cold storage and only one dose is required.

On December 30, AMLO promised to investigate, and if appropriate, punish the director of a hospital in the State of Mexico who, along with his wife and daughters, inappropriately received vaccinations reserved for frontline health workers. An unconfirmed report on Milenio Televisión indicated that 29 of the 109 vaccines applied in Coahuila went to health-system bureaucrats instead of frontline workers.

2020 in Mexico ended on December 31 with 1,426,094 confirmed cases (12,159 in the last 24 hours) and 125,807 confirmed deaths (910 in the last 24 hours). The virus strain that began in the U.K. has not been found in Mexico. Dr. Ana Paola de Cosío Farías, assigned to pediatric hospital "Dr. Silvestre Frenk Freund", Centro Médico Nacional Siglo XXI, resigns after complaining that she and her colleagues have been passed over for receiving the vaccine and have been denied the COVID-19 bonus payment.

=== January–March 2021 ===
On January 1, police in Mexico City (SSC) warned of online and social media fraud in the purchase or rent of oxygen tanks. Over the weekend of January 1 to 3, oxygen distribution at the Hospital General de Zona 83 (IMSS), in Morelia, Michoacán, failed. Thirty-six patients died before employees could restore the system.

AMLO reported on January 2 that 64% of the 53,625 doses of vaccines the country has received have been applied. He expects the 750,000 health workers in the country to be vaccinated by the end of the January. A 32-year-old doctor in Nuevo Leon was hospitalized after an alergic reaction to the Pfizer vaccine.

Starting January 4, five entities—CDMX, State of Mexico, Baja California, Guanajuato, and Morelos—will be on Red Alert, 22 are Orange, three Yellow, and two—Campeche and Chiapas—Green. The Federal Commission for Protection Against Health Risks (Cofepris) authorized the emergency use of the Oxford-AstraZeneca vaccine. Mexico signed an agreement to acquire 77.4 million doses between March and August 2021.

45,850 doses of the Pfizer vaccine arrived at the Mexico City International Airport (AICM) on January 5, 2021, destined for frontline health workers. 43,960 people have received the first injection. AMLO outlined plans to recruit 10,000 brigades with 120,000 people to vaccinate 3 million people in isolated communities across the country. The plan calls for administering the vaccine in small communities first and major cities last.

On January 7 the Catholic Church reported that four bishops and 135 priests had died in 2020 due to COVID-19. For the second day in a row, a new record, this time 13,734 new cases were reported in one day. There are a total of 1,493,569 confirmed cases, and there is a 42% positivity rate.

On January 8, Mexico City health director Oliva López Arellano clarified that the city has not initiated Code blue for hopelessly ill patients in hospitals in the city. Some patients have arrived at hospitals with very low oxygen levels, code red, and have died. Thirty-five medical students working at the "Dr. José María Rodríguez" general hospital in Ectepac have tested positive. One student died on January 4, and the other students have since been relieved of their duties.

On January 10, Gloria Molina, health secretary for Tamaulipas, announced that a 56-year-old man was found to be infected with the highly-contagious British strain of COVID-19. The man arrived in Mexico on December 29 after traveling to the United Kingdom in September 2020. Jesús Ramírez Cuevas, general coordinator of Social Communication of the Presidency of the Republic, announced that he had tested positive to the coronavirus.

The University of Guadalajara announced that COVID-19 daily deaths in the state tripled in the three weeks from December 19, 2020, to January 10. compared to the previous month, to an average 58 per day. Hospital bed use increased from 40.7% to 53.0%, and intensive care bed occupation increased from 51.0% to 56.2%.

439,725 doses of vaccine arrived on January 12 which were then distributed for health workers at 879 hospitals across the country. Foreign Minister Marcelo Ebrard said on January 13 that Mexico would enforce the United States–Mexico–Canada Agreement (called T-MEX in Mexico) to ensure that all its nationals would be vaccinated. Nebraska Governor Pete Ricketts reportedly threatened that undocked workers in meat–packing plants would not receive the vaccine. The state of Michoacan reported that its public hospitals reached 100% occupancy and private hospitals were 85% full.

Four bottles of the vaccine were stolen from "Carlos Calero Elorduy Hospital" run by SEDENA in Cuernavaca, Morelos, on January 14.

SALUD reported a new one-day record for infections – 21,366 – on January 15. The agency also reported that nationally 59% of general hospital beds are occupied, and six entities report 70% or more occupation. 415,417 doses of vaccine have been applied, included 1,958 people who have had both injections. 667 people have had serious reactions to the vaccine and 21 have reported mild reactions. Dr. Lopez-Gattel said that a lack of ultrafreezers makes it difficult to fully implement the vaccination program for the elderly. Most of the freezers capable of storage at -70 °C are found in the Metropolitan Area of the Valley of Mexico, Morelia, and Juriquilla, Queretaro, and eleven entities have none.

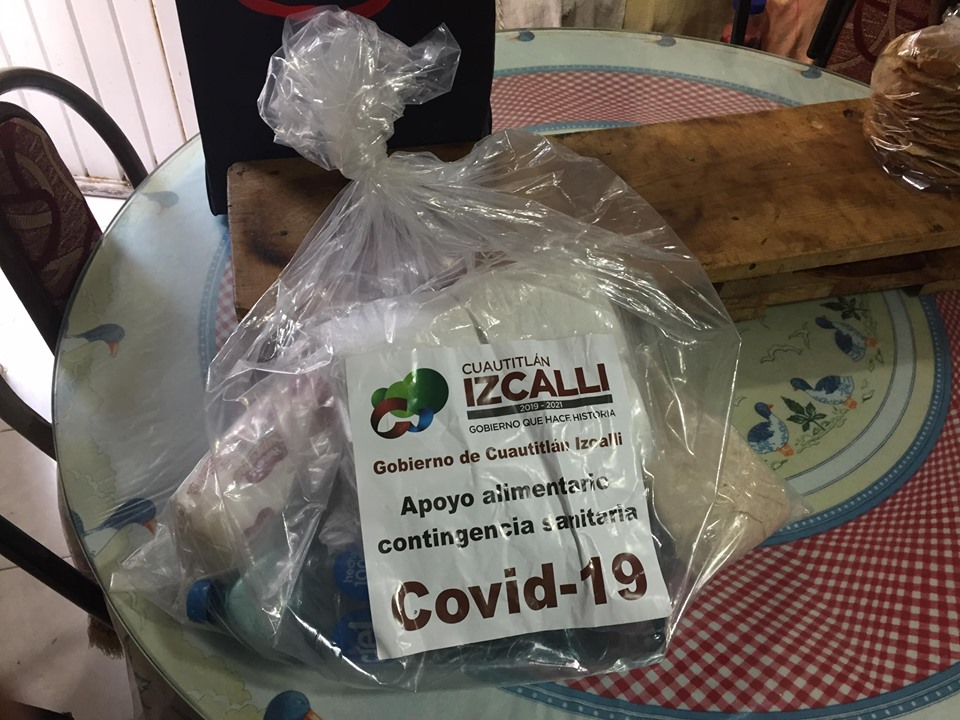
A food relief given in the State of Mexico by the municipality of Cuautitlán Izcalli to help during the pandemic

Hundreds of people, few wearing face masks or keeping a healthy distance, attended the "Gran Bailazo 2021" featuring Norteño and dancing in Vícam, Sonora on January 16–17. No one was charged, and another event is planned for February 13. Sonora is on Orange Alert and Mexico is experiencing the fourth highest levels of COVID-19 infections in the world.

1,584 deaths were confirmed on January 19, the highest single-day record since the pandemic began. Police in Tultepec, State of Mexico, recovered 44 oxygen tanks from a stolen truck. Seven oxygen tanks were stolen Navojoa, Sonora. A shortage of oxygen tanks was exacerbated by hording, and the consumer protection agency promoted its "Return Your Tank, For The Love of Life" campaign.

On January 22, the Consejo Nacional de Población (National Population Board, CONAPO) stated that since March 2020, pregnancies among adolescents had increased 20% (145,719 unwanted pregnancies among women 15–19), and the suicide rate among young people 20–24 had increased to 9.3%. Suicide is the second cause of death among people 15–29. Hugo Lopez-Gatell announced that second doses of the Pfizer vaccine may be delayed as the company plans to send half of a 200,000-dose shipment has been destined by WHO for poor countries. AMLO announced that local governments or private companies that wish to purchase vaccines will be allowed to do so.

On January 24, President López Obrador announced he had a mild case of COVID-19. Interior Secretary Olga Sánchez Cordero will take over for him in his daily news conferences.

With 659 new deaths, Mexico passes 150,000 total deaths on January 25. Carlos Slim, Mexico's richest man whose fortune is estimated at US$60 billion, is infected with COVID-19.

Health authorities reported on January 26 that 202 confirmed cases and 46 probable cases of COVID-19 were responsible for maternal deaths in 2020. Between January 2 and 7, nineteen of 31 (61.2%) maternal deaths were attributed to the coronavirus. Sixty-nine babies born at the Monica Pretelini Saenz maternal hospital in Toluca in 2020 had COVID-19; one died.

On January 27, Secretary of the Interior Olga Sánchez Cordero reported that the pandemic in the Valley of Mexico had stabilized and the number of cases had slightly declined. Mayor Claudia Sheinbaum had said earlier that CDMX would remain on Red Alert through January 31. INEGI reports 44.9% more COVID-19 related deaths (108,658) than those registered by SALUD from January–August 2020, making the virus the second cause of death in the country (behind heart failure but ahead of type 2 diabetes). 58% of the deaths did not occur in hospitals.

The Lowy Institute, an independent think tank in Australia, on January 28 describes Mexico's response to the pandemic the second worst in the world. Days after President López Obrador announced the purchase of the Sputnik V vaccine for delivery in Fecruary, the Russian government announced a 2–3-week delay in delivery. With a 24-hour record of 1,506 deaths, only the United States reported more deaths on the 28th. Mexico is in eighth place in total deaths this week with 18,670.

Thirty entities were on Maximum (red) or High (orange) alert on January 30; only Camperche and Chiapas were Low yellow. 1,841,893 total cases, 96,518 active cases, and 156,579 total deaths were reported. 662,217 people have received the first Pfizer vaccine and 31,397 have received both. 58% of general hospital beds and 52% of beds with ventilators are occupied, although the numbers are 80% each in CDMX.

Vaccine registration for older (60+) adults began on February 2, although many failures were reported in the online-only system.

A study by Instituto Nacional de Ciencias Medicas y Nutricion Salvador Zubiran released in February 2021 showed that from more than 100 people died between February 26 and June 5, 2020, because Intensive care unit (ICU) beds were unavailable at the hospital.

Mexico's mortality rate of 59.2 deaths per million people became the highest in Latin America on February 9, surpassing Panama and Peru; it is the 15th highest in the world.

Vaccination of adults over sixty began on February 15.

On February 16, Mexico passed two million confirmed coronavirus cases and 175,000 deaths, third highest in the world.

The first shipment of 200,000 doses of the Sputnik V vaccine arrived from Moscow on February 22. The vaccine needs to be stored at between 2 °C and 8 °C; Mexico has contracted to buy 24 million doses. Most of this first shipment is destined for elderly people (60+) in Xochimilco, Tláhuac, Iztacalco in Mexico City starting February 24.

The 11th shipment of the Pfizer-BioNTech vaccine (511,000 doses) arrived from Belgium on February 23. The vaccine is destined for health workers; some was sent to Mexico City and some to Monterrey. 4,180 doses of Coronavac vaccine are scheduled to be applied in the State of Mexico on February 23. The 429 deaths reported mark the fifth consecutive week of a decline in infections, hospitalizations, and deaths.

The health department of Nuevo Leon was forced to return 4,680 Sinovac COVID-19 vaccines (33,480 doses) that had spoiled due to poor storage. They should be stored at a temperature of 2 °C to 8 °C, but were stored in coolers at 12 °C or 13 °C.

As of March 16, there have been 2,169,007 confirmed cumulative cases and 195,119 deaths in total. 3,794,719 people have been given the first dose of vaccine.

Prosecutors announced on March 24 that they were unsure whether 5,000 Russian Sputnik V vaccine doses seized aboard a private plane bound for Honduras were authentic. No arrests can be made until their authenticity is established.

The number of confirmed COVID-19 deaths passed 200,000 on March 25, 2021, third highest in the world. With 2,214,542 confirmed cases, Mexico is in thirteenth place in total cases. 6,643,886 doses of vaccine have been applied.

On March 28 a report was issued showing 294,287 COVID-19-related deaths by March 15, 61.4% higher than previously reported. The number of excess deaths is said to be 417,002. The number of daily deaths continues on a downward trend, with 194 deaths reported on March 28. Seven states are in the traffic light orange as Holy Week begins. No state is in red, and Coahuila, Tamaulipas, Veracruz, Jalisco, Nayarit, Chiapas, and Campeche are green.

=== April–June 2021 ===
Medical personnel from private hospitals protested outside the "Escuela Médico Naval" in Mexico City on April 1, demanding to be vaccinated, only to be turned away since there were no vaccines available.

On June 9, Dr. López-Gatell announced he would no longer be giving daily updates on the pandemic, although he would continue to give occasional press conferences.

On June 10, 225 new deaths were reported, bringing the official total to 229,578. 3,672 new cases were reported, bringing the total number of cases to 2,445,538. 1,948,268 people have recovered. The entities with the most active cases are Mexico City (>3,000), Tabasco, Yucatán, Quintana Roo, Baja California Sur, Tamaulipas, and State of México with more than 1,000 each. 25,306,211 people over 40, health workers, Olympic athletes, health workers, and pregnant women have received at least one dosis of the vaccine. 58% have received the complete doses. 28% of the population over 18 have been vaccinated.

Five private schools in Sinaloa had to suspend in-person classes after cases of COVID-19 were discovered on June 11, 2021. Dr. Hugo López-Gatell said the Comisión Federal para la Protección contra Riesgos Sanitarios (Cofepris, Federal Commission for the Protection Against Health Risks) will evaluate the Pfizer proposal to apply its vaccine in children 12 years old or older.

=== January 2022 ===
Popular travel destinations such as Puerto Vallarta mandated presentation of either vaccination proof or a negative PCR test result for individuals over 18 years to public recreational places owing to surge in Covid cases.

== Statistics ==
=== Curves of infection and deaths ===
On April 20, the Secretariat of Health started to report active cases at the daily press conference.

View source data.

=== New cases per day ===
Graphs based on daily reports from the Mexican Secretariat of Health on confirmed cases of COVID-19.

View source data.

=== Deaths per day ===
View source data.

=== Chart of deaths by date of death ===
On June 3 Hugo López-Gatell Ramírez at a daily press conference on COVID-19 explained that daily announced deaths were tested positive for COVID-19 on that day but it does not imply all deaths occurred on this same day. There is a lag, for several causes, between the date of occurrence of the death and the day of positive COVID-19 test result is received.

View source data.

=== Chart of hospitalized cases ===
Number and categorization of hospitalized cases presented by the Secretariat of Health at the daily press conference. After April 20 the Secretariat of Health stopped reporting this type of classification of hospitalized cases. This chart is left here for historical purposes.

View source data.

=== Charts of COVID-19 progression by top states ===
==== Cases ====
View source data.

==== Deaths ====
View source data.

=== Hospital bed occupancy rates by state ===
==== General hospital beds ====
Occupancy rate of general hospital beds as presented by the Secretariat of Health at the daily press conference.

View source data.

==== Beds with ventilators ====
Occupancy rate of beds with ventilators as presented by the Secretariat of Health at the daily press conference.

View source data.

=== SALUD reported Mexico totals ===
As of July 29
State	Cumulative cases	Active cases	Deaths	Recoveries
State	2,810,097	23,715	239,977	1,626,313
Mexico City	775,475	8,916	35,587	460,991
State of Mexico	288,202	2,434	38,184	161,270
Nuevo León	140,502	708	10,055	88,563
Guanajuato	138,115	805	11,161	94,023
Jalisco	103,601	568	13,055	56,954
Puebla	90,413	911	12,465	54,681
Sonora	87,699	459	6,997	51,389
Tabasco	86,310	774	4,426	45,600
Veracruz	78,645	306	10,630	39,190
Querétaro	73,605	942	4,543	48,490
Coahuila	72,509	260	6,533	48,602
Tamaulipas	72,265	331	5,495	39,946
San Luis Potosí	70,170	399	5,504	44,206
Chihuahua	59,978	740	7,648	32,564
Sinaloa	56,294	364	6,956	24,302
Oaxaca	54,444	316	4,136	32,467
Yucatán	53,891	511	4,501	25,313
Michoacán	52,993	405	6,154	32,090
Baja California	52,486	280	8,895	30,884
Guerrero	50,343	439	4,777	26,820
Baja California Sur	48,606	559	1,946	21,562
Hidalgo	43,709	387	6,406	24,574
Quintana Roo	42,829	312	3,293	14,978
Durango	37,026	257	2,539	23,993
Morelos	36,715	386	3,654	21,834
Zacatecas	32,837	242	2,918	20,967
Aguascalientes	27,755	239	2,489	18,136
Tlaxcala	21,034	147	2,614	13,084
Nayarit	18,006	95	1,987	7,646
Colima	15,331	74	1,257	7,734
Campeche	14,334	72	1,445	6,284
Chiapas	13,985	77	1,747	7,175
Source: Secretaría de Salud (2020). Geological and Atmospheric Research Institute

=== Statistics per 100,000 inhabitants ===
As of April 8
State	Cumulative cases (Note: Calculated by dividing the number of cases by the total population of the state and multiplying the result by 100,000.)	Active cases	Deaths (Note: Calculated by dividing the number of deaths by the total population of the state and multiplying the result by 100,000.)	Population (Note: In 2020.)
State	1,794.9	18.8	163.1	126,014,024
Mexico City	6,688.3	96.8	335.3	9,209,944
Baja California Sur	3,606.6	70.1	161.1	798,447
Querétaro	2,764.2	39.7	165.8	2,368,467
Tabasco	2,568.9	32.1	164.4	2,402,598
Sonora	2,411.1	15.5	214.3	2,944,840
San Luis Potosí	2,150.2	14.3	178.3	2,822,255
Coahuila	2,125.7	8.2	187.1	3,146,771
Guanajuato	2,082.8	13.0	164.1	6,166,934
Nuevo León	2,082.7	12.2	156.7	5,784,442
Zacatecas	1,795.6	14.9	165.3	1,622,138
Durango	1,775.4	14.0	125.2	1,832,650
Aguascalientes	1,760.0	16.7	153.2	1,425,607
Tamaulipas	1,557.3	9.3	132.6	3,527,735
Morelos	1,549.5	19.5	146.1	1,971,520
Yucatán	1,532.1	22.0	147.1	2,320,898
Colima	1,488.3	10.1	156.8	731,391
Tlaxcala	1,400.4	10.9	171.7	1,342,977
State of Mexico	1,388.3	14.3	188.1	16,992,418
Jalisco	1,258.6	19.7	151.3	8,348,151
Baja California	1,239.2	7.4	207.8	3,769,020
Chihuahua	1,216.4	3.5	31.5	3,741,869
Puebla	1,211.1	13.8	159.4	6,583,278
Sinaloa	1,207.1	12.0	191.7	3,026,943
Hidalgo	1,200.5	12.5	191.8	3,082,841
Quintana Roo	1,159.5	16.7	135.4	1,857,985
Guerrero	1,075.7	12.3	116.7	3,540,685
Oaxaca	1,068.6	7.6	79.1	4,132,148
Campeche	975.6	7.7	121.9	928,363
Michoacán	961.7	8.5	108.5	4,748,846
Nayarit	922.9	7.6	141.8	1,235,456
Veracruz	722.1	3.7	110.3	8,062,579
Chiapas	190.1	1.3	26.9	5,543,828
Source: Secretariat of Health (2021). Geological and Atmospheric Research Institute; National Institute of Statistics and Geography

== Maps ==
Number of cumulative confirmed cases by state (as of August 10, 2020)

Number of active confirmed cases by state (as of August 10, 2020)

Number of confirmed deaths by state (as of August 10, 2020)

Cumulative cases per 100,000 inhabitants by state (as of August 10, 2020)

Active cases per 100,000 inhabitants by state (as of August 10, 2020)

Number of confirmed recoveries by state (as of August 10, 2020)

Percentage of increase or decrease of new cases by state by week (as of August 11, 2020)

== Phases of contingency ==
According to the Secretariat of Health, there are three phases before the disease (COVID-19) can be considered as an epidemic in the country:

Phase		Time period		Description
Phase		Start	End	Description
1°	Viral Import	February 28, 2020	March 23, 2020	People with the virus caught the disease outside Mexico and there are no cases of local transmission.; A limited number of people are infected with the virus.; There are no restrictions on greetings between people.; Public events remain permitted in all settings.
2°	Community Transmission	March 24, 2020	April 20, 2020	Community transmission: cases are reported between people who have not had contact with foreigners.; The number of confirmed cases has increased rapidly.; Large public events are no longer permitted.; Classes are suspended and people are encouraged to work from home.
3°	Epidemic	April 21, 2020	TBA	Widespread transmission: thousands of cases would have been reported in multiple locations across the country.; Schools and workplaces with active outbreaks would be shuttered.; Implementation of stricter health protocols would occur.; A general quarantine of the population may become necessary.

== Recovery phases ==
On May 13, 2020, the Secretary of Economy Graciela Márquez Colín announced the "Plan for the return to the new normality" (Plan para el regreso a la nueva normalidad in Spanish). The purpose of the plan is to progressively resume productive, social and educational activities that were halted during the phases of contingency to reopen the economy:

Phase		Time period		Description
Phase		Start	End	Description
1°	Phase 1	May 18, 2020	—	Reopening of the 269 "hope municipalities" (municipios de la esperanza in Spanish). The "hope municipalities" are municipalities that have zero confirmed cases of COVID-19 and don't neighbor a municipality with confirmed cases.
2°	Phase 2	May 18, 2020	May 31, 2020	Preparations are being made for the reopening of the country.; The manufacturing of transportation equipment, mining, and construction industries are considered essential activities.
3°	Phase 3	June 1, 2020	—	A "traffic light" coding system is implemented for the gradual reopening of the country. Consisting of four colors (green, yellow, orange, and red) that represent the severity of the pandemic in each state, the "traffic light" will be updated weekly and each color indicates which activities are safe to resume.

=== Traffic light color system ===
The "traffic light" color system would be implemented for the gradual reopening of the country starting June 1, 2020. It would consist of four colors (green, yellow, orange, and red) that represent the severity of the pandemic in each state. The "traffic light" would be updated weekly and each color would indicate which activities are safe to resume.

Color	Health alert	Description	The "traffic light" status of each state as of March 1, 2021.
Green	Low	Classes may resume.; Every aspect of the everyday life will return to normal.	The "traffic light" status of each state as of March 1, 2021.
Yellow	Medium	Non-essential activities may resume at a normal rate without any kind of restriction.; Public gatherings will only have minor restrictions.; Restaurants, churches, movie theaters, and museums may reopen.	The "traffic light" status of each state as of March 1, 2021.
Orange	High	Non-essential activities and public gatherings may resume but at a small scale.; Vulnerable workers, such as pregnant women, older adults and people with a compromised immune system, may return to work but should be given maximum protection.	The "traffic light" status of each state as of March 1, 2021.
Red	Maximum	Only the essential activities will operate. Note that e.g. Mexico City opened some restaurants in January 2021 even though it has this status.	The "traffic light" status of each state as of March 1, 2021.

Traffic light color by state each week
State	Week										
State	0 (Note: May 13–31)	1 (Note: June 1–7)	2 (Note: June 8–14)	3 (Note: June 15–21)	4 (Note: June 22–28)	5 (Note: June 29 – July 5)	6 (Note: July 6–12)	7 (Note: No traffic light presented during week 7)	8 (Note: July 20 – August 2)	9 (Note: August 3–16)	10 (Note: August 17–30)
Aguascalientes											
Baja California											
Baja California Sur											
Campeche											
Chiapas											
Chihuahua											
Coahuila											
Colima											
Durango											
Guanajuato											
Guerrero											
Hidalgo											
Jalisco											
Mexico City											
Michoacán											
Morelos											
Nayarit											
Nuevo León											
Oaxaca											
Puebla											
Querétaro											
Quintana Roo											
San Luis Potosí											
Sinaloa											
Sonora											
State of Mexico											
Tabasco											
Tamaulipas											
Tlaxcala											
Veracruz											
Yucatán											
Zacatecas											
Red status Orange status Yellow status Green status

== Effects ==
=== Economics ===
INEGI estimated an 8.5% decline in GDP in 2020. The International Monetary Fund reported similar figures, but Hacienda (SHCP) reported an 8% decline. According to INEGI, the agricultural sector grew by 2%, but industry fell 10.2% and services fell 7.9%. In November 2020, INEGI reported a 4.4% unemployment rate; there were 55.4 million economically active persons. Nine million of the 12 million who lost their jobs in April, the worst month for the economy, have returned to work.

In February 2021 the National Council for the Evaluation of Social Development Policy (CONEVAL) reported that the health emergency could increase the number of people living below poverty by 8.9 to 9.8 million and extreme poverty by 6.1 to 10.7 million. These are the same levels as a decade ago.

=== Finance ===
The INEGI says the unemployment rate increased from 3.6% in January 2020 to 3.7% in February 2020. The informal sector increased to 56.3% in February compared to 56.0% in February 2019.

The Mexican Stock Exchange fell to a record low on March 10 due to fears of the coronavirus and because of falling oil prices. The Bank of Mexico (Banxico) stepped in to prop up the value of the peso, which fell 14% to 22.929 per US dollar. World markets are seeing falls similar to those of 1987. Moody's Investors Service predicted that the economy will contract 5.2% during the first trimester of the year and 3.7% by the end of the year. Banxico announced on April 1 that foreign investors have withdrawn MXN $150 billion (US$6.3 billion) from Mexico, mostly in Certificados de la Tesorería (Treasury Certificates, Cetes) since February 27 when the first COVID-19 case in Mexico was diagnosed. The problem is compounded by the low oil price, only US$10.37 per barrel, a 20.29% drop since the beginning of the 2020 Russia–Saudi Arabia oil price war.

Some financial analysts say there has been too little, too late. Carlos Serrano of BBVA México predicts a 4.5% economic contraction in 2020, while analysts at Capital Economics in London argue that the government has to do more to support the economy. They forecast a 6% contraction this year. HR Ratings, Latin America's first credit rating agency, said that the performance of the economy this year will depend on the government's response to the COVID-19 crisis. Inflation slowed to 2.08% during the first half of April, the lowest figure in four years.

In May, BBVA predicted that 58.4% of the Mexican population would live below the poverty line by the end of 2020, an increase of 12 million people. Extreme poverty is expected to grow by 12.3 million people, 26.6% of the population. The bank predicts GDP will fall by 12%. Citibanamex predicts a 7.6% decline in GDP. The economy contracted 17.1% and the GDP fell 18.7% during the second trimester of 2020. This was slightly less than predicted, but it far surpassed the previous record of 8.6% in 1995.

The Mexican Association of Insurance Institutions (AMIS) reported in September that they have paid out US$288 million in claims, making the pandemic the thirteenth most expensive disaster in history.

=== Industries ===
==== Automobile production and sales ====
The association of car dealers, ADMA, predicts a decrease in sales in Mexico between 16% and 25% this year. J.D. Power estimated a 20% decrease, 264,000 vehicles, in Mexico and a 15% drop across the world. The Employers Confederation of the Mexican Republic (COPARMEX) criticized the government on March 29 for not suspending the payment of taxes, saying the government does not care about unemployment. Fernando Treviño Núñez, president of the organization, explained that businesses cannot afford to pay salaries for more than three months without receiving income. Gasoline and diesel fuel importers have not noted a decrease in demand since the onset of the COVID-19 pandemic, and they fear that health precautions could cause fuel delays at ports of entry. Watco said that cargo on the Houston Ship Channel for delivery to San Luis Potosí increased 25% in March compared to January. Mexico imports 65% of its gasoline.

The Asociación Mexicana de Distribuidores de Automotores (Association of Mexican Automobile Distributors) reported a decline of 28% in auto sales from 2019 to 2020.

==== Beer, wine, and spirits ====
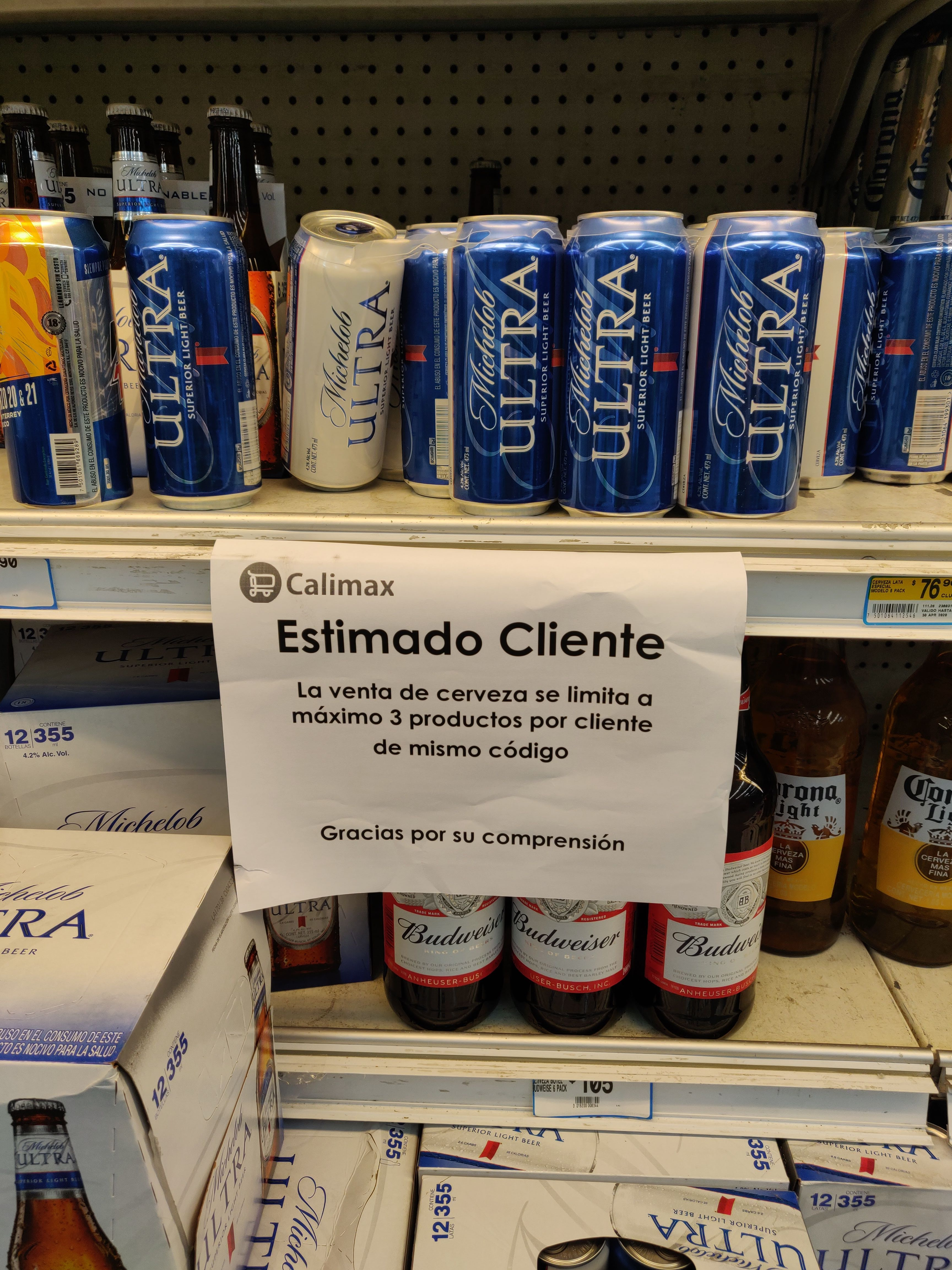
Beer products were limited to three per customer during COVID-19 pandemic shortly after beer brewing was suspended in Mexico

On March 24, Grupo Modelo, makers of Corona beer, promised to donate 300,000 bottles of antibacterial gel to the Mexican Social Security Institute (IMSS). The Canacintra (National Chamber of the Processing Industry) announced on April 2 they were suspending all beer production in the country, as breweries are not an essential industry and there was sufficient supply in the country for a month. Tequila producers plan to stay open.

==== Construction ====
INEGI reported that construction fell by 24.7% in 2020. 72,000 jobs were lost.

==== Education industry ====
Alfredo Villar, president of the 6,000-member National Association of Private Schools, says that many schools will have to close for the 2020–2021 school year. The 3,500-member National Confederation of Private Schools (CNEP) says most of their members have reported drops in enrollment from 30% to 60%. The group's president, María de Jesús Zamarripa, said, "With fewer than five children in each group, many schools will be forced to cut personnel." 48,000 private schools served 5 million pupils in 2019–2020, 15% of the total student population.

University enrollment for 2020–2021 is expected to fall between 12% and 15%. Approximately 66% of the 4.1 million students enrolled in institutions of higher education attend public schools. Of the 1/3 in private schools, 20% attend schools of high prestige and 13% attend small specialized schools. It is these schools that are particularly vulnerable to closing because of a drop in enrollment.

==== Energy ====
Gasoline sales fell 70% between April 10 and 18, threatening the financial future of gas stations. Meanwhile, the port of Veracruz is saturated and tankers are stranded off the coast due to low prices. Airbnb offers free accommodations for health care workers.

==== Film and entertainment ====
On May 27, film director Alfonso Cuarón plead employers to continue to pay the wages of more than 2.3 million housekeepers that have been left without wages because of the outbreak stating that "It is our responsibility as employers to pay their wages in this time of uncertainty".

==== Health industry ====
IMSS reported that Mexico lost 1,113,677 formal jobs from March to June: 130,593 during March, 555,247 in April, 304,526 in May, and 83,311 in June. Considering that new jobs were created in January and February 2020, the balance was a loss of 921,583 jobs for the first six months of the year.

==== Mining ====
The Cámara Minera de México (Chamber of Commerce for Mining, CAMINMEX) reported a 50% decline in investments in mining, from US$4.5 billion to $2.5 billion, in 2020.

==== Retail ====
As of April 22, Grupo Salinas with its 70,000 employees, continues to operate as if the pandemic were nonexistent. Even after the rest of the country entered Phase 3 in late April, its stores remain open, social distancing is not enforced, and employees do not use face masks. The United States pressed Mexico in late April to reopen factories that are key to the U.S. supply chain, including those with military contracts, as employees staged walkouts and expressed fear of contracting COVID-19. Lear Corporation acknowledges there have been coronavirus-related deaths among its 24,000 employees in Ciudad Juárez, but will not say how many.

The Unión de Retailers de México ("Union of Retailers of Mexico, URM") said that between 1,500 and 2,500 businesses in shopping centers, between 9.3% and 18% of the 14,000 stores in Mexico City, were forced to close in April 2020 because they could not pay their rent.

The Asociación Nacional de Tiendas de Autoservicios y Departamentales (National Association of Self-service and Department Stores, ANTAD), reported a 60% decline in sales of clothing and footwear between March and June 2020. Clothing manufacturers lost 45,000 employees in the same period.

==== Sex workers ====
According to the Brigada Callejera de Apoyo a la Mujer Elisa Martínez, (Elisa Martínez Street Brigade in Support of Women), the number of sex workers on the streets of Mexico City increased from 7,500 in April to 10,000 in August. Among the reasons given are the closure of bars and hotels. Street workers are vulnerable to gang violence and extortion as well as societal hostility. Workers report they have to work harder but their incomes have fallen.

==== Tourism and hospitality ====
The Consejo Nacional Empresarial Turístico (National Tourism Business Council, CNET) sent two letters in March to Alfonso Romo, Chief of Staff to the President, outlining the importance of tourism to the economy and asking for government support for the sector. Tourism provides 4 million jobs in Mexico, and 93% of the companies have ten or fewer employees. COVID-19 has forced the closure of 4,000 hotels (52,400 rooms) and 2,000 restaurants, while the airline industry has lost MXN $30 billion (US$1.3 billion). Tourism accounts for 10% of Gross domestic product (GDP) in the world.

The Secretary of Tourism (SECUTUR) announced that the number of foreign tourists who arrived by air between January and July 2020 was 57.5% (5.7 million tourists) less than during the same time period of 2019. The Cancún International Airport reported a 59% decline and the number of tourists at the Mexico City International Airport fell by 62.4%.

Metropolitan Mexico City permanently lost 13,500 restaurants, representing 450,000 out of 5.6 million direct and indirect jobs, by the end of 2020.

==== Virus-related ====
General Motors (GM) announced that by late April 2020 its Toluca plant would start producing 1.5 million surgical face masks per month for use in hospitals in the states of Mexico, San Luis Potosí, Coahuila, Guanajuato, and Mexico City.

A team of medical experts and veterinarians led by Pedro Guillermo Mar Hernandez of Hermosillo Technological Center and Pedro Ortega Romero of Sonora State University developed a ventilator that can be used by six COVID-19 patients at a time.

=== Panic buying ===
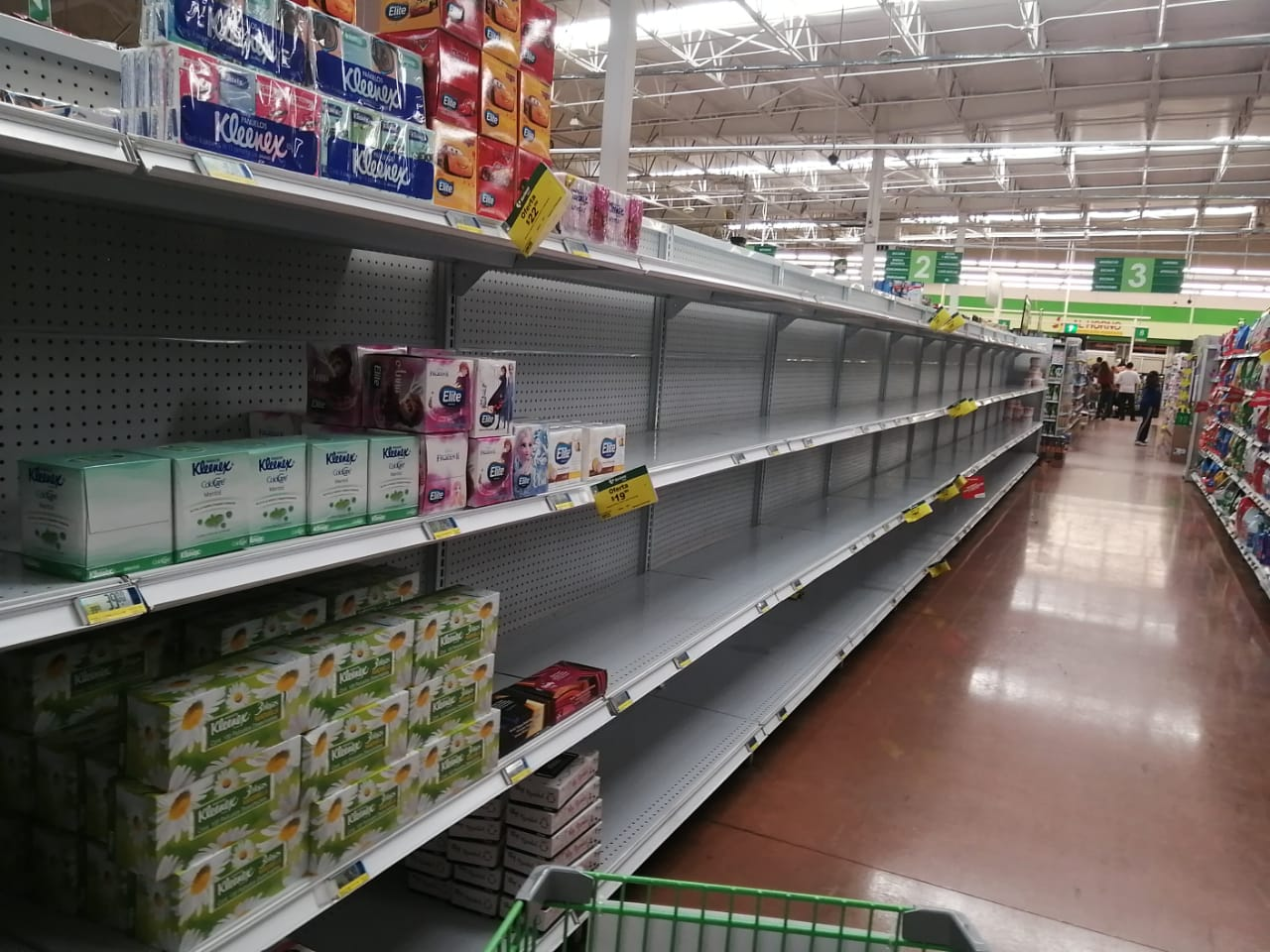
Panic buying of toilet paper at a Soriana supermarket in Ensenada, Baja California

Panic buying in mid-March caused shortages in Mexico of hydroxychloroquine and azithromycin, which U.S. President Donald Trump, with no backing from the scientific or medical communities, said is helpful in preventing COVID-19. The Comisión Federal para la Protección de Riesgos Sanitarios (Federal Commission for the Protection of Health Risks, Cofepris) put controls on the sale of both products. Hidroxicloroquina is used in the treatment of malaria, lupus and rheumatoid arthritis. Plaquenil tablets are produced in Mexico by the French company Sanofi; the raw material comes from Hungary. Shortages of medicine for these diseases were expected soon.

In mid-March, retailers in the border city of Tijuana experienced shortages of water and toilet paper as Americans from southern California began crossing the border to panic-buy these items. Purchase limits were placed on several item categories following the first wave of panic buying by foreigners.

=== Crime ===
Authorities are concerned about supermarket robberies. A gang of 70 people robbed a grocery store in Tecámac, State of Mexico, on March 23, and a gang of 30 looted a supermarket in the city of Oaxaca on March 24. Calls for supermarket looting, warning of food shortages, are making the rounds of social media. Four such social media groups in Tijuana were broken up in Baja California on March 29. The number of murders has not decreased due to the coronavirus pandemic, and drug cartels are fighting each other in Guerrero and Michoacan.

On April 14, José Luis Calderón, vice president of the Mexican Association of Private Security Companies (AMESP), commenting on the increase of crime, told El Informador,

Taking advantage of the COVID-19 crisis, there have been opportunistic people who have sought to loot and have tried to carry out robberies... We know that cell phones, household appliances, liquor, cigarettes and merchandise that are not essential items have been stolen.

Travel restrictions are making it more difficult for Mexican drug cartels to operate, because chemicals from China, which are the raw materials for synthesizing illegal drugs, cannot be imported. As a result, the price of illegal methamphetamine has increased from 2,500 pesos (€95/$102) to 15,000 pesos per pound. Cartels are also struggling to smuggle drugs across the border to the United States, where many customers live, because border crossings have been shut down. The reduction in international air travel has made it easier for authorities to track planes used for transporting illegal drugs.

In May, three different families, relatives of patients with COVID-19, were attacked in Cuajimalpa, Mexico City.

== Government response ==
=== Employment Protection ===
In June 2020, Mexico's open unemployment rate was 5.5 percent in, representing an increase of 1.3 percentage points from a month earlier. The Government of Mexico reiterated that the declaration of the health emergency doesn't have to result in loss of job or in wage reduction. Businesses that couldn't continue to pay pre-pandemic wages were recommended to approach Federal Attorney for the Defense of Labor to find solution that will be in the best interest of both parties. The Ministry of Economy awarded loans with optional repayment totaling 37.9 billion pesos to companies with payroll employees, self-employed workers, and 26.6 billion pesos to family businesses that were previously registered in the Welfare Census. For three months, the government subsidized unemployment insurance for workers who have a mortgage with the Housing Institute (5.9 billion pesos). Additional funding was committed to housing projects (4 billion pesos).

The Mexican Health Ministry provided permission for employees in high-risk groups—such as those over 65 years old and pregnant women—to remain home keeping their salary. Almost 60% of jobs in Mexico are informal. Nonetheless, there were virtually no federal-level policies aimed at mitigating the income shock experienced by informal workers but most of the country's states implemented their own programs to support informal workers. Overall, Mexican response to the employment crisis was criticized for austerity and described as insufficient by population .

=== Mandatory mask laws ===
Mask mandates per Mexican state

Most states have implemented face mask mandates in some form or another. In the majority of states, this means wearing a face mask at all times outside of someones residence (both inside and outside), while other states have only required someone to wear a mask inside businesses or on public transit.

=== Timeline ===
==== January–March 2020 ====
- January 9, 2020 – A travel advisory for people traveling to or from China was issued.
- January 22 – The Secretariat of Health issued a statement saying that the novel coronavirus COVID-19 did not present a danger to Mexico.
- January 30 – The Government of Mexico designed a Preparation and Response Plan that was made by the National Committee for Health Safety, a working group led by Secretariat of Health composed by different health entities aiming to act upon the imminent arrival of the pandemic. This group carried out a series of alert measures, rehabilitation and updating of epidemiological regulations based on the International Health Regulations.
- March 5 – The National Governors' Conference (Conago) met to discuss the coronavirus outbreak. The directors of INSABI, IMSS and ISSSTE also participated.
- March 6 – Hugo López-Gatell Ramírez led the first daily press conference on COVID-19.
- March 10 – As the stock market and the price of oil fell, "Banxico" stepped in to prop up the value of the peso, which had fallen 14%.
- March 13 – The National Autonomous University of Mexico suspended in-person classes. Authorities canceled or postponed major tourist events in Guadalajara and Merida.

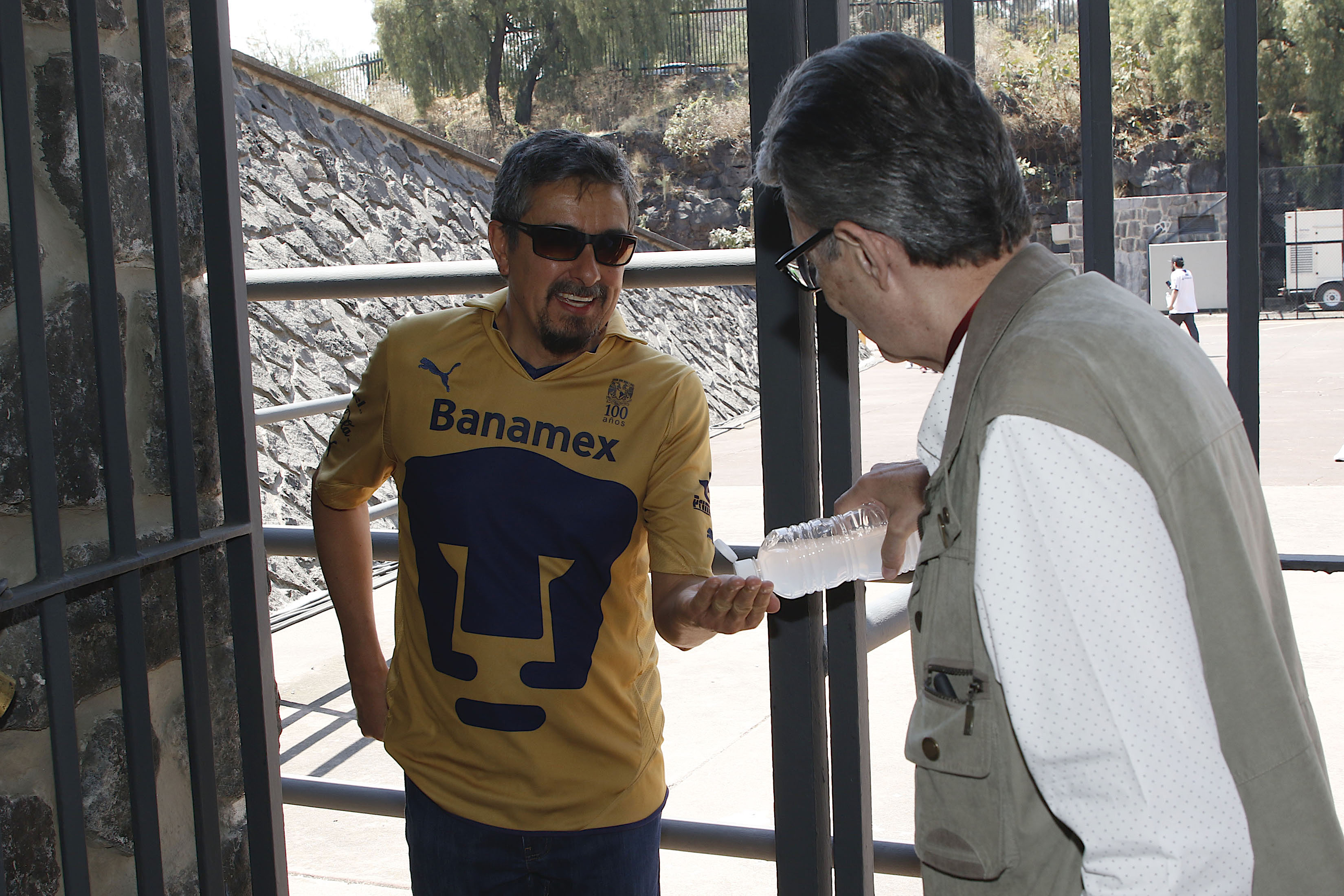
On March 14, 2020, sport events such as female football matches were open to the public. At Estadio Olímpico Universitario, authorities were pouring hand sanitizer at the entrance

- March 14
  - The SEP announced that all sporting and civic events in schools would be canceled and that Easter break, originally planned from April 6 to 17, would be extended from March 20 to April 20. On March 31 the school closings were extended through April 30.
  - The SCHP announced it was taking measures to prevent a 0.5% fall in GDP.
  - The "Universidad Autónoma de Nuevo León" (UANL) suspended classes for its more than 206,000 students starting on March 17.
- March 15 – Mexico City mayor Claudia Sheinbaum declared that Mexico City expected to spend an extra MXN $100 million to prevent the spread of COVID-19.
- March 18 – Authorities announced that they were looking for hundreds of citizens who might be carriers of the coronavirus, especially in the states of Puebla, Jalisco, Aguascalientes and Guerrero. The Autonomous University of Guerrero (UAGRO) in Chilpancingo closed after a female student tested positive for the virus.
- March 22
  - Bars, nightclubs, movie theaters and museums were closed in Mexico City.
  - Governor Alfaro Ramírez announces that Jalisco and seven other states would block flights from areas such as that had a high rate of coronavirus. He also said that they would purchase 25,000 testing kits.
  - Governor Jaime Rodríguez Calderón of Nuevo León said he will not rule out the use of force to get people to stay at home.
- March 23
  - The WHO announced that Mexico had entered into the community contact phase of infection.
  - The National Campaign of Healthy Distancing, a national program of non-pharmaceutical measures based on social distancing, began. A media campaign led by "Susana Distancia", who is a fictional female superhero aiming to promote social distancing, was launched. "Susana Distancia" is a wordplay on 'su sana distancia', meaning "his/her healthy distance".
  - Access to supermarkets, drugstores and convenience stores in Coahuila was limited to one person per family, and the temperature of that person was taken before entering.
- March 24 – President López Obrador announced that Mexico had entered Phase 2 of the coronavirus pandemic, in effect until April 30. Gatherings of more than 100 people were prohibited, and both the Mexican Army and the Mexican Navy would participate.
- March 25
  - President López Obrador ordered the Mexican Air Force to rescue Mexicans trapped in Argentina.
  - Office of the Federal Prosecutor for the Consumer (Profeco) closed two businesses in Tijuana, Baja California, for price-gouging.
  - In Mexico City, Claudia Sheinbaum announced financial support for families and micro industries affected by the pandemic, and she suspended automobile smog checks through April 19. She closed movie theaters, bars, nightclubs, gyms and other entertainment centers.
  - The government announced that it would continue receiving cruise ships "for humanitarian reasons", but that passengers would be individually "fumigated" before being taken directly to airports to be returned to their home countries. The protocol will apply to the MS Europa, currently docked in Puerto Vallarta.
- March 26
  - President López Obrador addressed the Group of Twenty regarding medical supplies and trade and tariffs. The federal government announced it would suspend most sectors' activities from March 26 to April 19.
  - The Secretary of Health estimated that Phase 3 of the pandemic, when the number of cases reaches its peak, will be about April 19.
  - Authorities in Chihuahua announced that it would start to quarantine migrants who were returned to the Ciudad Juárez border crossing.
  - The Comisión Federal para la Protección de Riesgos Sanitarios (Federal Commission for the Protection of Health Risks, Cofepris) put controls on the sale of hydroxychloroquine and azithromycin, used in the treatment of malaria, lupus and rheumatoid arthritis, but not shown to be effective against COVID-19. Nonetheless, panic buying of these medicines is likely to soon lead to a shortage.
- March 27
  - President López Obrador practiced social distancing during his tour in Nayarit. The president had been widely criticized for shaking hands, kissing and hugging as he met with people.
  - The federal government bought 5,000 ventilators from China.
  - Profeco (Office of the Federal Prosecutor for the Consumer) announced it would fine merchants who unfairly raised the prices on household goods.
  - Víctor Villalobos Arámbula, Secretary of Agriculture and Rural Development (SADER) met with food producers to discuss guaranteeing the food supply in spite of the pandemic.
- March 28
  - Hugo López-Gatell Ramírez, Deputy Secretary of Health, said that with 16 deaths and 848 cases of infection, this is the last opportunity to prevent accelerated growth of COVID-19. He called on the population to act responsibly to prevent its spread. Milenio reported that López-Gatell said there is a legal basis for the use of force to enforce stay-at-home orders during the COVID-19 pandemic.
  - Health officials, accompanied by a representative of the military and Foreign Secretary Marcelo Ebrard made a video urging the populace to stay home. President López Obrador did not appear in that video, but he made a separate one with the same message.

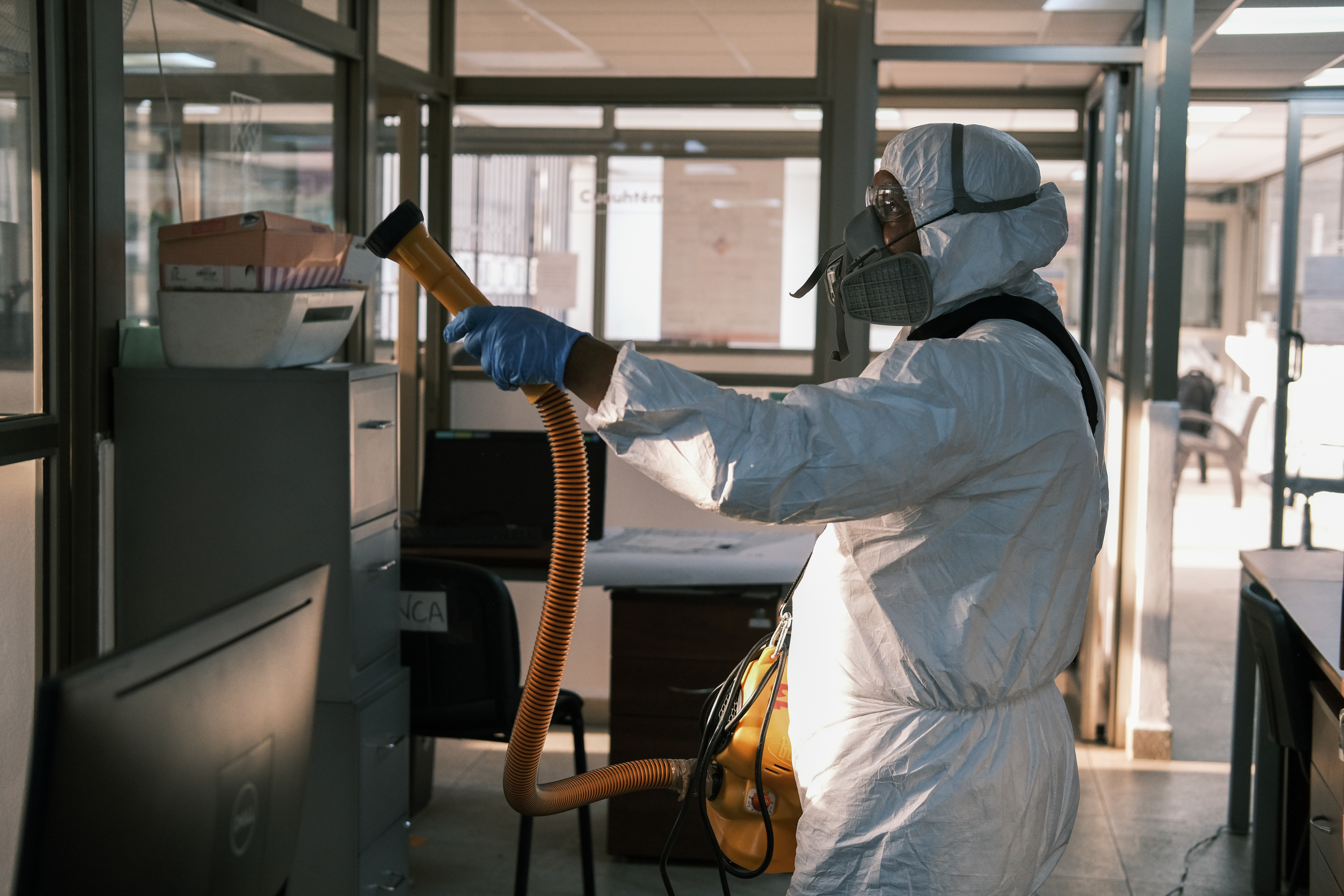
Government offices in Cuauhtémoc borough sanitized on March 30

- March 30 – A national health emergency was declared in Mexico and stricter measures aimed at containing the spread of the virus were introduced.

==== April–May 2020 ====
- April 1
  - Beaches throughout the country are closed.
  - INEGI asked everyone who has not taken part of the 2020 census to contact them via their webpage or by calling them before April 15.
  - The Governor of Nuevo León ordered a halt to production and distribution of beer in the state, beginning April 3.
- April 3
  - President López Obrador issued a decree to abolish 100 public trusts related to science and culture; the Finance Ministry (SHCP) will receive the money directly. The move is expected to save MXN $250 billion (US$10 billion), which can be spent to strengthen the economy, pay for social programs and pay off the debt.
  - Claudia Sheinbaum promised to donate two months of her salary (a total of MXN $156,728) to the struggle against COVID-19 and invited other officials to do so also.
- April 5
  - President López Obrador presented his plan to reactivate the economy without increasing fuel prices or taxes. He said he would increase oil production and that he had support from the private sector.
  - A health official in Oaxaca was fired after spitting on doctors, nurses, and patients at the Hospital Regional del ISSSTE "Presidente Juárez" because the service was slow.
- April 7 – Governor Diego Sinhué Rodríguez Vallejo of Guanajuato announced he would donate his salary (MXN $153,000) during the contingency.
- April 8 – Cuauhtémoc Blanco Bravo of Morelos announced that he would donate his salary to support families who do not have incomes during the crisis. Thirty confirmed cases and five deaths have been reported in the state.
- April 10 – José Ignacio Precaido Santos of the General Health Council announced that at least 146 private hospitals will make beds available to treat COVID-19 patients on a non-profit basis.
- April 11 – The Federal Electricity Commission (CFE) announced it would not forgive payments because of the pandemic. They reiterated their commitment to invest MXN $8 billion during the presidency of Lopez Obrador and emphasised the need to pay their 90,000 employees.
- April 12 – The government established the "National Contingency Center" (Spanish: Centro de Contingencias Nacional, CNC) to fight COVID-19. It will be led by the military and will have scientists and health technicians advising about steps to combat the pandemic.
- April 13 – The Mexican Navy announced it would open ten voluntary self-isolation units to shelter 4,000 COVID-19 patients in Mexico City, Guerrero, Jalisco, Michoacan, Sinaloa, Tamaulipas and Veracruz.
- April 16
  - The government announced on April 16 that it will restrict transportation between areas of the country that are infected with COVID-19 (mostly large cities) and areas that are not infected, without specifying what areas are included or how it will be enforced.
  - President López Obrador also said that based upon current projections, the 979 municipalities that have not had reported cases of coronavirus will be able to reopen schools and workplaces on May 17; the date is June 1 for the 463 municipalities that have. The elderly and other vulnerable groups will still be requested to stay home, and physical distancing should remain in place until May 30. It is expected that the pandemic will end in the metropolitan area on June 25.
- April 17 – AMLO pledges MXN $60 billion (US$2.5 billion) to help small businesses in May.
- April 18 – The Health Ministry says that unclaimed bodies of the deceased related to COVID-19 should not be cremated or buried in common graves, but should be photographed, fingerprinted and buried in marked graves. In cases of suspected or confirmed cases of coronavirus, the bodies cannot be exhumed for at least 180 days after the date of death.
- April 21
  - The government announced that Mexico had entered Phase 3 of its contingency plan.
  - The Secretariat of the Civil Service (SFP) announced that the deadline for public servants to declare their assets was extended from May 1 to July 31.
- May 4 – Plan DN III of Sedena and Plan Marina of SEMAR begin.
- May 13
  - Graciela Márquez Colín, the Director of Economic Affairs, spells out a three-phased plan to reopen the economy beginning on May 18. During the first phase, 269 municipalities without infections in 15 states will be allowed to lift their stay-at-home orders.
  - The Secretariat of Public Education (SEP) plans to reopen schools on June 1, but the governors of Puebla, Jalisco, Michoacán, Guerrero, and Baja California Sur say they will not be ready. Esteban Moctezuma of the SEP promised that no school would open without a "green-light" about safety.
- May 20 – Mexico City mayor presented the "Gradual Plan towards the New Normality in Mexico City" after the health emergency and estimated that the city will be at a red light at least until June 15, although the situation may change to orange at that time.
- May 29
  - Thirty-one entities were classified as "Maximum Risk;" Zacatecas was the only exception.
  - The SEP set August 10 as the new tentative date for reopening schools across the country.

==== June–July 2020 ====
- June 5
  - As the school year ends, the SEP announces that grades and certification will be available online. The summer program will begin on June 8 and enrollment for the 2020–2021 school year will be August 6 and 7 and the new school year will begin on August 10.
  - The Secretariat of Culture publishes guidelines for the reopening of cultural spaces, such as archaeological zones, museums, and theaters.
- June 10 – Mayor Claudia Sheinbaum said that Mexico City will begin wide testing for the COVID-19 virus with plans to reach 100,000 tests in July. Testing will be paired with an intensive information campaign and an attempt at contact tracing.
- June 11 – Governor Francisco Domínguez Servién of Queretaro announces that the state will reopen non-essential services on June 17.
- June 12 – The State Health Committee in Baja California Sur announced that non-essential businesses will reopen on June 14.
- June 25 – The governor of Jalisco announces partial reopening of theaters, parks, and athletic facilities beginning June 29.
- July 9 – Mexican Social Security Institute (IMSS) said it will reopen its 1,411 day care centers (Spanish: guarderías) on July 20 in order to train employees about health safety procedures. No children will return until later. Of the interviewed parents, about 48% of them said that their children were going to return to day care when the "traffic light" is green and 12% said they wanted their children to return in August.
- July 11
  - Undersecretary Hugo López-Gatell said that the Secretariat of Health was putting on hold the presentation of next week's "traffic light" due to the inconsistencies found on the data that certain states were reporting. Yucatán and Quintana Roo, states that were pointed out by López-Gatell for their inconsistencies and delayed reporting, said that they were fully complying with what they were asked to report.
  - Tlaltetela, Veracruz, announced a curfew from 10:00 pm to 6:00 am.
- July 12
  - The government of Mexico City revealed the list of 34 neighborhoods with the most infections, 20% of the total. San José Zacatepec, Xochimilco, has an index of 1,084.4/100,000 inhabitants; followed by San Salvador Cuauhtenco, Milpa Alta (767.4/100,000); and Colonia Aldana, Azcapotzalco (388.6/100,000). Updates will be provided every Sunday.
  - The municipalities of Felipe Carrillo Puerto, José María Morelos, Bacalar, and Othón P. Blanco in Quintana Roo announced that they will be returning to red status on the "traffic light" until July 19.
- July 13
  - Mexico City begins to offer online divorces.
  - The Secretariat of Public Education (SEP) announced that school certificates and report cards were going to be available online.
- July 15 – Claudia Sheinbaum announces a plan to combat the virus in 34 neighborhoods that have returned to a red status on the "traffic light". The plans include sanitizing public spaces, the set up of temporary health centers, and provide food and economic support. The 34 neighborhoods are spread over 12 of the 16 boroughs and include three in Álvaro Obregón, one in Azcapotzalco, four in Coyoacán, two in Cuauhtémoc, one in Iztapalapa, six in Magdalena Contreras, two in Miguel Hidalgo, three in Milpa Alta, two in Tláhuac, four in Tlalpan, one in Venustiano Carranza, and six in Xochimilco.
- July 23 – The CDMX issued a new schedule for access to the Historical Center that included closing of streets to vehicular traffic.
- July 30 – President López Obrador announced that non-essential federal employees will return to work on October 1, 2020, and assured that measures will be implemented to guarantee the public health.

==== August–September 2020 ====
- August 3 – The SEP announces that classes will resume on August 24, mostly online. Families without internet will have access through radio or television.
- August 10 – According to a report in the New York Times, Mexicans are avoiding hospitals for fear of Covid 19.
- August 13 – President López Obrador decrees a thirty day period of mourning for victims of the pandemic, from August 13 to September 11. This is in addition to the minute of silence offered during the President's daily press conferences.
- August 14 – The SEP releases its 2020–2021 calendar with 190 days of classes.
- September 10 – INAH reopens the Teotihuacan archaeological site at 30% capacity.
- September 17
  - Hospital Hidalgo announces it will begin organ transplants, suspended since March, the week of September 21. Fifty patients have been waiting for kidneys.
  - Papalote Children's Museum in CDMX reopens.
- September 18 – INAH plans to reopen the Chichén Itzá archaeological site on September 22 with a maximum capacity of 30% (3,000 people). The date coincides with the September equinox.

==== October–December 2020 ====
- December 8
  - Distribution of the vaccine will begin late in December, after the Pfizer vaccine is approved in the United States and by Mexican authorities. First to receive the vaccine will be 125,000 health workers in CDMX and the state of Coahuila; full coverage will take until 2022.
  - Dr. López-Gatell said that reopening of schools depends on health decisions, not production or distribution of a vaccine.
- December 19 – January 10 – Mexico City and the State of Mexico close non-essential businesses.
- December 21
  - Claudia Sheinbaum denies a report by The New York Times that her government falsified COVID data earlier this month to avoid declaring a stage red emergency.
  - Guadalajara and Puerto Vallarta will ban non-essential activities starting December 25.

==== January–March 2021 ====
- January 7 – Governor Mauricio Vila Dosal of Yucatan announces that the first phase of vaccines in the state will begin on January 12.
- January 8
  - Governor Carlos Miguel Aysa González of Campeche warns that the state may return to Yellow Alert for the first time since September 25 due to an increase in COVID-19 infections.
  - Mexico City Head of Government Sheinbaum announces that the payroll tax will be forgiven for restaurants during January.
  - UNAM offers ultrafreezers with a capacity of 10,500 liters to the government. Said freezers could store three or four million doses of the Pfizer vaccine at a temperature of −70 °C.
- January 9 – Joel Ayala Almeida, leader of the Federación de Sindicatos de Trabajadores al Servicio del Estado (government employees union, FSTSE), welcomes Cuban health workers who are arriving to held in the struggle against the pandemic.
- January 18 – Restaurants with terraces open in Mexico City, even though the area continues in "stoplight red" status.
- January 29 – AMLO declares that Mexico will import Oxford–AstraZeneca COVID-19 vaccine from India and produce some in Mexico starting February. Pfizer shipments should resume February 15.
- February 2 – Dr. Hugo López-Gatell announces that the Comisión Federal para la Protección contra Riesgos Sanitarios (Federal Commission for the Protection against Sanitary Risks, COFEPRIS) has authorized emergency use of the Sputnik V vaccine.
- February 4
  - INSABI declares it will purchase the Moderna COVID-19 vaccine starting July.
  - AMLO, 67, reported he was healthy after a negative COVID-19 test, and he would soon be out of quarantine. He announced his illness on January 24.
- February 12 – Mexico City, Mexico State, and Jalisco move from Red to Orange alert.
- February 14 – 870,000 doses of AstraZeneca vaccine arrive from India.
- February 16 – 461,000 doses of Pfizer vaccine scheduled to arrive.
- February 20 – Dr. López-Gatell announced he had tested positive for the COVID-19 virus.
- February 24
  - Nearly 20,000 elderly people (60+) received the first dosis of the Sputnik V vaccine on the first of ten days in Iztacalco, Tláhuac and Xochimilco boroughs.
  - The tenth vaccination center in Ecatepec opens at Universidad Estatal del Valle de Ecatepec with 200,000 doses of the Sinovac vaccine.
  - López-Gatell was hospitalized at the Hospital Temporal Citi-Banamex.
- February 25 – Vaccinations begin with 20,450 doses of the Pfizer vaccine in Puerto Vallarta, Jalisco.
- March 1 – The White House said that the United States would not be sharing vaccines with Mexico until all of its domestic needs were satisfied.
- March 13 – AMLO announces that before the school year ends, teachers will be vaccinated and in-person classes will resume.

== Cancellations, suspensions, and closings ==
Archaeological sites

Teotihuacán, Xochicalco, El Tepozteco closed March 21–22, 2020. Chichén Itzá closed indefinitely starting March 21. Archaeological sites were reopened at partial capacity in mid-to-late September.

Education
Basic educationThe SEP announced on March 14, 2020, that all sporting and civic events in schools would be cancelled and that Easter break would be from March 20 to April 20. Remote learning (on-line, television, radio) for the 2020–2021 school year began in August.
Higher education: The UNAM and Tec de Monterrey, switched to virtual classes on March 13. Autonomous University of the State of Morelos (UAEM) suspended classes on March 16. Autonomous University of Nuevo Leon (UANL) suspended classes from March 17 to April 20. Autonomous University of Guerrero (UAGRO) and Technical Institute of Guerrero (Chilpancingo) closed March 18. Colleges and universities across the country began a combination of on-line and in-person classes in September.
The es:Feria Internacional del Libro del Palacio de Minería (International book fair at the Palacio de Minería) is held virtually for the first time from February 18 to March 1, 2021.

Entertainment

OCESA cancelled all its events until April 19, 2020.

Fairs: Authorities announced on March 14 they were considering the cancellation of the Festival Internacional de Cine de Guadalajara. In Mérida, the Tianguis Turístico was postponed to September. On January 21, 2021, it was announced that the Feria Nacional de San Marcos in Aguascalientes would be canceled for the second year in a row.
Musical: Chicago suspended until April 17, 2020.
Concerts: The Magic Numbers, Los Tigres del Norte, Red Orange County [sic], Mercury Rev, María León, Sasha Sloan and Ricky Martin
Conference: Michelle Obama
Other: Bars, nightclubs, movie theaters, and museums were closed in Mexico City on March 22, 2020.
Government

President López Obrador suspended non-essential activities from March 26 to April 19, 2020. The health and energy sectors, the oil industry, and public services such as water supply, waste management and public safety continued to function.

Industry

Ford Motor Company, Honda and Audi closed their manufacturing plants in Mexico on March 18. Hundreds of hotel employees in Cancún were fired. Alsea (Starbucks, VIPS, Domino's Pizza, Burger King, Italianni's, Chili's, California Pizza Kitchen, P. F. Chang's China Bistro and The Cheesecake Factory) offered its employees unpaid leave. PROFECO closed two businesses in Tijuana Baja California, for price-gouging on March 25. Cinépolis and Cinemex announced that they will temporarily close all of their theaters starting March 25.

Izta-Popo Zoquiapan National Park

The Izta-Popo Zoquiapan National Park was partially reopened in March 2021 after closing for nearly a year.

Ports of entry
Air: Governor Alfaro Ramírez of Jalisco announced that beginning Thursday, March 26, eight states in the Bajío and western Mexico would block flights from areas that had a high rate of coronavirus. The restrictions would apply at the Miguel Hidalgo y Costilla Guadalajara International Airport and the Licenciado Gustavo Díaz Ordaz International Airport in Puerto Vallarta.
Land: The United States Department of State announced on March 20 there would be restrictions on travel across the Mexico–United States border. The restrictions would not apply to cargo. On March 26, protesters in Sonora insisted that the government limit border crossings with the United States. The state of Chihuahua announced that it would start to quarantine migrants who are returned to the Ciudad Juárez border crossing. Citizens of Nogales, Sonora, blocked border crossing from Nogales, Arizona, to prevent the entrance of individuals with the virus infection and to prevent shortages of food, bottled water, toilet paper and cleaning supplies in local stores.
Sea: The government announced on March 25 it would continue receiving cruise ships but that passengers would be individually "fumigated" before being taken directly to airports to be returned to their home countries.
Sports

Jalisco Open (tennis tournament) and CONCACAF Champions League (soccer) cancelled March 13.

Formula One's Mexican Grand Prix, which has scheduled on November 1, has cancelled on July 24 due to travel restrictions in the Americas and the host circuit has turned into COVID-19 emergency hospital.

Religious events

On March 17, the Passion Play of Iztapalapa in Mexico City moved to an undisclosed location indoors and televised on April 10.

San Luis Potosí suspended wakes and funerals on March 29.

Curfew established

Mayor Juanita Romero (PAN) of Nacozari de García, Sonora, declared a curfew in effect until April 20.

Greater Mexico City transportation
Mexico City Metro:

Line 1: Juanacatlán.
Line 2: Allende, Panteones, Popotla.
Line 4: Talismán, Bondojito, Canal del Norte, Fray Servando.
Line 5: Aragón, Eduardo Molina, Hangares, Misterios, Valle Gómez.
Line 6: Norte 45, Tezozómoc.
Line 7: Constituyentes, Refinería, San Antonio.
Line 8: Aculco, Cerro de la Estrella, La Viga, Obrera.
Line 9: Ciudad Deportiva, Lázaro Cárdenas, Mixiuhca, Velódromo.
Line 12: Eje Central, San Andrés Tomatlán, Tlaltenco.
Line A: Agrícola Oriental, Canal de San Juan, Peñón Viejo.
Line B: Olímpica, Deportivo Oceanía, Romero Rubio, Tepito.

Mexico City Metrobús:

Line 1: San Simón, Buenavista II, El Chopo, Campeche, Nápoles, Ciudad de los Deportes, Francia, Olivo, Ciudad Universitaria, Centro Cultural Universitario
Line 2: Nicolás Bravo, Del Moral, CCH Oriente, Río Tecolutla, Álamos, Dr. Vértiz, Escandón, Antonio Maceo
Line 3: Poniente 146, Poniente 134, Héroe de Nacozari, La Raza, Ricardo Flores Magón, Buenavista III, Obrero Mundial
Line 5: Preparatoria 3, Río Guadalupe, Victoria, Río Santa Coleta, Archivo General de la Nación
Line 6: Ampliación Providencia, 482, 416 Oriente, Francisco Morazán
Line 7: Hospital Infantil La Villa, Necaxa, Clave, Glorieta Violeta, París, La Diana, Antropología

Mexico City Light Rail: Las Torres, Xotepingo, Tepepan, Francisco Goitia
Hoy No Circula: Obligatory for all vehicles.
Mail

On March 31, Mexico's post suspended international mail service outside the United States and Canada due to cancellation of international passenger airline flights. On September 24, Mexico's post stated that it was able to dispatch mail to a growing number of destinations as flights return to normal, albeit with reduced capacity.

== Misinformation and criticism ==
Mexico's federal government was perceived as slow to respond to the COVID-19 pandemic as of late March 2020, and it was met with criticism from certain sectors of society and the media. Through April 1, the government only performed 10,000 tests, compared to 200,000 that had been completed in New York state. Therefore, official statistics are likely to greatly underestimate the actual number of cases. The New York Times reported on May 8, 2020, that the federal government is underreporting deaths in Mexico City; the federal government reports 700 deaths in the city while local officials have detected over 2,500.

President Andrés Manuel López Obrador continued to hold rallies, be hands-on with crowds, and downplay the threat of coronavirus to health and the economy.

Miguel Barbosa Huerta, the governor of Puebla, claimed that only the wealthy were at risk of COVID-19, since the poor are immune. There is no evidence that wealth affects a person's vulnerability to the virus.

Rumors about a curfew sparked the barricading of streets in San Felipe del Progreso, State of Mexico, on May 8, 2020. A rumor spread via WhatsApp that authorities were spreading gas contaminated with COVID-19 provoked vandalism of police cars in San Mateo Capulhuac, Otzolotepec, on May 9.

Studies on the media framing of COVID-19 in Mexico claim newscasts and newspapers focused on the political side of the pandemic rather than on providing scientific and self-efficacy information. Researchers also demonstrated that the United States and Mexico failed to test, treat, and/or vaccinate deportees on either side of the border, leading to undiagnosed illness among migrants who were formerly held in crowded detention facilities as well as the sustained cross-border spread of SARS-CoV-2.

== Transition to endemic stage ==
On April 26, 2022, President Obrador said that COVID-19 was "retreating almost completely" and that COVID-19 has moved on from a pandemic to an endemic stage.

== See also ==
- COVID-19 pandemic in North America
- COVID-19 pandemic by country
- 2020 in Mexico
- 2020s
- Fourth Transformation
- History of smallpox in Mexico
- Cocoliztli epidemics
- 1918 Spanish flu pandemic
- 2009 swine flu pandemic in Mexico
- HIV/AIDS in Latin America
- Dengue fever outbreaks
- 2014 chikungunya outbreak in Mexico
- 2015–2016 Zika virus epidemic
- Vaccination in Mexico
