= Vaccination in Mexico =

Vaccination in Mexico includes the use of vaccines in advancing public health. Mexico has a multi-year program for immunization of children. The immunization of children is fully covered by the government of Mexico. Mexico has an adverse events committee to monitor the adverse effects of vaccination as well as a standing technical advisory group on immunization.

== COVID-19 vaccination ==
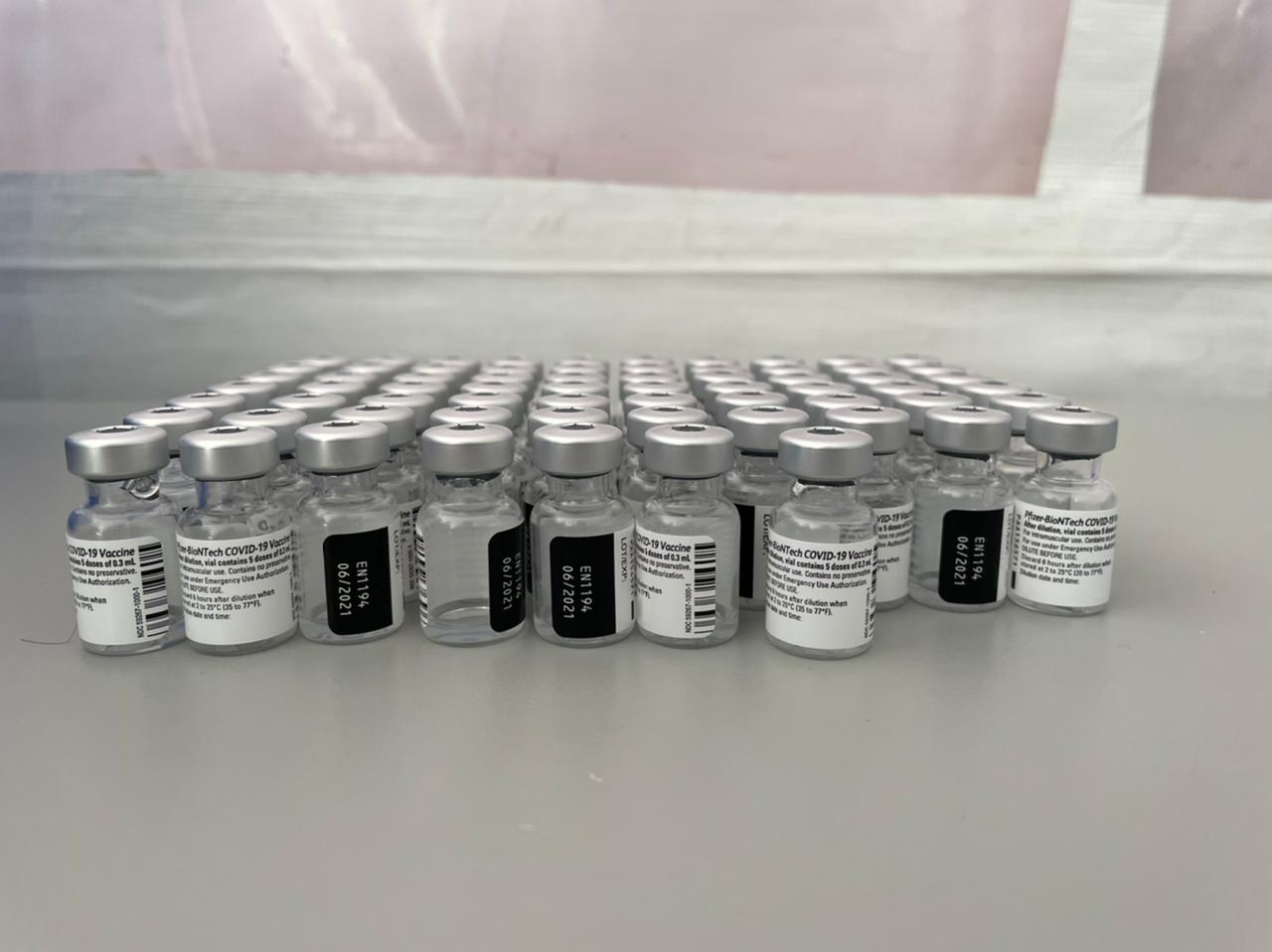
COVID-19 vaccine vials being made ready for delivery at a vaccination center in Mexico

In Mexico, 4% of individuals received at least one dose of the COVID-19 vaccine as of March 2021. Wealthy Mexicans were reported to travel to the neighboring United States for receiving their vaccinations. In March, the White House announced that four million doses of COVID-19 vaccines manufactured in the United States will be sent to Mexico.

In a survey conducted in March 2021, 52% of Mexicans said that they were willing to get vaccinated against COVID-19, 20% said they were not sure and 28% said they would not get vaccinated. As of early October, children's COVID-19 vaccination programs began, but only for those with medical conditions, yet when asked in an open survey, parents were highly interested in having their children vaccinated. Nonetheless, parents did express levels of concern involving their children developing adverse effects from the vaccine.

On April 20, 2021, President López Obrador televised himself receiving the AstraZeneca vaccine.

=== National vaccination plan ===
The national vaccination plan against COVID-19 has been planned as below in Mexico:

- December 2020 – February 2021: Health workers dealing with COVID
- February – April 2021: Other health workers and people 60+ years of age
- April – May 2021: People 50–59 years old
- May – June 2021: People 40–49 years old
- June 2021 – March 2022: People 19–39 years old (children under 18 are exempted from vaccination)

=== Authorized vaccines ===
The following vaccines are authorized by the Mexican government for use against COVID-19 (approval date in parentheses):

- BNT162b2 by Pfizer Inc./BioNTech (December 11, 2020)
- AZD1222 by AstraZeneca/Oxford University (January 4, 2021)
- Sputnik V by the Gamaleya Institute (February 2, 2021)
- Ad5-nCoV by CanSino Biologics Inc. (February 9, 2021)
- CoronaVac by Sinovac Research and Development Co. (February 9, 2021)
- Covaxin by Bharat Biotech/Indian Council of Medical Research (April 6, 2021)

== Routine vaccines ==
The recommended vaccine schedule for children in Mexico contains vaccinations against sixteen vaccine preventable diseases. Vaccine doses administered in Mexico are usually valid in the United States. The immunization schedule for children in Mexico is as follows:

Vaccines
Name	Age of administration	Diseases prevented
BCG	at birth	Tuberculosis
Antihepatitis B	at birth, 2, 6 months	Hepatitis B
Rotarix	2, 4 months	Rotavirus
Pneumococcal vaccine	2, 4 months, 12 through 15 months	Pneumococcal pneumonia
Antihepatitis A	12, 18 months	Hepatitis A
Pentavalent vaccine	2, 4, 6, 18 months	Haemophilus influenzae type B, Pertussis, Diphtheria, Tetanus, Polio
Varicella vaccine	12 months	Chicken pox
MMR vaccine	12 months, 18 months through 6 years	Measles, Mumps, Rubella
Influenza vaccine	6 through 59 months, 36 months through 9 years (high risk only)	Influenza
Human papillomavirus vaccine	11 through 12 years (3 doses, girls only)	Human Papillomavirus
DPT	4 through 6 years	Diphtheria, Pertussis, Tetanus
MR vaccine	from 10 years of age	Measles, Rubella
Sabin vaccine	2 doses per years, from 6 to 59 months of age in addition to prior 2 doses of IPV	Polio
Td	from 10 years of age	Tetanus

In addition, Vitamin A supplements are offered to all children aged 6 to 59 months.

== Vaccine coverage ==
The vaccine coverage of various vaccines in Mexico are as follows, according to the most recent survey conducted by the World Health Organization in 2014:

Vaccine coverage
Vaccine	Coverage
BCG	93%
DTP dose 1	92%
DTP dose 3	72%
Hepatitis B dose 3	82%
Hib dose 3	72%
Pneumococcal vaccine dose 3	57%
Rotavirus vaccine	63%

According to the statistics from the World Health Organization (WHO), no cases of diphtheria, measles, polio or yellow fever were reported in Mexico in 2019. However, mumps and pertussis cases are on the rise in Mexico, with 8009 and 874 children reportedly having contracted mumps and pertussis respectively in 2020. There was an increase in tetanus cases from a total of 23 in 2018 to 35 in 2019.
