= Allende metro station =

Mexico City metro station

Allende
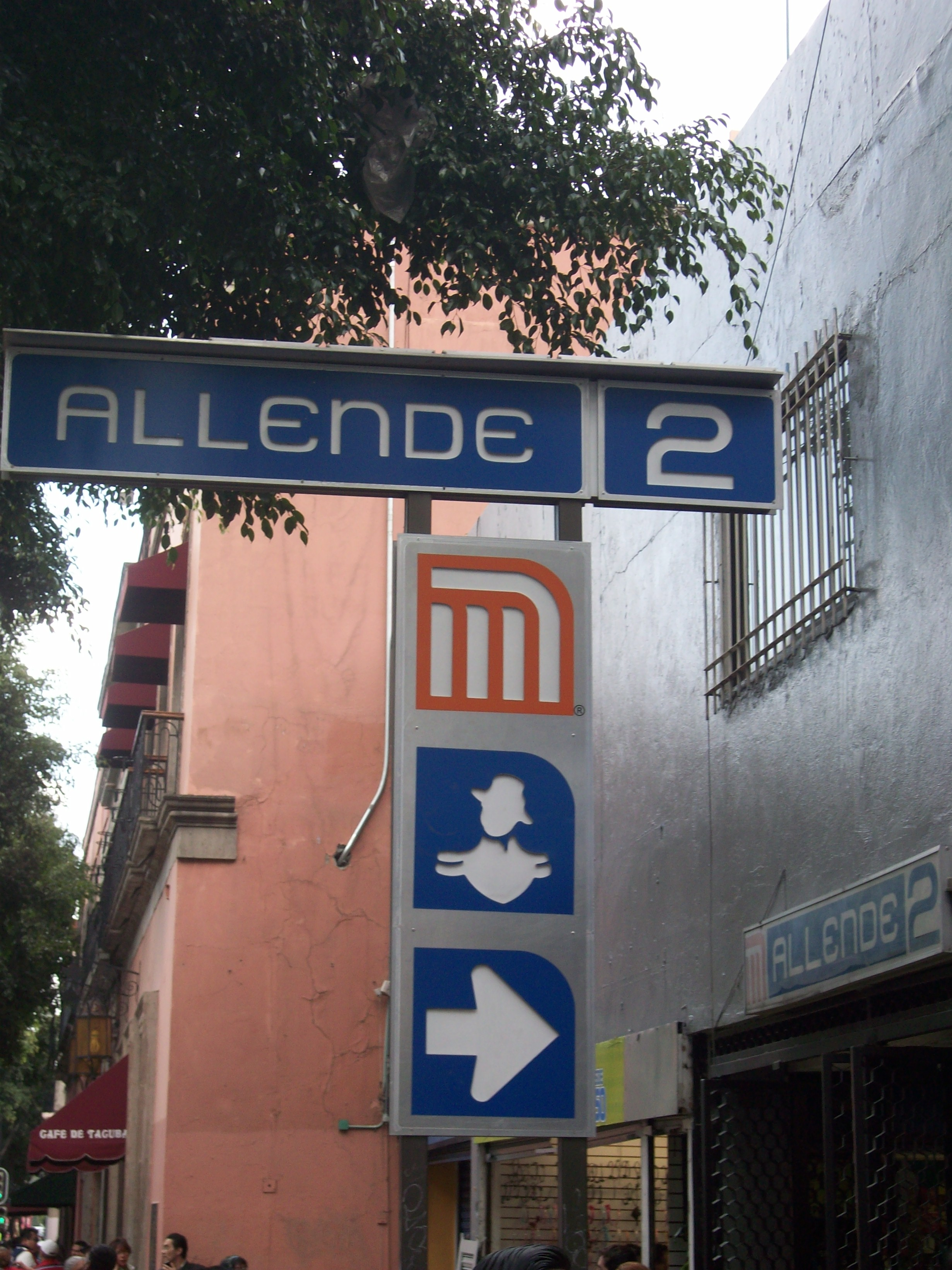
- Entrance to Metro Allende

General information
- Location: Tacuba street Centro, Cuauhtémoc; Mexico City; Mexico
- Coordinates: 19°26′08″N 99°08′15″W
- System: Mexico City Metro
- Operator: Sistema de Transporte Colectivo (STC)
- Platforms: 2 side platforms
- Tracks: 2

Construction
- Structure type: Underground
- Platform levels: 1
- Parking: No
- Cycle facilities: No

Other information
- Status: In service

History
- Opened: 14 September 1970; 55 years ago

Passengers
- 2025: 9,738,543 (Note: The data here is limited to the most recent ten years to avoid excessive listings; earlier figures can be found in this page's history or on the Mexico City Metro website. To calculate the average daily ridership, the annual total is divided by 365 days (366 in leap years), with decimals omitted from the result. Each station per line is ranked individually, as the system counts transfer stations separately. The percentage change is calculated automatically using the data from the current year and the previous year.) ▲3.03%
- Rank: 32/195

Services
Preceding station	Mexico City Metro	Following station
Bellas Artes toward Cuatro Caminos	Line 2	Zócalo toward Tasqueña
Route map
Location
- Location within Mexico City
- Area map

Allende is a station on Line 2 of the Mexico City Metro system. It is located in the Colonia Centro district of the Cuauhtémoc municipality of Mexico City, on Tacuba street west of the main square in downtown. In 2019 the station had an average ridership of 28,873 passengers per day.

== Name and pictogram ==
The station is named in honor of general Ignacio Allende, one of the principal instigators of the Mexican War of Independence of 1810. This is because the station is located near the intersection of the Tacuba and Allende streets. The station's pictogram depicts the bust of Allende.

== General information ==
The station opened on 14 September 1970 as part of the second stretch of Line 2, from Pino Suárez to Tacuba.

The station has the peculiar feature that its platforms are not directly connected underground as it is the case with most stations in the system. In order to change platforms at Allende one has to exit the station and cross the street, thus making it necessary to pay the fare again, a feature only shared with Metro Tezozómoc in Line 6.

From 23 April to 24 June 2020, the station was temporarily closed due to the COVID-19 pandemic in Mexico.

=== Ridership ===
Annual passenger ridership
Year	Ridership	Average daily	Rank	% change	Ref.
2025	9,738,543	26,680	32/195	+3.03%
2024	9,452,158	25,825	30/195	+20.59%
2023	7,838,402	21,475	44/195	+27.11%
2022	6,166,534	16,894	59/195	+45.09%
2021	4,250,192	11,644	72/195	+4.99%
2020	4,048,169	11,060	90/195	−61.59%
2019	10,538,474	28,872	46/195	−0.64%
2018	10,605,916	29,057	47/195	−2.88%
2017	10,920,111	29,918	42/195	−4.42%
2016	11,425,327	31,216	40/195	−3.25%

== Nearby ==
- Teatro de la Ciudad, theater.
- House of the Legislative Assembly of the Federal District
- Museo Nacional de Arte, national art museum.
- Palacio de Minería, museum of the Faculty of Engineering of UNAM.

== Exits ==
- Northeast: Tacuba street, Centro
- Northwest: Tacuba street, Centro
- Southeast: Tacuba street and Motolinia street, Centro
- Southwest: Tacuba street, Centro

== Gallery ==
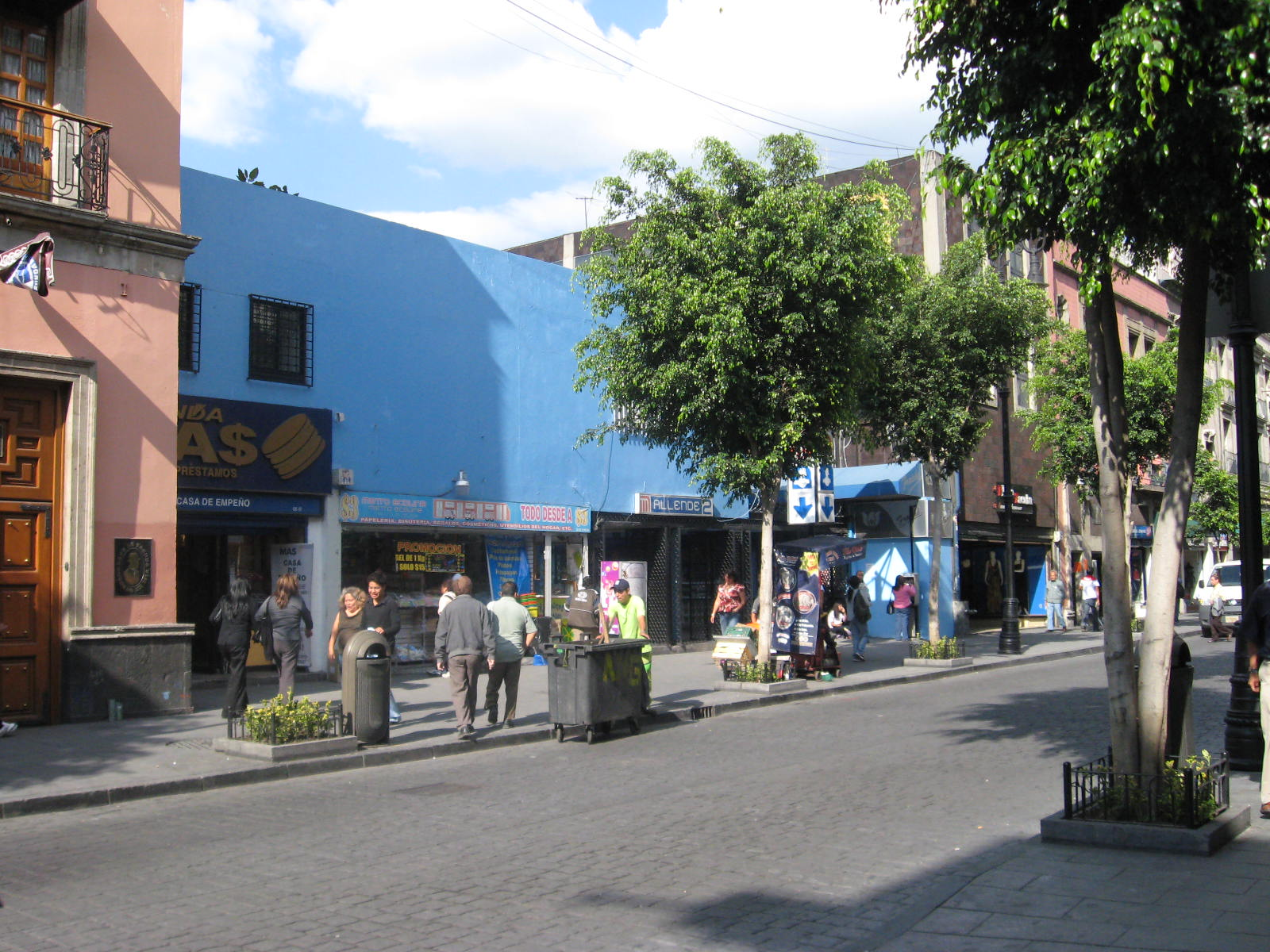
Entrance to the station on Tacuba street

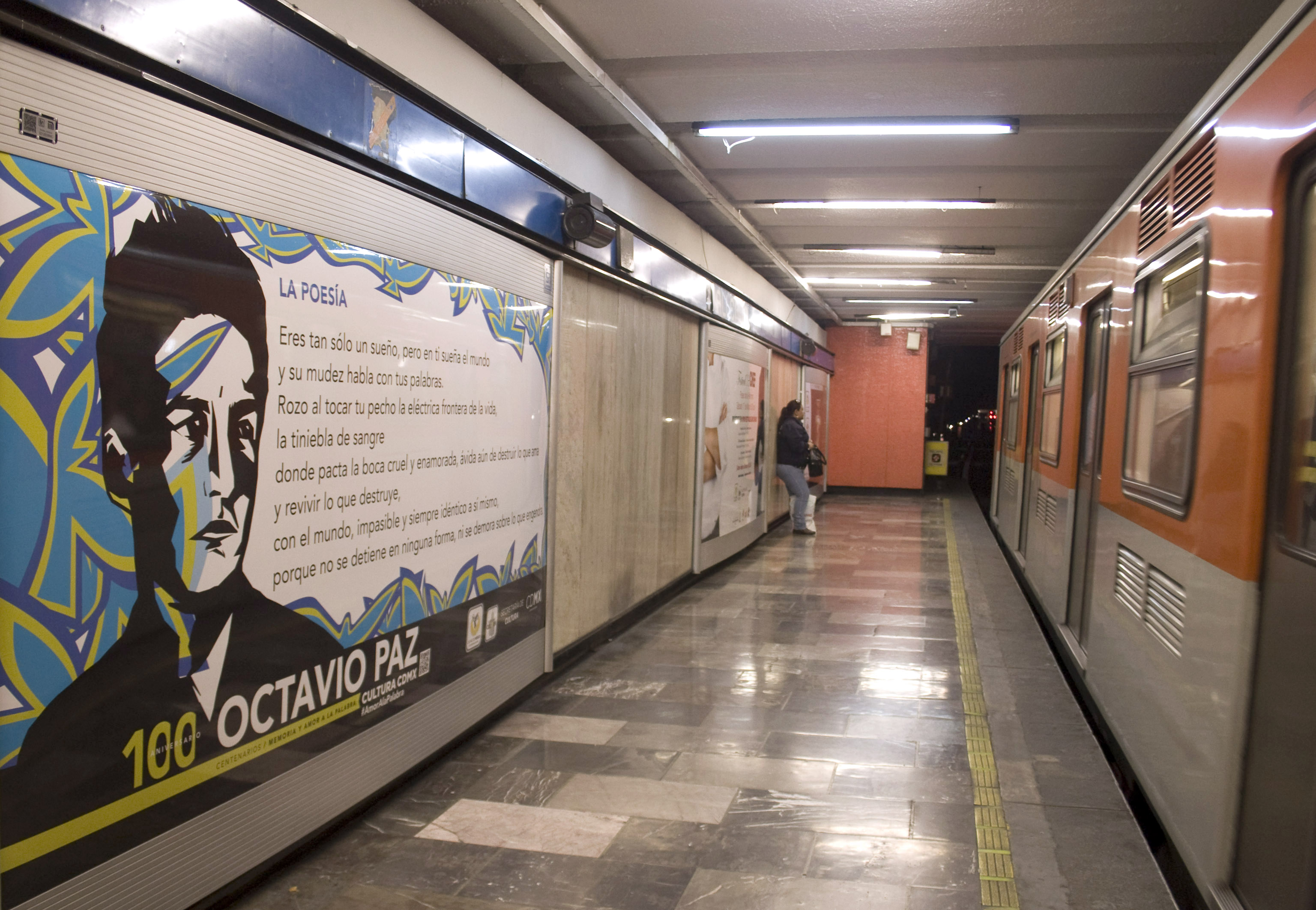
An NM-02 at the station

== See also ==
- List of Mexico City metro stations
