= San Cosme metro station =

Mexico City metro station

San Cosme
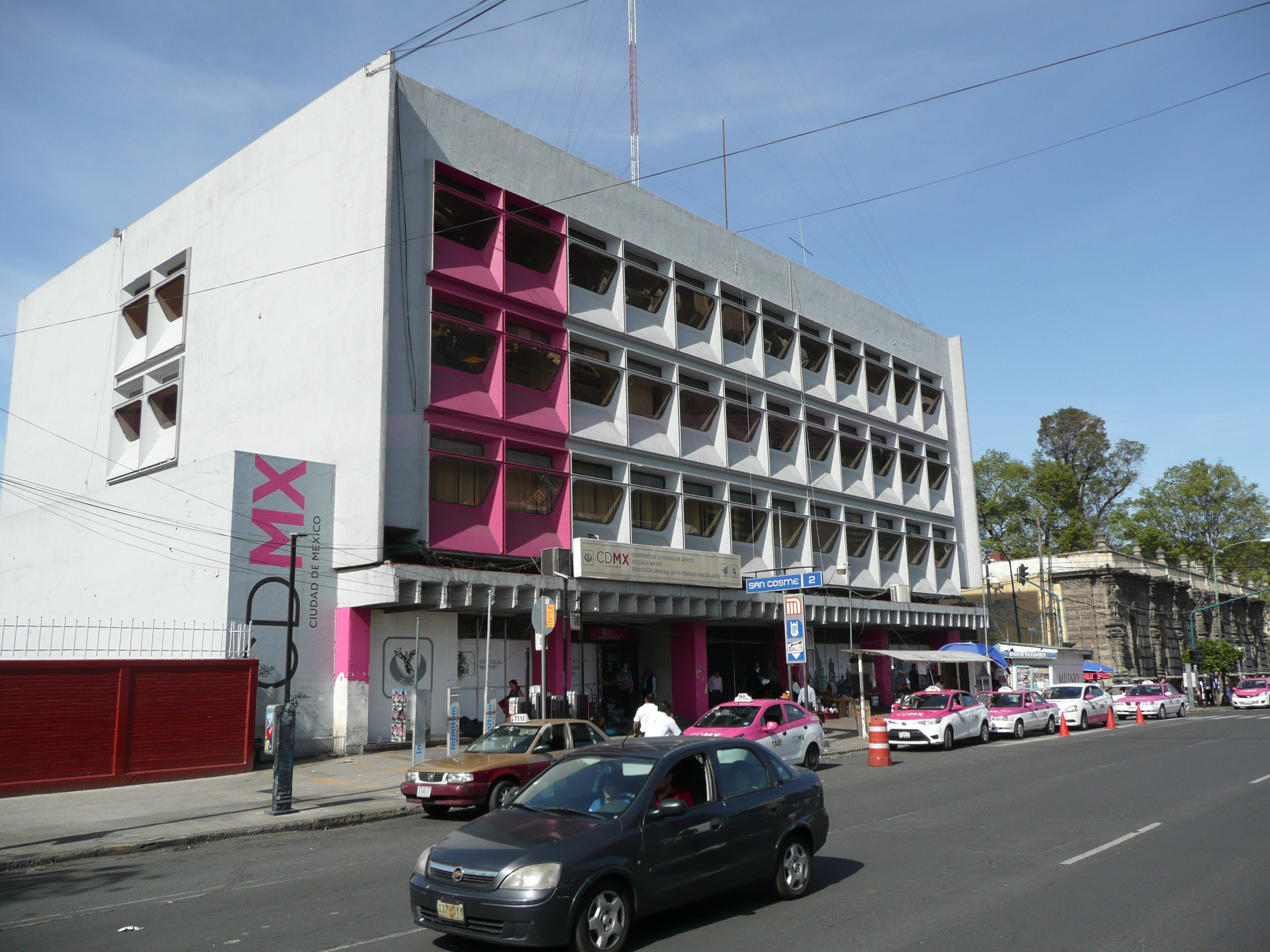
- Entrance

General information
- Location: Avenida Ribera de San Cosme; Miguel Hidalgo; Mexico City; Mexico
- Coordinates: 19°26′30″N 99°09′40″W
- System: Mexico City Metro
- Platforms: 2 side platforms
- Tracks: 2

Construction
- Structure type: Underground

History
- Opened: 14 September 1970; 55 years ago

Passengers
- 2025: 6,458,313 (Note: The data here is limited to the most recent ten years to avoid excessive listings; earlier figures can be found in this page's history or on the Mexico City Metro website. To calculate the average daily ridership, the annual total is divided by 365 days (366 in leap years), with decimals omitted from the result. Each station per line is ranked individually, as the system counts transfer stations separately. The percentage change is calculated automatically using the data from the current year and the previous year.) ▲1.33%
- Rank: 67/195

Services
Preceding station	Mexico City Metro	Following station
Normal toward Cuatro Caminos	Line 2	Revolución toward Tasqueña
Route map
Location
- Location within Mexico City
- Area map

San Cosme is a station on Line 2 of the Mexico City Metro system. It is located in the Cuauhtémoc municipality of Mexico City, northwest of the city centre, on Avenue Ribera de San Cosme a few blocks before it becomes Calzada México-Tacuba. The southern exit leads to Colonia San Rafael while the Northern one leads to Colonia Santa María la Ribera. It is two blocks from the Mercado de San Cosme. In 2019, the station had an average ridership of 22,891 passengers per day.

== Name and pictogram ==
The station name comes from the Ribera de San Cosme avenue, on which the station is located. The former name of the road was Calzada de San Cosme and a stream used to run along the way before the desiccation of Lake Texcoco, hence the name "ribera".

The station pictogram depicts a balcony from the nearby colonial building known as La Casa de los Mascarones that currently houses the National Autonomous University of Mexico Foreign Languages School.

== General information ==
The station was opened on 14 September 1970 as part of the second stretch of Line 2, from Pino Suárez to Tacuba.

The station serves the Colonia San Rafael and Colonia Santa María la Ribera neighborhoods.

=== Ridership ===
Annual passenger ridership
Year	Ridership	Average daily	Rank	% change	Ref.
2025	6,657,306	18,239	63/195	+1.33%
2024	6,569,630	17,949	63/195	+1.72%
2023	6,458,313	17,694	67/195	+13.21%
2022	5,704,555	15,628	70/195	+67.42%
2021	3,407,301	9,335	92/195	−21.03%
2020	4,314,737	11,788	82/195	−48.36%
2019	8,355,454	22,891	66/195	+1.14%
2018	8,261,419	22,634	72/195	−4.99%
2017	8,694,990	23,821	62/195	−7.68%
2016	9,417,922	25,732	55/195	−10.08%

== Exits ==
- North: Avenida Ribera de San Cosme and Rosas Moreno street, Colonia San Rafael
- South: Avenida Ribera de San Cosme and Naranjo street, Colonia Santa María la Ribera

== Gallery ==
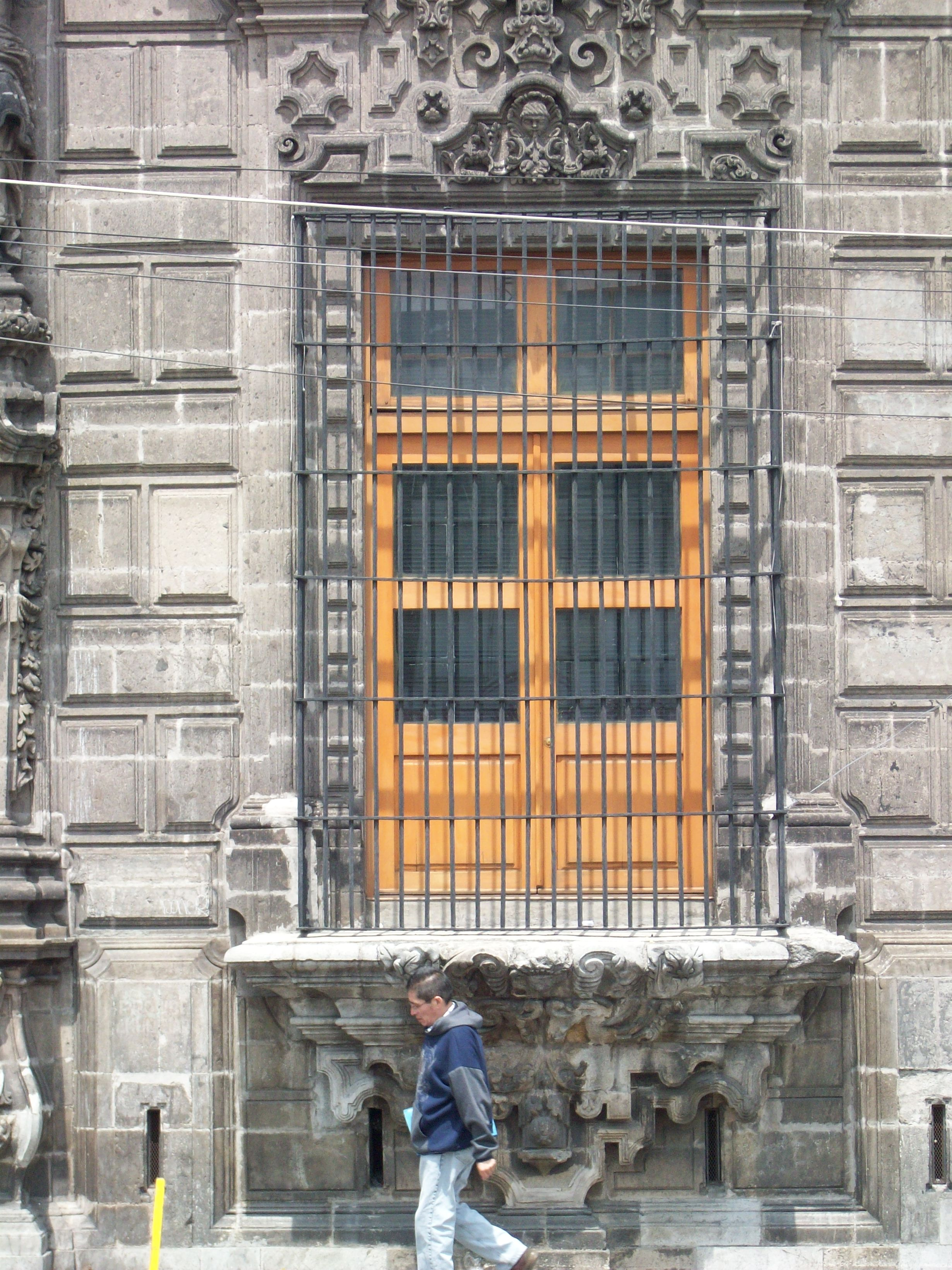
Detail of the Casa de los Mascarones balcony

== See also ==
- List of Mexico City metro stations
