= Popotla metro station =

Mexico City metro station

Popotla
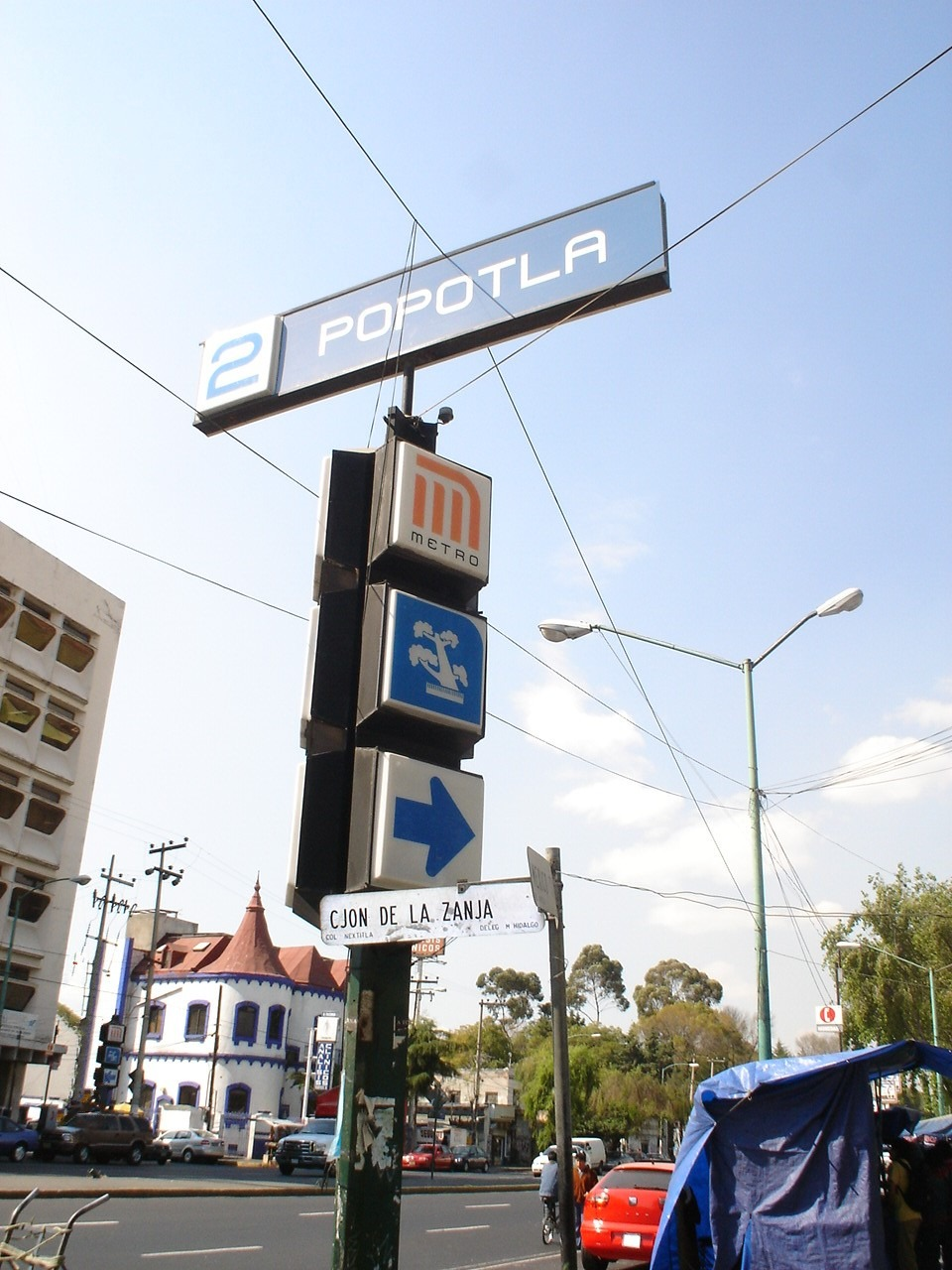
- Station entrance sign, 22 December 2006

General information
- Location: Calzada México-Tacuba; Popotla, Miguel Hidalgo; Mexico City; Mexico
- Coordinates: 19°27′08″N 99°10′29″W
- System: Mexico City Metro
- Operator: Sistema de Transporte Colectivo (STC)
- Platforms: 2 side platform
- Tracks: 2

Construction
- Structure type: Underground

Other information
- Status: In service

History
- Opened: 14 September 1970; 56 years ago

Passengers
- 2025: 2,908,368 (Note: The data here is limited to the most recent ten years to avoid excessive listings; earlier figures can be found in this page's history or on the Mexico City Metro website. To calculate the average daily ridership, the annual total is divided by 365 days (366 in leap years), with decimals omitted from the result. Each station per line is ranked individually, as the system counts transfer stations separately. The percentage change is calculated automatically using the data from the current year and the previous year.) ▼1.66%
- Rank: 152/195

Services
Preceding station	Mexico City Metro	Following station
Cuitláhuac toward Cuatro Caminos	Line 2	Colegio Militar toward Tasqueña
Route map
Location
- Location within Mexico City
- Area map

Popotla is a station on Line 2 of the Mexico City Metro system. It is located in the Colonia Popotla neighborhood of the Miguel Hidalgo borough of Mexico City, northwest of the city center, on the Calzada México-Tacuba. In 2019 the station had an average ridership of 10,000 passengers per day, making it the least used station on Line 2.

== Name and pictogram ==
The name of the station comes from the neighborhood it serves: Popotla. The logo depicts an ahuehuete tree, referring to the Árbol de la Noche Triste – the "tree of the sad night" – where Spanish conquistador Hernán Cortés stopped his retreat from Tenochtitlán and cried after being defeated by Cuitláhuac in the Battle of Noche Triste. The actual tree survived until the 20th century, when it was destroyed by a fire. There is a commemorative plaque on the site where the tree used to be.

== General information ==
The station was opened on 14 September 1970 as part of the second stretch of Line 2, from Pino Suárez to Tacuba. Metro Popotla serves the neighborhood of the same name.

From 23 April to 24 June 2020, the station was temporarily closed due to the COVID-19 pandemic in Mexico.

=== Ridership ===
Annual passenger ridership
Year	Ridership	Average daily	Rank	% change	Ref.
2025	2,908,368	7,968	152/195	−1.66%
2024	2,957,321	8,080	144/195	+5.46%
2023	2,804,236	7,682	136/195	+12.85%
2022	2,484,958	6,808	140/195	+78.75%
2021	1,390,202	3,808	159/195	−3.38%
2020	1,438,795	3,931	172/195	−60.58%
2019	3,650,212	10,000	154/195	−0.80%
2018	3,679,693	10,081	153/195	+0.20%
2017	3,672,167	10,060	150/195	−2.49%
2016	3,766,005	10,289	147/195	−2.36%

== Nearby ==
- Universidad del Ejército y Fuerza Aérea, university of the Mexican Army and the Air Force

== Entrances ==
- North: Calzada México-Tacuba and Callejón de la Zanja, Popotla
- North: Calzada México-Tacuba and Colegio Militar street, Popotla

== See also ==
- List of Mexico City metro stations
