= Xola =

Xola may refer to:

== People ==
- Xola Malik, an American rapper known by his stage name "Kid Sensation"
- Xola Nqola, a South African politician from East Cape
- Xola Petse, a South African judge

== Places ==
- Xola metro station, a metro station in Mexico City
