= Tacuba (disambiguation) =

Tacuba is a municipality of El Salvador.

Tacuba may also refer to:

- Tacuba, Mexico City, a district in Mexico City, formerly a separate municipality
  - Metro Tacuba, a station of the Mexico City Metro
- Tlacopan or Tacuba, a pre-Columbian polity

== See also ==
- Café Tacuba, a musical group from Naucalpan, Mexico
