= Normal metro station =

Mexico City metro station

Normal
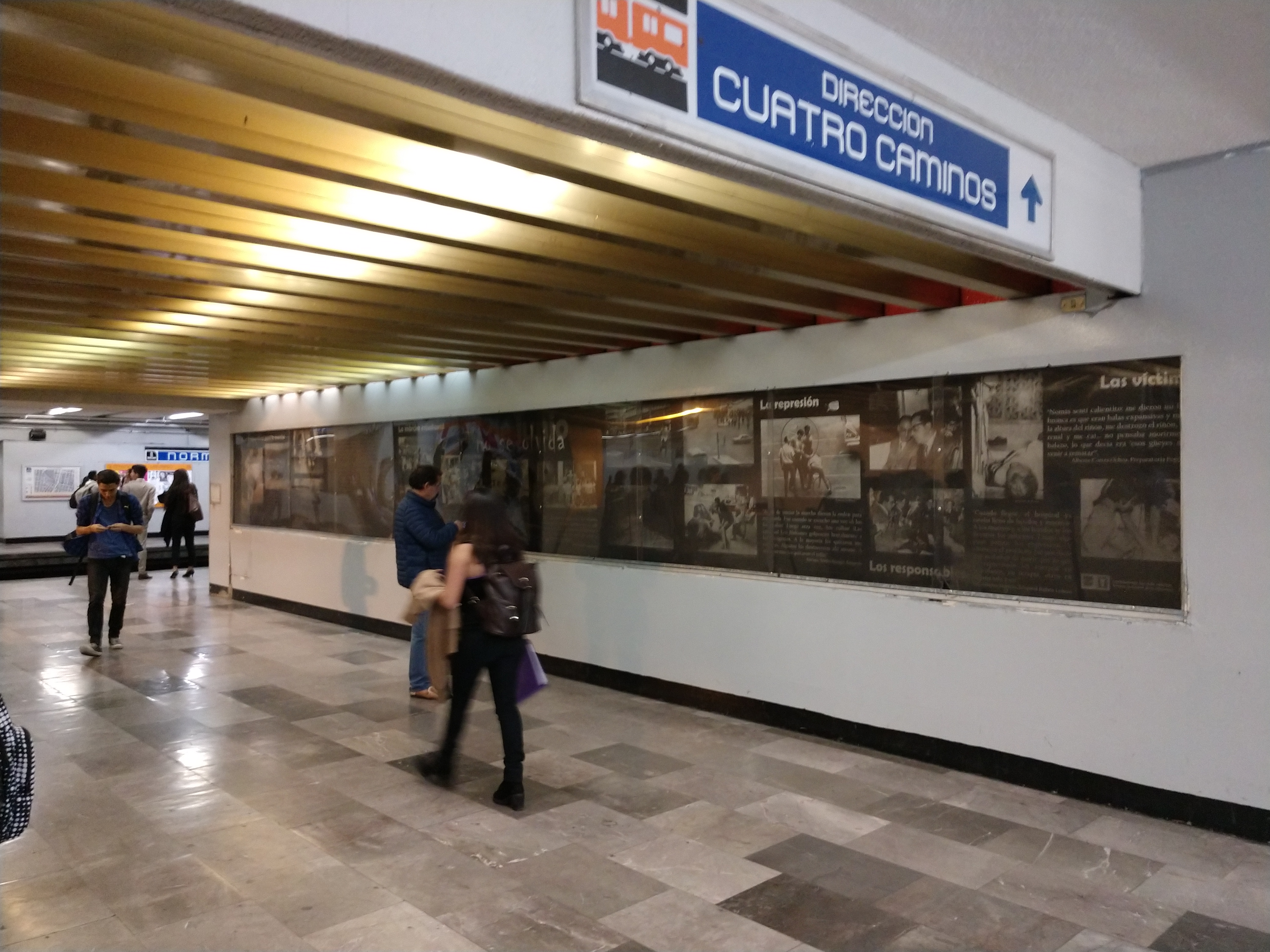
- Station in 2018

General information
- Location: Calzada México-Tacuba; Miguel Hidalgo; Mexico City; Mexico
- Coordinates: 19°26′40″N 99°10′03″W
- System: Mexico City Metro
- Platforms: 2 side platforms
- Tracks: 2

Construction
- Structure type: Underground

History
- Opened: 14 September 1970; 55 years ago

Passengers
- 2025: 10,176,323 (Note: The data here is limited to the most recent ten years to avoid excessive listings; earlier figures can be found in this page's history or on the Mexico City Metro website. To calculate the average daily ridership, the annual total is divided by 365 days (366 in leap years), with decimals omitted from the result. Each station per line is ranked individually, as the system counts transfer stations separately. The percentage change is calculated automatically using the data from the current year and the previous year.) ▼4.37%
- Rank: 28/195

Services
Preceding station	Mexico City Metro	Following station
Colegio Militar toward Cuatro Caminos	Line 2	San Cosme toward Tasqueña
Route map
Location
- Location within Mexico City
- Area map

Normal is a station on Line 2 of the Mexico City Metro system. It is located in the Miguel Hidalgo municipality of Mexico City, northwest of the city centre, near the Calzada México-Tacuba. In 2019, the station had an average ridership of 35,260 passengers per day.

== Name and pictogram ==
The station name refers to the nearby Escuela Normal de Maestros, an academy for elementary school teachers, often referred to simply as Normal, hence the station designation as Normal. The station pictogram depicts a stylized design of the tower of the Normal main building inaugurated in 1947 by Jaime Torres Bodet, then Minister of Education of Mexico.

== History ==
The station opened on 14 September 1970 as part of the second stretch of Line 2, from Pino Suárez to Tacuba.

=== Corpus Christi Massacre ===
On 10 June 1971, riot police clashed with students who were protesting against the Mexican government in the vicinity of the metro station. Nearly 120 protesters were killed, among them a fourteen-year-old boy. The massacre was depicted in the 2018 Academy Award-winning film Roma.

The station has pictures and testimonies about the massacre on the walls, as well as a memorial plaque unveiled in 2001 by Mexico City's government.

== General information ==
The station is located on the Calzada México-Tacuba and serves the following neighborhoods: Colonia Tlaxpana, Colonia Un Hogar para Nosotros and Colonia Agricultura. In 2019, it was the fourth busiest station in Line 2.

=== Ridership ===
Annual passenger ridership
Year	Ridership	Average daily	Rank	% change	Ref.
2025	10,176,323	27,880	28/195	−4.37%
2024	10,640,982	29,073	25/195	−0.17%
2023	10,659,125	29,203	19/195	+19.39%
2022	8,928,050	24,460	25/195	+71.33%
2021	5,211,134	14,277	48/195	−19.43%
2020	6,467,961	17,672	37/195	−49.74%
2019	12,870,083	35,260	26/195	−0.19%
2018	12,895,151	35,329	26/195	−0.46%
2017	12,954,200	35,490	26/195	−3.28%
2016	13,393,733	36,594	26/195	−2.13%

== Entrances ==
- Northeast: Calzada México-Tacuba and Avenida de los Maestros, Colonia Tlaxpana
- Northwest: Calzada México-Tacuba and Avenida de los Maestros, Colonia Tlaxpana
- South: Calzada México-Tacuba and Tláloc street, Colonia Un Hogar para Nosotros.

== Gallery ==
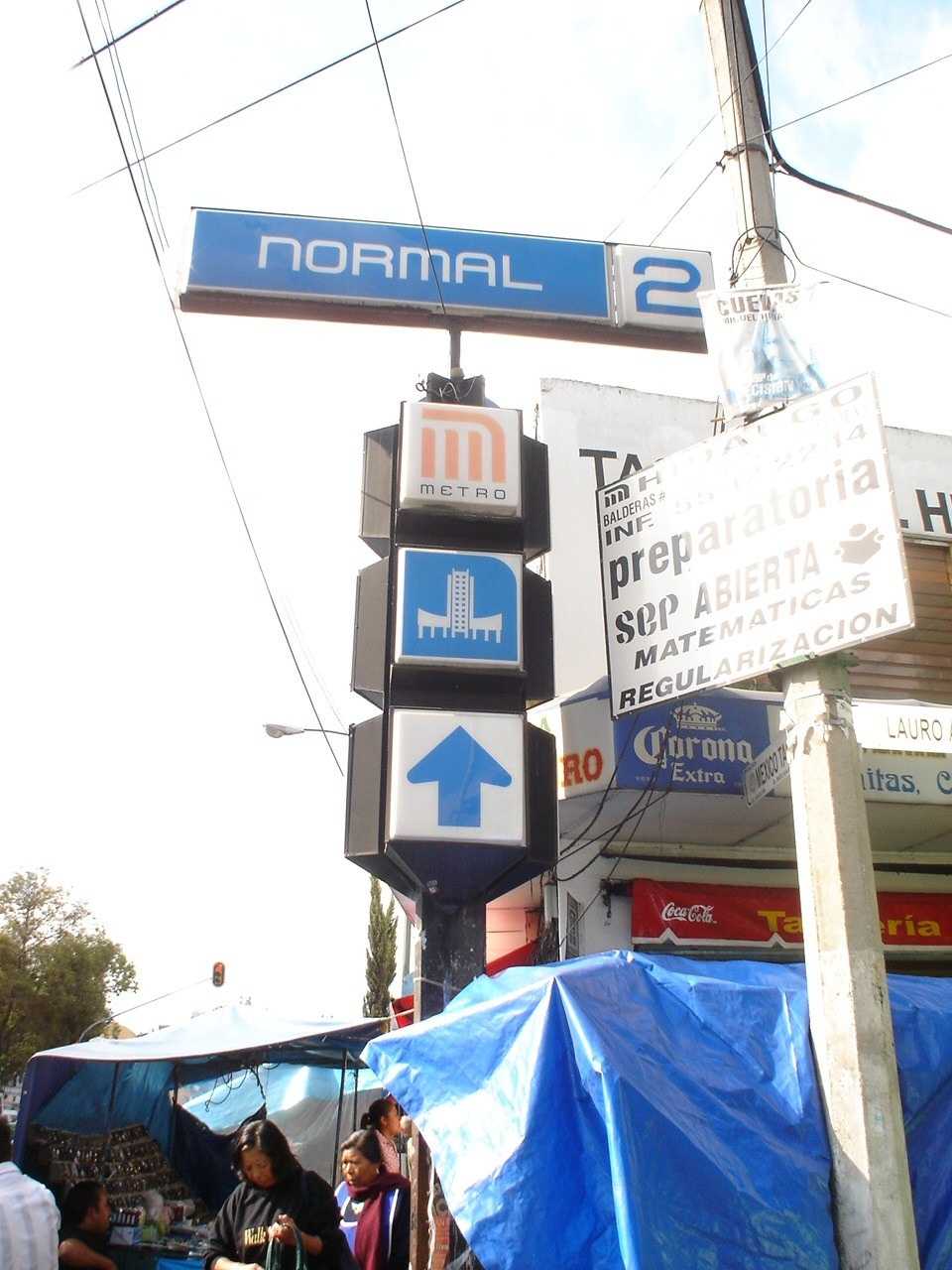
Entry sign

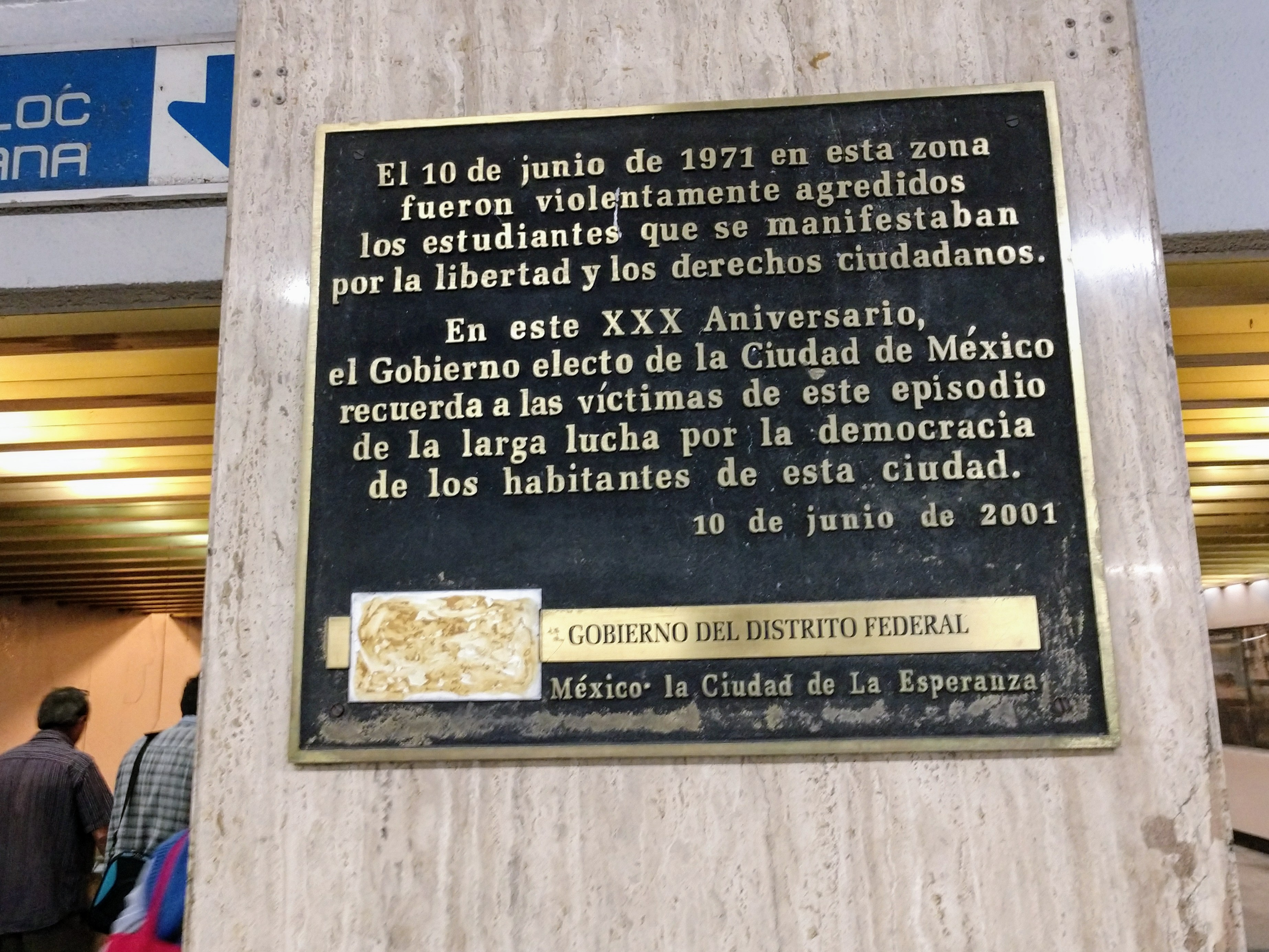
Memorial plaque inside the station

== See also ==
- List of Mexico City metro stations
- Corpus Christi massacre
