= MP-68 =

Mexico City Metro train

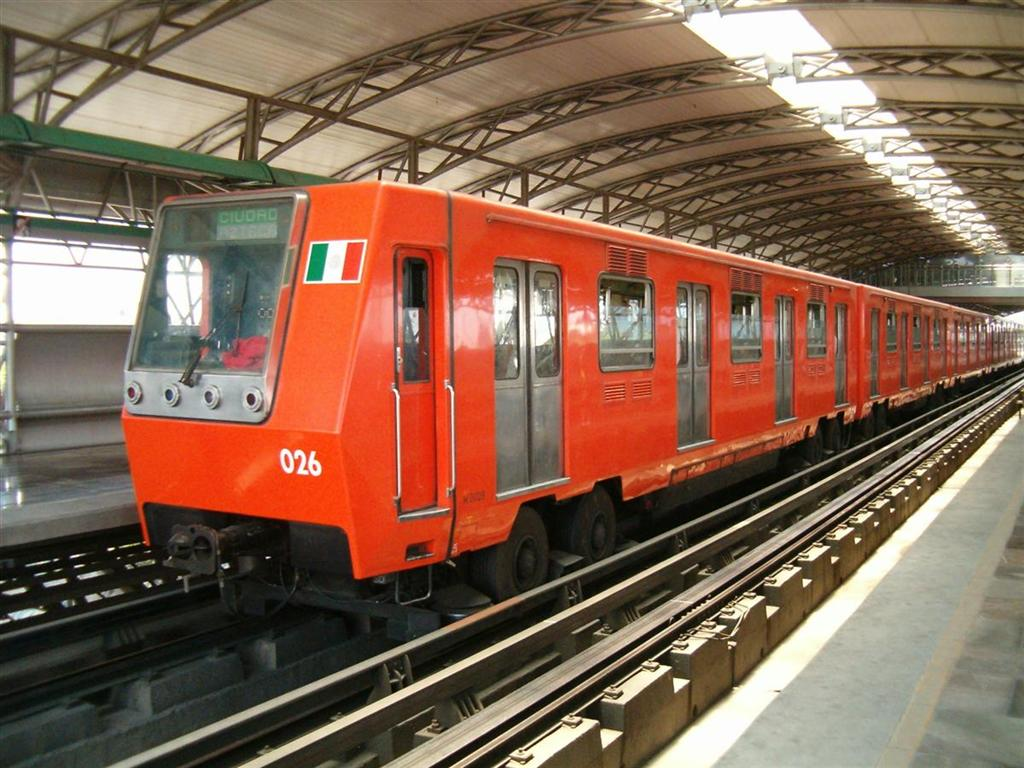
- A model MP-68 train, restored in 1994 by Bombardier Transportation México.
- Stock type: Electric rubber-tyred multiple unit
- Manufacturer: Alstom
- Constructed: 1968-1970
- Number built: 60 (540 units)
- Capacity: 1471

Specifications
- Train length: 150 m (490 ft)
- Width: 2,500 mm (98 in)
- Height: 1,140 mm (45 in) (floor); 3,840 mm (151 in) (vehicular)
- Maximum speed: 70 km/h (43 mph)
- Weight: 261 tonnes
- Power output: 4065 kW
- Safety system: Alarm levers
- Track gauge: 1,435 mm (4 ft 8 1/2 in)

Notes/references
- Composition: Six Cars: M-R-N-N-PR-M; Nine Cars: M-R-N-N-PR-N-N-R-M

The MP-68 (French: Matériel roulant sur Pneumatiques 1968) is the first rubber-tyred train model of the Mexico City Metro. It was designed and built by Alstom in France. In total, 60 trains were built (with 9 units each), of which 26 (234 units) correspond to the restoration carried out in 1993. They run on lines 5 and B of the Mexico City Metro.

It is the fourth Rubber-tyred train model manufactured in series in France. Its successive restorations, carried out between 1995 and 1998, have allowed it to remain in service for more than 50 years in the Mexico City Metro. Being a reliable model, the engineering has served as a basis for other rubber-tyred trains, both for Alstom and for other train manufacturers for Mexico.

== History ==
With the growth of Mexico City, it became necessary to provide a mass transit system. After analyzing alternatives, the french company Alsthom was contracted to build these trains.

A system of rubber-tyred trains was chosen to be used, which provide a smooth ride with low noise levels. MP 59 trains were chosen as the base of the model to operate in Mexico City. The first group of these trains was manufactured in the workshops of Fontenay, while the second order was manufactured in the facilities of La Rochelle.

Initially they operated with 6 cars, but due to the increasing population density of Mexico City, it was feared that with these short trains, the system could become saturated in a short time, so 3 more cars were added, giving the current length of 150 m.

Two of these trains suffered an accident at the Viaducto station on Line 2, on 20 October 1975. After such an accident, an automatic piloting system was installed on all trains, which is located in the fifth car, and any new trains incorporated into the system were also equipped with this type of system.

They have been used for a long time on several parts of the current metro network, from Line 1, operating for a time on Line 6 and Line 9, as well as Line 7 after the reassignment of the rolling stock of Line 2 when it expanded to Cuatro Caminos, as well as those operating today on lines 5 and B. Even after 52 years of service, they have shown that they can still handle the passenger load that this transport receives every day.

The trains have an excellent reputation among mexican metro operators due to the quality manufacturing reinforced with the restorations.

=== Rehabilitation ===
In 1994, the trains of this model had travelled 5 million km in total, so at the beginning of 1995 it was decided to carry out a progressive restoration of the entire MP-68 series vehicle fleet. The renovation program ended in 2000.

The renovation was carried out by the company Bombardier-Concarril (Bombardier Transportation México today) to extend the useful life by at least 30 more years, so the rehabilitation improved some aspects of the MP-68 model, such as:

==== Improvements from 1996 to 1998 (first trains renovated) ====
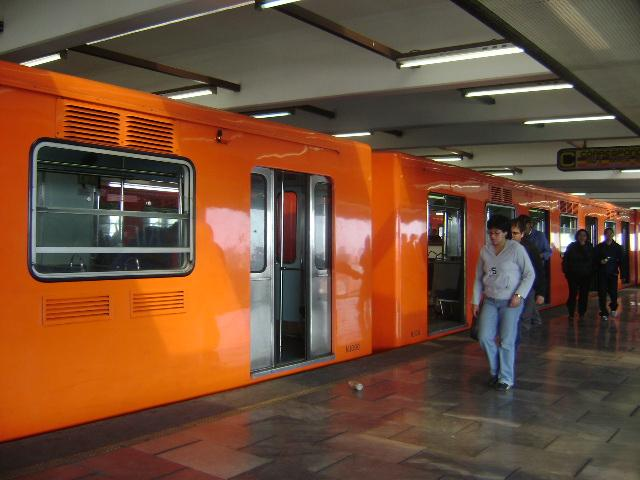
MP-68 train at Pantitlán station (Line 9).

- Addition of an airhorn with 2 "voices" to the sound warning mechanism.
- New door closing warning sound (matching that of french MP 89 trains)
- Installation of a ventilation system making use of motor fans
- New speaker panels provided by Eltec
- Renovation of the PA and SACEM systems
- Navy blue colored non-slip flooring
- Installation of electronic components of recent and current technology

==== Improvements from 1998 to 2000 (renovation of all trains) ====
- Addition of new white and red lanterns
- Addition of halogen headlights
- Addition of Nokia radiotelephones (only on Line B)
- Addition of digital numbers (with Arial font and micas fijas de dirección)
- Addition of station notices and ambient music
- Addition of intelligent speed controls via radio signal
- Non-slip linoleum floor with granulated surface

=== Present ===
The rehabilitated trains are in service, most of the refurbished MP-68s were supplied by Bombardier and distributed in two periods named R93 and R96, and a small number of the trains were rehabilitated by CAF following the scheme of the NE-92 model trains.

Currently the MP-68 trains in their rehabilitated variants are used throughout the fleet, serving lines 5 and B. A further upgrade of the tracking and braking systems, which date back to 1968, is planned, with the more recent systems similar to those of NM-02 trains. The company that won the bid for the second renovation was Alstom (2015).

== Characteristics ==
- Track gauge of safety wheels: 1,435 mm (4 ft 8 1/2 in).
- Track gauge of drive wheels: 1,993 mm (approx. 6 ft 6 3/4 in).
- Voltage: 750 VCC
- Traction system: Chopper IGBT. (before JH rheostatic system)
- Autopiloting system: SACEM special to line B. The system used for line 5 is PA135.
- Ventilation system: Air renovation, ventilation grilles and ceiling mounted cooling fans.
- Door Closing warning system: Vibrator with high-pitched tones and door pilot lights (with the rehabilitation, all models receive a monophonic tone similar to that of french MP89s and NS-93s at the Santiago metro).
- Next station announcement system: Automatic pre-recorded voice.
- Door Design:
- LED signs: White or orange signs.
- Manufacturer: Alstom. Rehabilitated by Bombardier Transportation México.
- Origin: France
- Motor Series: M-001 A M-120
- Interior: Navy blue seats and light blue interior finishes.
- Monocoup: Electric bell
- Bodywork paint: Orange
- Possible formations: 6 cars M-R-N-N-PR-M or 9 cars M-R-N-N-PR-N-N-R-M

== Lines ==
- Líne (1969-1982, CAF: 2000-2021)
- Líne (1970-1998)
- Líne (1970-1981, R93: 2016-2017)
- Líne (1981-1994)
- Líne (1981-1993, R93: 2008-present)
- Líne (1983-1999, R93: 2015-2017)
- Líne (1984-1999, R96B: 1997-2005, R93: 2007-2012)
- Líne (1987-1996, R93: 1995-2008)
- Líne (R96: Since 1999, R93: Since 2008)

== Rolling stock ==
The rolling stock is composed as follows:

Model	Motors	Composition	Line	Original Line	Comments
MP-68R96B	001/002		Mexico City Metro line 7	Mexico City Metro line B	Recreation of the presidential train
MP-68R93	003/063		Línea 5 del Metro de la Ciudad de México		
MP-68/NM-73B R96B	004/199		Mexico City Metro line B		The "rarito" of line B for being mixed with a NM-73
MP-68R93	005/070		Mexico City Metro line B	Mexico City Metro line 9	
MP-68R93	006/064		Mexico City Metro line 7	Mexico City Metro line 9 Mexico City Metro line 2	
MP-68R96	007/080		Mexico City Metro line B		
MP-68R96	008/047		Mexico City Metro line 5	Mexico City Metro line B	
	009/051		Mexico City Metro line 5	Mexico City Metro line B	CDMX Train
	010/040		Mexico City Metro line B		
MP-68R93	011/076		Mexico City Metro line 5		Decommissioned
MP-68R93	012/055		Mexico City Metro line 5		
	013/068		Mexico City Metro line B		
	014/077				
MP-68R96	015/019		Mexico City Metro line 5	Mexico City Metro line B	
MP-68R96	016/083		Mexico City Metro line B		
MP-68R96	017/065		Mexico City Metro line 7	Mexico City Metro line B	Recovered Train "Elvia Carrillo Puerto"
	018/061		Mexico City Metro line B		
MP-68R96B	020/106		Mexico City Metro line B		Recovered Train "Tren Olímpico"
MP-68R93	021/097		Mexico City Metro line 5		
MP-68R96B	023/045		Mexico City Metro line 5		
MP-68R96B	024/056		Mexico City Metro line B		
MP-68R96B	025/114		Mexico City Metro line B		Decommissioned
MP-68R93	026/031		Mexico City Metro line B		
MP-68R93	027/066		Mexico City Metro line 7	Mexico City Metro line 5	Flooded train at Hangares on line 5 known as "El Ahogado" (The Drowned)
MP-68R93	028/059		Mexico City Metro line 7	Mexico City Metro line 5 Mexico City Metro line 6	
MP-68R96C	029/089		Mexico City Metro line 1		Recovered train "Guillermo Tovar de Teresa"
MP-68 (original)	030/113		Mexico City Metro line 2		Train accident at Viaducto station on line 2
MP-68R96B	034/100		Mexico City Metro line B		Inaugural Line B train - Decommissioned
MP68R93	035/073		Mexico City Metro line 7	Mexico City Metro line B	
MP-68R96	036/086		Mexico City Metro line B		
MP-68R96	038/096		Mexico City Metro line B		
MP-68R96C	042/058		Mexico City Metro line 1		
MP-68R93	043/074		Mexico City Metro line 7	Mexico City Metro line B	Recovered Train "Emmanuel Carballo"
MP-68R96	044/053		Mexico City Metro line B		Train Truly Recovered, by workers of Ciudad Azteca
MP-68R96	048/095		Mexico City Metro line B		Train Recovered by workers of Ciudad Azteca
MP-68R96	049/082		Mexico City Metro line B		Recovered Train "Juan Gelman" The only MP-68 with the mandarin color scheme
MP-68R93/R96	032/052		Mexico City Metro line 7	Mexico City Metro line 5	Nicknamed as "Rarito" or "Mezclado"
MP68R96	054/111		Mexico City Metro line 5	Mexico City Metro line B	Recovered Train "Efraín Huerta"
MP68R96	057/098		Mexico City Metro line B		
MP-68R96C	062/088		Mexico City Metro line 1		Train accident at Tacubaya station on line 1
MP-68R93	067/109		Mexico City Metro line 7	Mexico City Metro line 5	Recovered Train "Bellas Artes"
MP-68R93	075/085		Mexico City Metro line 7		Train accident at Oceanía station on line 5
MP-68R96	079/117		Mexico City Metro line B		
Mp-68R93	084/102		Mexico City Metro line 5		
MP-68R93	093/101		Mexico City Metro line 7		Train recovered by workers from the Workshops of Zaragoza
MP-68R96	094/112		Mexico City Metro line B		
MP-68R93	108/120		Mexico City Metro line 7	Mexico City Metro line 5	
MP-68R96	110/115		Mexico City Metro line 7	Mexico City Metro line B	Recovered Train "Pedro Infante"

== See also ==
- Mexico City Metro
- Rubber-tyred metro
- MP 59
- NM-02 (Mexico City Metro)
- Alstom
- Bombardier Transportation
