= Cuitláhuac (disambiguation) =

Cuitláhuac (c. 1476 – 1520) was a ruler of the Aztec city of Tenochtitlan in the sixteenth century. He is credited with leading the Mexica resistance to the Spanish invasion.

Cuitlahuac (Cuitláhuac) or Cuitlahuatzin may refer to:

== Places ==
- Cuitlahuac (altepetl), a pre-Columbian Aztec city-state
- Cuitláhuac, Veracruz, a municipality in the state of Veracruz, Mexico

== Other uses ==
- Cuitlahuatzin I, ruler of the pre-Columbian Aztec city-state Itztapalapan; grandfather of Cuitláhuac
- 2275 Cuitlahuac, an asteroid named after the Tenochtitlan ruler
- Cuitláhuac metro station, in Mexico City
- Cuitláhuac (Mexico City Metrobús), a BRT station in Mexico City
- USS John Rodgers (DD-574), a destroyer that served in the Mexican Navy as the ARM Cuitláhuac
