= Colegio Militar metro station =

Mexico City metro station

Colegio Militar
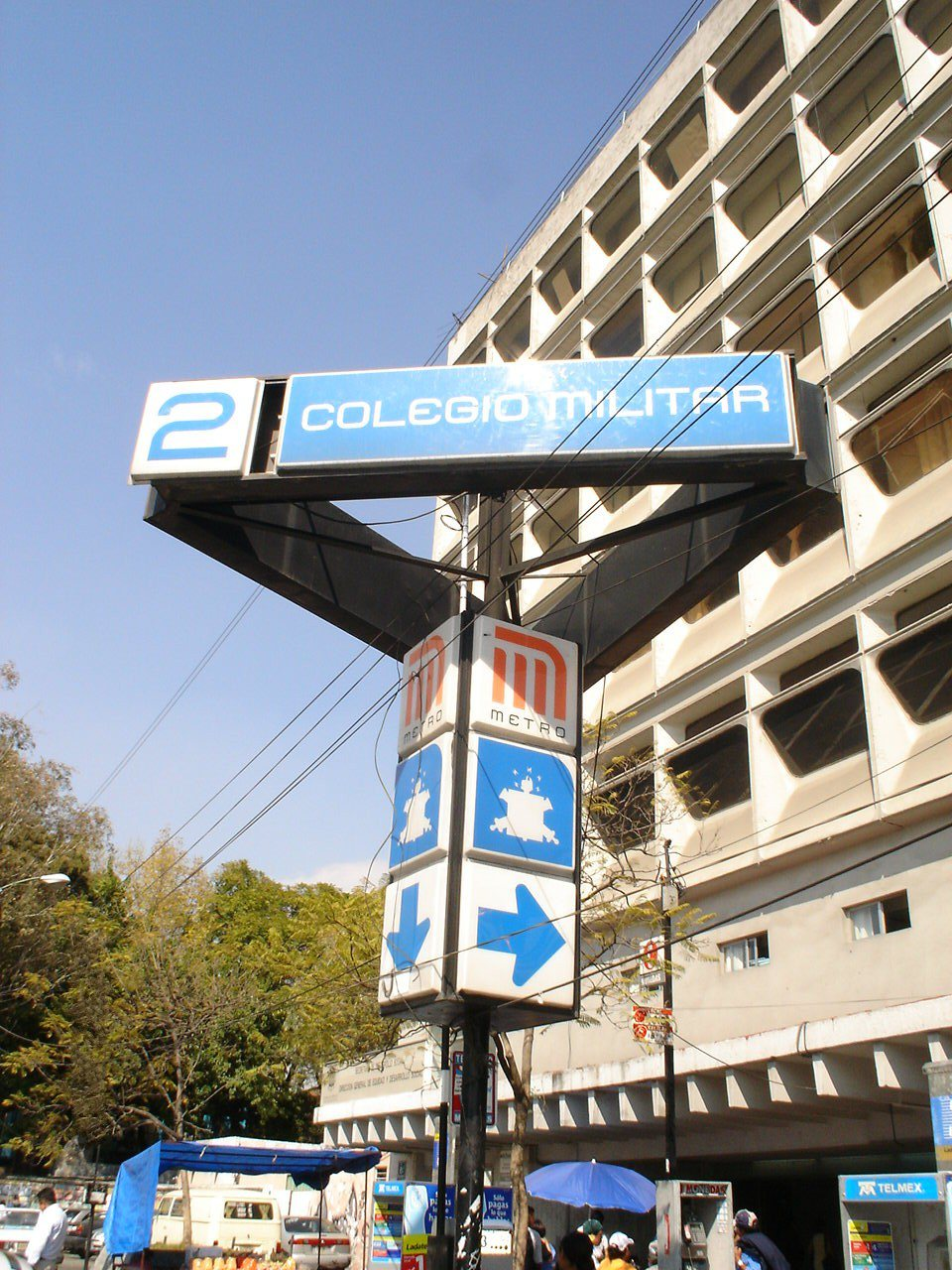
- Station entrance sign, 22 December 2006

General information
- Location: Calzada México-Tacuba; Popotla, Miguel Hidalgo; Mexico City; Mexico
- Coordinates: 19°26′58″N 99°10′20″W
- System: Mexico City Metro
- Platforms: 2 side platform
- Tracks: 2

Construction
- Structure type: Underground

History
- Opened: 14 September 1970; 55 years ago

Passengers
- 2025: 4,779,034 (Note: The data here is limited to the most recent ten years to avoid excessive listings; earlier figures can be found in this page's history or on the Mexico City Metro website. To calculate the average daily ridership, the annual total is divided by 365 days (366 in leap years), with decimals omitted from the result. Each station per line is ranked individually, as the system counts transfer stations separately. The percentage change is calculated automatically using the data from the current year and the previous year.) ▲0.27%
- Rank: 110/195

Services
Preceding station	Mexico City Metro	Following station
Popotla toward Cuatro Caminos	Line 2	Normal toward Tasqueña
Route map
Location
- Location within Mexico City
- Area map

Colegio Militar is a station on Line 2 of the Mexico City Metro system. It is located in the Miguel Hidalgo borough of Mexico City, northwest of the city centre, on Calzada México-Tacuba. In 2019 the station had an average ridership of 15,275 passengers per day.

== Name and pictogram ==
Colegio Militar means Military College and the station was named in reference to the Heroic Military College that existed in the vicinity of the Popotla neighborhood from 1920, when it was inaugurated by President Venustiano Carranza, until 1976, when it was moved to its current location in the south of Mexico City.

The station's pictogram shows the stylised coat of arms of the Military Academy.

== General information ==
The station opened on 14 September 1970 as part of the second stretch of Line 2, from Pino Suárez to Tacuba.

Colegio Militar serves the Colonia Anáhuac and Colonia Un Hogar para Nosotros neighborhood. The same facilities where the Military Academy once stood now house the Universidad del Ejército y Fuerza Aérea Mexicanos (Mexican Army and Air Force University).

From 2017 the station's walls have been covered with pictures depicting and honoring the Mexican Army and Air Force during their duty.

=== Ridership ===
Annual passenger ridership
Year	Ridership	Average daily	Rank	% change	Ref.
2025	4,779,034	13,093	110/195	+0.27%
2024	4,766,052	13,022	103/195	+1.64%
2023	4,689,088	12,846	101/195	+18.73%
2022	3,949,244	10,819	109/195	+86.42%
2021	2,118,471	5,804	136/195	−22.40%
2020	2,730,098	7,459	126/195	−44.62%
2019	5,575,408	15,275	119/195	−0.31%
2018	5,592,756	15,322	119/195	+1.47%
2017	5,511,466	15,099	115/195	−0.81%
2016	5,556,209	15,180	118/195	−3.43%

== Entrances ==
- North: Calzada México-Tacuba, Colonia Un Hogar para Nosotros
- Southwest: Calzada México-Tacuba and Felipe Carrillo Puerto street, Colonia Anáhuac
- Southeast: Calzada México-Tacuba and Felipe Carrillo Puerto street, Colonia Anáhuac

== See also ==
- List of Mexico City metro stations
