= Villa de Cortés metro station =

Mexico City metro station

Villa de Cortés
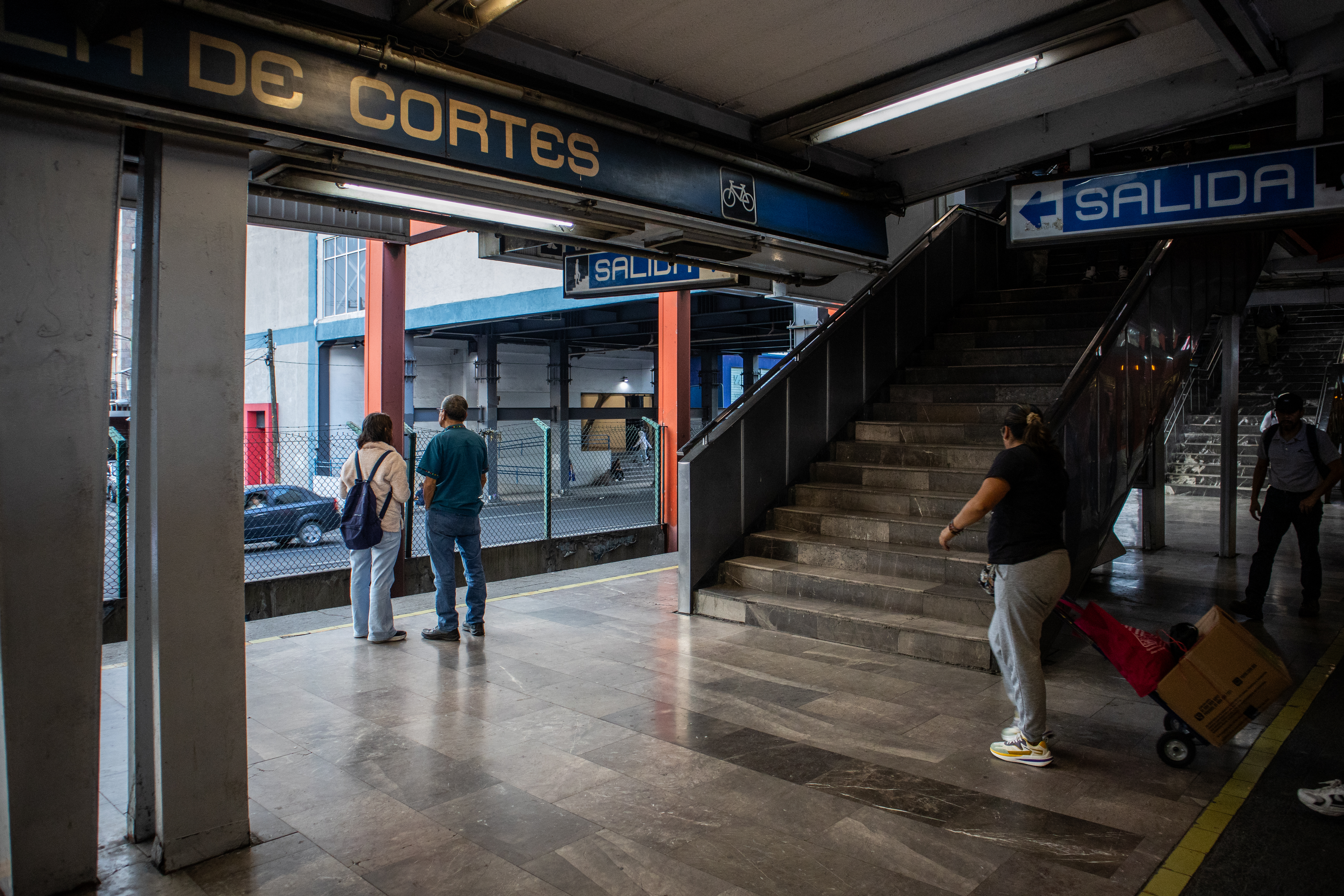

General information
- Location: Calzada de Tlalpan; Benito Juárez; Mexico City; Mexico
- Coordinates: 19°23′15″N 99°08′20″W
- System: Mexico City Metro
- Platforms: 1 island platform
- Tracks: 2

Construction
- Structure type: At grade
- Platform levels: 1
- Parking: No
- Cycle facilities: No
- Accessible: Yes

Other information
- Status: In service

History
- Opened: 1 August 1970; 56 years ago

Passengers
- 2025: 5,438,996 (Note: The data here is limited to the most recent ten years to avoid excessive listings; earlier figures can be found in this page's history or on the Mexico City Metro website. To calculate the average daily ridership, the annual total is divided by 365 days (366 in leap years), with decimals omitted from the result. Each station per line is ranked individually, as the system counts transfer stations separately. The percentage change is calculated automatically using the data from the current year and the previous year.) ▲4.77%
- Rank: 93/195

Services
Preceding station	Mexico City Metro	Following station
Xola toward Cuatro Caminos	Line 2	Nativitas toward Tasqueña
Route map
Location
- Location within Mexico City
- Area map

Villa de Cortés is a station on Line 2 of the Mexico City Metro system. It is located in the Benito Juárez borough of Mexico City, directly south of the city center on Calzada de Tlalpan. It is a surface station.

== General information ==
The station logo depicts a helmet of the type used by the Spanish conquerors (conquistadores) who, led by Hernán Cortés, invaded the Aztec empire in the 16th century. The name of this station comes from the area in which it is now located, which was known as the Villa de Cortés in colonial times. The metro station opened on August 1, 1970.

Metro Villa de Cortés provides a transfer with trolleybus Line "M", which runs between this station and the INFONAVIT Iztacalco neighbourhood.

=== Ridership ===
Annual passenger ridership
Year	Ridership	Average daily	Rank	% change	Ref.
2025	5,438,996	14,901	93/195	+4.77%
2024	5,191,292	14,183	87/195	+9.53%
2023	4,739,634	12,985	99/195	+14.21%
2022	4,149,960	11,369	104/195	+41.79%
2021	2,926,908	8,018	113/195	−1.54%
2020	2,972,566	8,121	117/195	−53.13%
2019	6,341,507	17,373	104/195	+2.90%
2018	6,162,928	16,884	108/195	−4.86%
2017	6,477,842	17,747	101/195	−4.34%
2016	6,772,031	18,502	97/195	−1.59%

== Exits ==
- East: Calzada de Tlalpan and Plaza Victoria, Villa de Cortés
- West: Calzada de Tlalpan between Guipúzcoa street and Ahorro Postal street, Colonia Niños Héroes de Churubusco

== See also ==
- List of Mexico City metro stations
