= NM-02 (Mexico City Metro) =

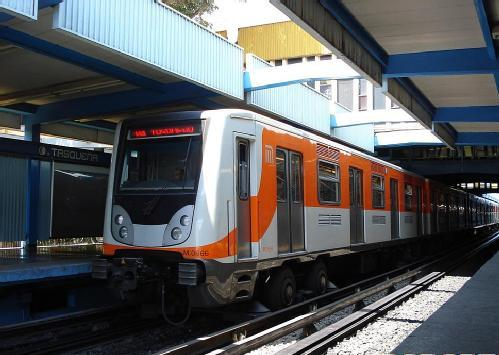
- NM-02 unit at the Tasqueña station of Line 2

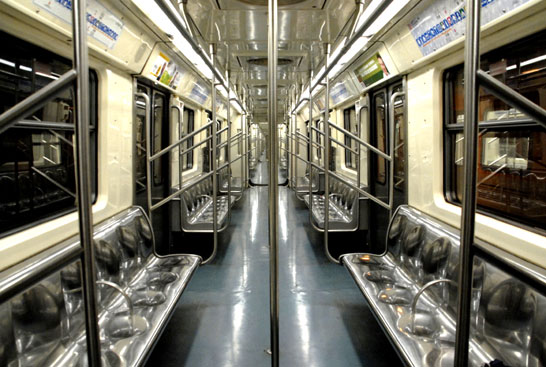
- Interior of an NM-02 car
- Stock type: Electric multiple unit
- In service: 2005–present
- Manufacturers: Bombardier, CAF
- Number built: 405 cars (45 trains)
- Formation: 9 cars per trainset
- Capacity: 1460 per train
- Operator: STC
- Line served: Mexico City Metro Line 2 Mexico City Metro Line 7

Specifications
- Train length: 150.9 m (495 ft 1 in)
- Width: 2.5 m (8 ft 2 3/8 in)
- Height: 3.6 m (11 ft 9 3/4 in)
- Maximum speed: 80 km/h (50 mph)
- Weight: 261 tonnes (575,000 lb)
- Traction system: VVVF
- Acceleration: 1.35 m/s^{2} (4.4 ft/s^{2})
- Electric system: 750 V DC guide bars
- Current collection: Collector shoe
- Track gauge: 1,435 mm (4 ft 8 1/2 in) standard gauge with roll ways along track

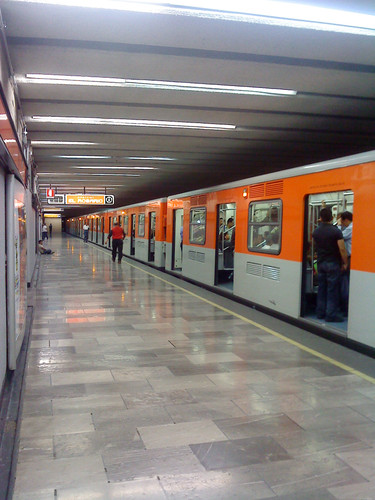
NM-02 in service in Line 7 at the Tacuba station.

The NM-02 (abbreviated from the Spanish: Neumático Mexicano 2002) is a rubber-tyred model of electrical multiple units used on the Mexico City Metro, first used in 2005 and currently servicing Line 2 and Line 7.

== History ==
In 2003, as part of a plan to modernize Mexico City Metro, Mexico City's government acquired 45 new NM-02 units to be used in Line 2 with a cost of 550 million dollars. Out of those 45 trains, 31 were already in service during 2005. The trains that were replaced by NM-02 in Line 2, were sent to be serviced in order to be transferred for their use in other lines.

The trains were manufactured by Canadian Bombardier and Spanish Construcciones y Auxiliar de Ferrocarriles (CAF). 17 units were provided by CAF and the rest by Bombardier.

CAF had previously supplied trains for the Mexico City Metro with the NE-92.

In 2011, STC retired MP-68 units from service in Line 7 and replaced them with NM-02 trains, which had been already servicing Line 7 with a few leased units from Line 2 since 2009.

As part of preparations for the 2026 FIFA World Cup, the Sistema de Transporte Colectivo installed non-slip seats and backrests at several NM-02 trains.

== Description ==
A NM-02 trainset has nine cars which are interconnected, allowing passengers to change from one car to another. Also, the units have a sound system that gives safety announcements to the passengers as well as a voice recording that announces the station the train is in and the next station. This was the first model to have this features to be used in Mexico City Metro system.

In 2010, to commemorate the Bicentenary of the Mexican War of Independence and the Centenary of the Mexican Revolution, Line 2 trains were decorated with liveries showing pictures and phrases of historical figures of both events such as Miguel Hidalgo, Vicente Guerrero, Álvaro Obregón and Francisco I. Madero.

== Technical specifications ==
The following are the NM-02 specifications.

- Length: 150.9 m (495 ft 1 in)
- Width: 2.5 m (8 ft 2 3/8 in)
- Height: 3.6 m (11 ft 9 3/4 in)
- Composition: Mc+T+M+M+T+M+M+T+Mc
- Passenger capacity: 1460 passengers (a density of 6 per square meter or 5 per square yard)

== Equipment ==
NM-02 units are equipped with the following.

- Onboard computer system with cab monitoring terminal and light signal box
- Wi-Fi
- Event recorders
- Radio-telephone system
- Passenger and cab ventilation system
- Information and communication system
- Emergency brake handles
- Halogen lamps
