= Mexico City Metro Line 2 =

Metro line in Mexico City

Line 2

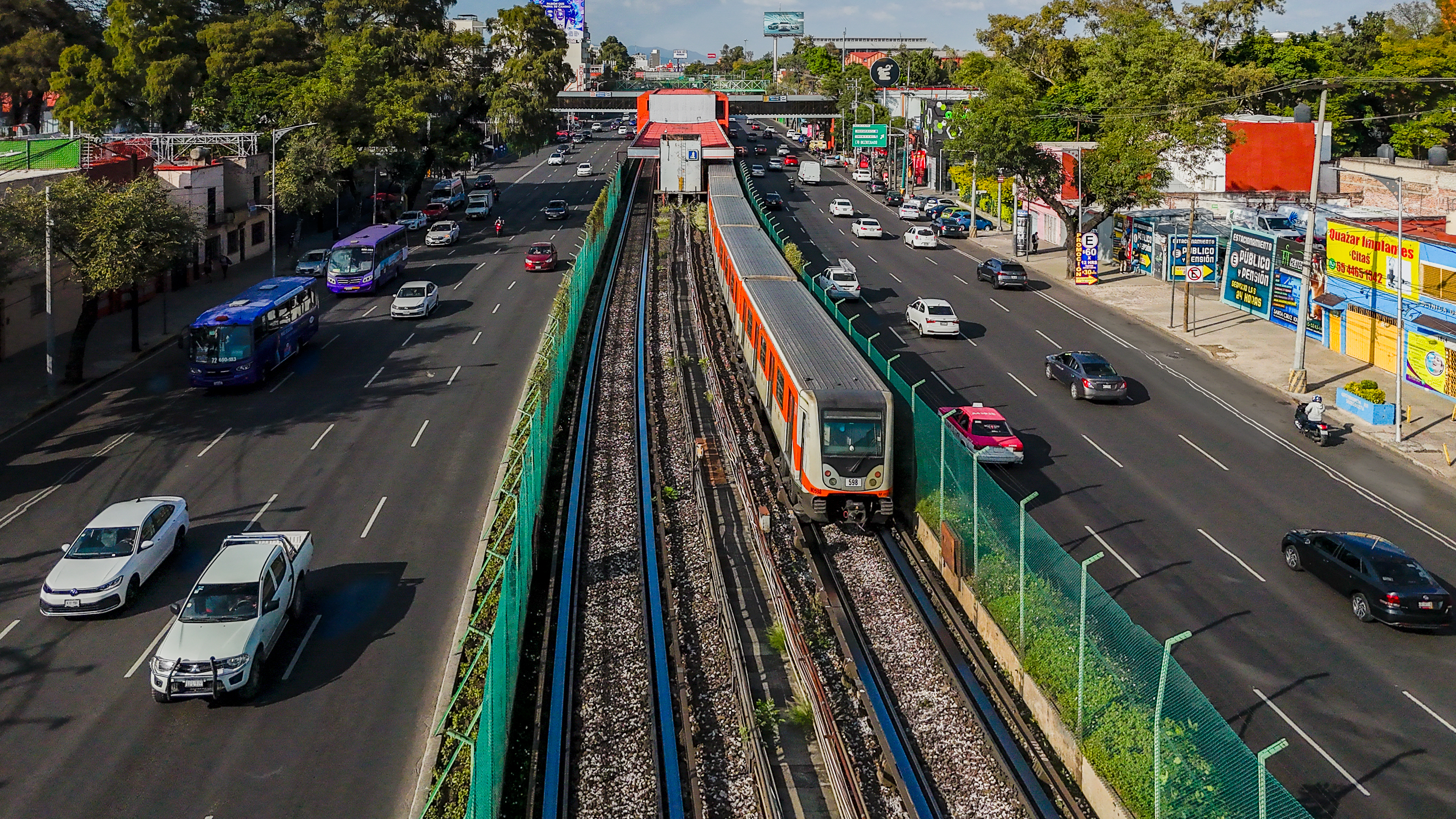
- An NM-02 train arriving in General Anaya metro station

Overview
- Locale: Mexico City
- Termini: Cuatro Caminos; Tasqueña
- Connecting lines: at Tacuba; at Hidalgo; at Bellas Artes; at Pino Suárez; at Chabacano; at Ermita
- Stations: 24
- Website: metro.cdmx.gob.mx

Service
- Type: Rapid transit
- System: Mexico City Metro
- Operator: Sistema de Transporte Colectivo (STC)
- Rolling stock: NM-02
- Ridership: 212,233,035 (2024)

History
- Opened: 1 August 1970; 56 years ago
- Last extension: 1984

Technical
- Line length: 20.713 km (12.9 mi)
- Track length: 23.431 km (14.6 mi)
- Track gauge: 1,435 mm (4 ft 8 1/2 in) standard gauge with roll ways along track
- Electrification: Guide bar, 750 V DC
- Operating speed: 36 km/h (22 mph)
Route map
Line 2 route highlighted in gray

Mexico City Metro Line 2 is one of the 12 lines of the Mexico City Metro. Identified by the color blue, it runs in a general northwest–south direction between Cuatro Caminos in the State of Mexico and Tasqueña in southern Mexico City, where the Mexico City Light Rail continues the rail corridor south to Xochimilco. Opened in 1970, it was the second line in the system to enter service. Following two extensions, Line 2 comprises 24 stations, the most of any line in the network, and has a total route length of 20.7 kilometres (12.9 mi). With more than 212 million passengers in 2024, it is the busiest line on the Mexico City Metro system.

== General information ==
Line 2 connects with Line 7 at Tacuba, Line 3 at Hidalgo, Line 8 at Bellas Artes, Line 1 at Pino Suárez, Lines 8 and 9 at Chabacano and Line 12 at Ermita. It is linked with the Mexico City Light Rail to Xochimilco at the Tasqueña terminal. It used to be served by NC-82 and some NM-83 trains.

It runs under the following roads: Calzada San Bartolo Naucalpan in the stretch from Cuatro Caminos to Panteones, Calzada México-Tacuba from Panteones to Normal, Av. Ribera de San Cosme, Av. México - Tenochtitlan from Revolución to Hidalgo, Av. Hidalgo from Hidalgo to Bellas Artes, Tacuba street, República de Guatemala street, José María Pino Suárez street from Zócalo/Tenochtitlan to Pino Suárez. From San Antonio Abad it runs at ground level over Calzada San Antonio Abad and Calzada de Tlalpan till the terminus of the line in Tasqueña. With 737,396 passengers per day in 2019, it is the busiest line of the Mexico City Metro.

== History ==
Line 2 opened on August 1, 1970, in the stretch Tasqueña–Pino Suárez. Pino Suárez station became the first transfer station of the Mexico City Metro, connecting with Line 1, built one year before.

On September 14, the line was expanded towards Tacuba station.

The last expansion of the line occurred in 1984 when two more stations were built: Panteones and Cuatro Caminos, the latter being the first station of the system to serve the State of Mexico. Cuatro Caminos would remain as the only station to serve the suburbs of Mexico City until 1991, when Line A opened and service reached the municipality of Los Reyes La Paz, in the southeastern part of the State of Mexico with the stations Los Reyes and La Paz.

=== 1975 train crash ===
This line has seen the worst accident in Mexico City history when on October 20, 1975, when there was a crash between two trains at Viaducto metro station. One train was parked at the station picking up passengers when it was hit by another train that did not stop in time. At least 27 people were killed and several wounded. After this accident, automatic traffic lights were installed in all lines.

== Chronology ==
- August 1, 1970: from Tasqueña to Pino Suárez.
- September 14, 1970: from Pino Suárez to Tacuba.
- August 22, 1984: from Tacuba to Cuatro Caminos.

== Rolling stock ==
Line 2 has had different types of rolling stock throughout the years.

- Alstom MP-68: : 1970–1975 2023
- Concarril NM-73: : 1975–2005 2023
- Concarril NM-79: 1980–2006 2023
- Alstom MP-82: 1985–2007
- Bombardier NC-82: 1987–2005 2023
- CAF/Bombardier NM-02: 2004–present

Currently, out of the 390 trains in the Mexico City Metro network, 40 are in service in Line 2.

== Station list ==
Key (Note: The following list was adapted from different websites and official maps.: Metro connections obtained from the official Mexico City Metro system map.; Accessibility obtained from the Mexico City Metro system map. In some cases, the map omits the accessibility icon as the station(s) are actually partially accessible. However, the respective websites of each station on the official site indicate the respective accessibility methods. Stations with the symbol are fully accessible; stations with the symbol are partially accessible.; Cablebús obtained from their official website.; Centro de transferencia modal (CETRAM;) obtained from the official website of the Órgano Regulador de Transporte.; Ecobici obtained from their official website.; Metrobús obtained from the Mexico City Metrobús system map.; Mexibús obtained from the official Mexico City Metro system map.; Mexicable obtained from the official Mexico City Metro system map.; Public buses network (peseros) obtained from the official website of the Órgano Regulador de Transporte.; Red de Transporte de Pasajeros obtained from their official website.; Trolleybuses obtained from their official website.)
Handicapped/disabled access	Fully accessible station	Cablebús Line {{{3}}}	Cablebús connection	Red de Transporte de Pasajeros	RTP connection
Handicapped/disabled access	Partially accessible station	Mexibús	Mexibús connection	Tren Interurbano	Tren Interurbano connection
Transfer hub	CETRAM transfer station	Mexicable	Mexicable connection	Tren Suburbano	Tren Suburbano connection
Transfer hub	ETRAM transfer station	Mexico City Metro	Mexico City Metro connection	Trolleybus	Trolleybus connection
Ecobici	Ecobici bikeshare	Mexico City minubus	Pesero connection	Mexico City Light Rail	Mexico City Light Rail connection

The stations from west to east and from north to south:

Station	Handicapped/disabled access	Opened	Level	Distance (km)		Connections	Location	
Station	Handicapped/disabled access	Opened	Level	Between stations	Total	Connections	Location	
Cuatro Caminos	Handicapped/disabled access	August 22, 1984	Underground	—N/a	0.0	18, 57A, 57C; 16B; Line 3 (under construction)	Naucalpan	State of Mexico
Panteones		August 22, 1984	Underground	1.8	1.8	18; 16B	Miguel Hidalgo	Mexico City
Tacuba	Handicapped/disabled access	September 14, 1970	Underground	1.6	3.4	18, 59, 107; 11A, 16B, 16D, 19H	Miguel Hidalgo	Mexico City
Cuitláhuac		September 14, 1970	Underground	0.7	4.1	(at Calz. México-Tacuba); 18, 19, 107, 107B; 16B, 16D	Miguel Hidalgo	Mexico City
Popotla		September 14, 1970	Underground	0.8	4.9	18; 16B, 16D	Miguel Hidalgo	Mexico City
Colegio Militar		September 14, 1970	Underground	0.6	5.5	16B	Miguel Hidalgo	Mexico City
Normal		September 14, 1970	Underground	0.7	6.2	19, 19A, 200; 16A, 16B	Miguel Hidalgo	Mexico City
San Cosme		September 14, 1970	Underground	0.8	7.0	59A; 12B, 12D, 16A, 16B	Cuauhtémoc	Mexico City
Revolución	Handicapped/disabled access	September 14, 1970	Underground	0.8	7.8	(at México Tenochtitlan); 16A, 16B	Cuauhtémoc	Mexico City
Hidalgo	Handicapped/disabled access	September 14, 1970	Underground	0.7	8.5	27A; 16A	Cuauhtémoc	Mexico City
Bellas Artes	Handicapped/disabled access	September 14, 1970	Underground	0.6	9.1	16A	Cuauhtémoc	Mexico City
Allende		September 14, 1970	Underground	0.5	9.6		Cuauhtémoc	Mexico City
Zócalo/Tenochtitlan	Handicapped/disabled access	September 14, 1970	Underground	0.8	10.4	Ecobici	Cuauhtémoc	Mexico City
Pino Suárez	Handicapped/disabled access	August 1, 1970	Underground	0.9	11.3	(at Nezahualcóyotl); 2A, 31B, 111A, 145A; 17C, 17H, 17I, 19E, 19F, 19G, 19H	Cuauhtémoc	Mexico City
San Antonio Abad	Handicapped/disabled access	August 1, 1970	Ground-level	1.0	12.3	2A, 31B, 111A, 145A; 14A, 17C, 17H, 17I	Cuauhtémoc	Mexico City
Chabacano	Handicapped/disabled access	August 1, 1970 (Note: Chabacano Line 2 was rebuilt as part of the introduction of Line 9 in 1988 to support three-line transfer with middle-platform solution (Line 8 was built in 1994).)	Ground-level	0.8	13.1	2A, 31B, 33, 111A, 145A; 9C, 9E, 14A, 17C, 17H, 17I	Cuauhtémoc	Mexico City
Viaducto		August 1, 1970	Ground-level	0.9	14.0	2A, 31B, 111A, 145A; 17C, 17H, 17I	Benito Juárez	Mexico City
Xola	Handicapped/disabled access	August 1, 1970	Ground-level	0.6	14.6	2A, 31B, 111A, 145A; 17C, 17H, 17I	Benito Juárez	Mexico City
Villa de Cortés	Handicapped/disabled access	August 1, 1970	Ground-level	0.8	15.4	2A, 31B, 111A, 145A; 17C, 17H, 17I	Benito Juárez	Mexico City
Nativitas	Handicapped/disabled access	August 1, 1970	Ground-level	0.9	16.3	2A, 31B, 111A, 145A; 17C, 17H, 17I	Benito Juárez	Mexico City
Portales	Handicapped/disabled access	August 1, 1970	Ground-level	1.1	17.4	(at Miravalle); 2A, 31B, 111A, 145A; 17C, 17H, 17I	Benito Juárez	Mexico City
Ermita	Handicapped/disabled access	August 1, 1970	Ground-level	0.9	18.3	2A, 31B, 52C, 111A, 145A; 17C, 17H, 17I	Benito Juárez	Mexico City
General Anaya	Handicapped/disabled access	August 1, 1970	Ground-level	1.0	19.3	2A, 31B, 111A, 116A, 145A; 17C, 17H, 17I	Coyoacán	Mexico City
Tasqueña	Handicapped/disabled access	August 1, 1970	Ground-level	1.5	20.8	2A, 17F, 31B, 81A, 111A, 143, 145A; 2A, 2F, 17C, 17H, 17I; South Bus Terminal	Coyoacán	Mexico City

== Ridership ==
The following table shows each of Line 2 stations total and average daily ridership during 2019.

†	Transfer station
‡	Terminal

Rank	Station	Total ridership	Average daily
1	Cuatro Caminos‡	39,378,128	107,885
2	Tasqueña‡	26,905,368	73,713
3	Zócalo/Tenochtitlan	26,138,960	71,614
4	Normal	12,870,083	35,261
5	Tacuba†	12,081,287	33,099
6	Bellas Artes†	11,057,441	30,294
7	Revolución	10,775,619	29,522
8	Allende	10,538,474	28,873
9	Chabacano†	10,452,786	28,638
10	Hidalgo†	9,967,554	27,308
11	Pino Suárez†	9,540,733	26,139
12	General Anaya	8,881,306	24,332
13	San Cosme	8,355,454	22,892
14	Portales	8,201,726	22,470
15	Xola	8,146,220	22,318
16	San Antonio Abad	7,897,611	21,637
17	Viaducto	7,543,940	20,668
18	Nativitas	7,163,027	19,625
19	Cuitláhuac	6,794,715	18,616
20	Villa de Cortés	6,341,507	17,374
21	Ermita†	5,962,152	16,335
22	Colegio Militar	5,575,408	15,275
23	Panteones	4,929,735	13,506
24	Popotla	3,650,212	10,001
Total		269,149,446	737,396

== Tourism ==
Sound of Mexico City Metro train arriving to a station
At General Anaya station.

Line 2 passes near several places of interest:

- Monumento a la Revolución, a monument commemorating the Mexican Revolution located in Plaza de la República (Republic Square).
- Paseo de la Reforma, emblematic avenue of Mexico City.
- Alameda Central, public urban park in downtown Mexico City and oldest public park in the Americas.
- Palacio de Bellas Artes, Palace of Fine Arts, cultural center.
- Historic center of Mexico City
- Plaza de la Constitución, Mexico City's main square.
- Metropolitan Cathedral
- National Palace, the seat of the federal executive in Mexico.
- Templo Mayor, archeological site and museum.
