= Nativitas metro station =

Mexico City metro station

Nativitas
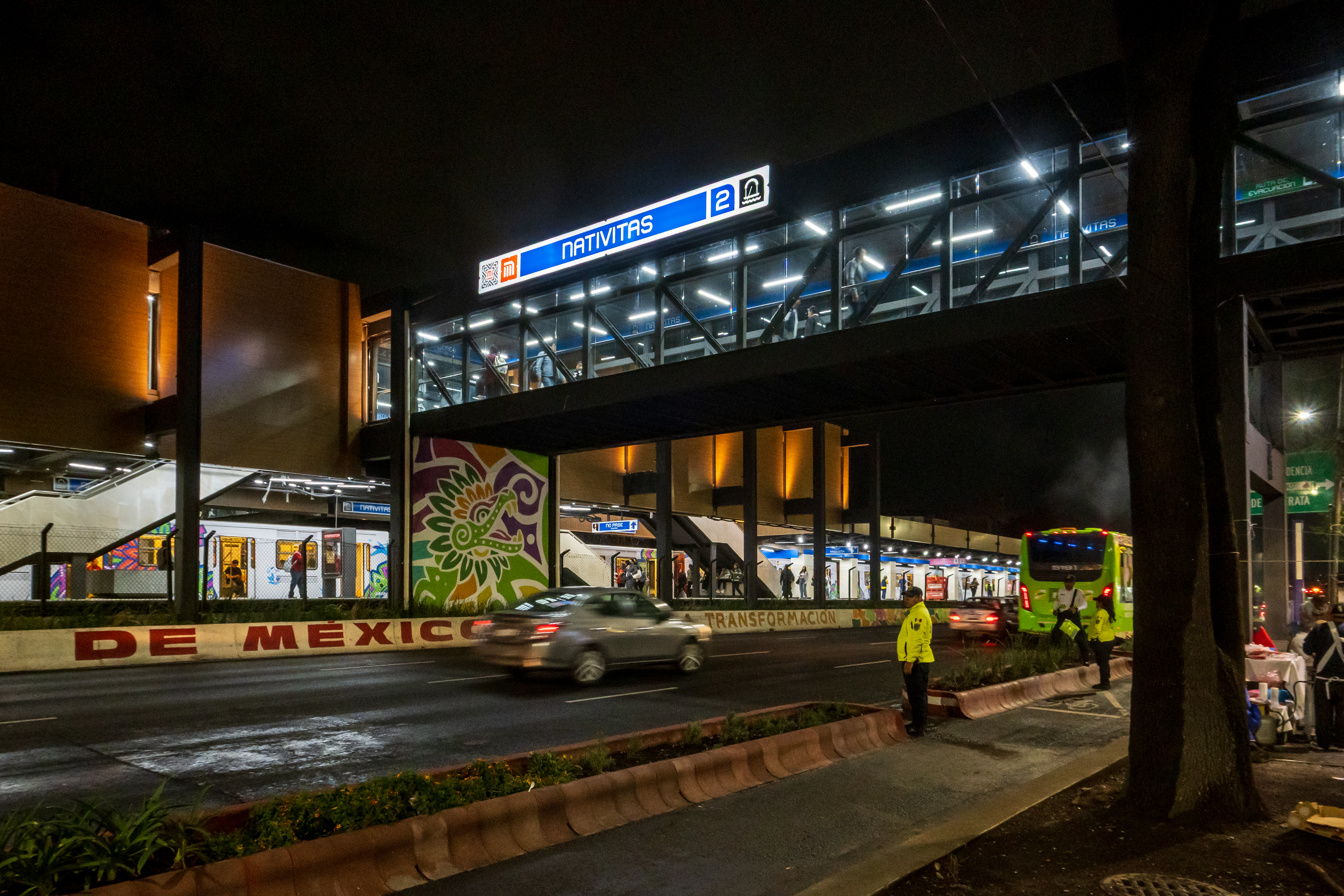
- Platform of the station, 2026.

General information
- Location: Calzada de Tlalpan; Benito Juárez; Mexico City; Mexico
- Coordinates: 19°22′46″N 99°08′25″W
- System: Mexico City Metro
- Platforms: 1 island platform
- Tracks: 2

Construction
- Structure type: At grade
- Platform levels: 1
- Parking: No
- Cycle facilities: No
- Accessible: Yes

Other information
- Status: In service

History
- Opened: 1 August 1970; 56 years ago

Passengers
- 2025: 6,116,761 (Note: The data here is limited to the most recent ten years to avoid excessive listings; earlier figures can be found in this page's history or on the Mexico City Metro website. To calculate the average daily ridership, the annual total is divided by 365 days (366 in leap years), with decimals omitted from the result. Each station per line is ranked individually, as the system counts transfer stations separately. The percentage change is calculated automatically using the data from the current year and the previous year.) ▲1.42%
- Rank: 75/195

Services
Preceding station	Mexico City Metro	Following station
Villa de Cortés toward Cuatro Caminos	Line 2	Portales toward Tasqueña
Route map
Location
- Location within Mexico City
- Area map

Nativitas is a station on Line 2 of the Mexico City Metro system. It is located in the Colonia Nativitas and Colonia Lago neighborhoods of Benito Juárez borough of Mexico City, directly south of the city centre on Calzada de Tlalpan. It is a surface station.

== General information ==
The station logo depicts a trajinera – a type of small punt-style boat, still used today in the canals of Xochimilco. The name Nativitas refers to a lake that formerly existed here, on which the inhabitants farmed on a network of artificial islands known as chinampas. The name later referred to a small villa built in the outskirts of Mexico City during the first half of the 20th century. The station opened on 1 August 1970.

=== Exits ===
- East: Calzada de Tlalpan between Justina street and Don Luis street, Nativitas
- West: Calzada de Tlalpan and Lago Poniente street, Colonia Lago

=== Ridership ===
Annual passenger ridership
Year	Ridership	Average daily	Rank	% change	Ref.
2025	6,116,761	16,758	75/195	+1.42%
2024	6,030,879	16,477	74/195	+0.21%
2023	6,018,409	16,488	75/195	+27.10%
2022	4,735,197	12,973	91/195	+48.41%
2021	3,190,651	8,741	104/195	−29.62%
2020	4,533,317	12,386	74/195	−36.71%
2019	7,163,027	19,624	91/195	−19.37%
2018	8,883,727	24,338	58/195	+22.77%
2017	7,236,315	19,825	88/195	−6.99%
2016	7,780,389	21,257	85/195	+3.33%

== See also ==
- List of Mexico City metro stations
