= Revolución metro station (Mexico City) =

Mexico City metro station

Revolución
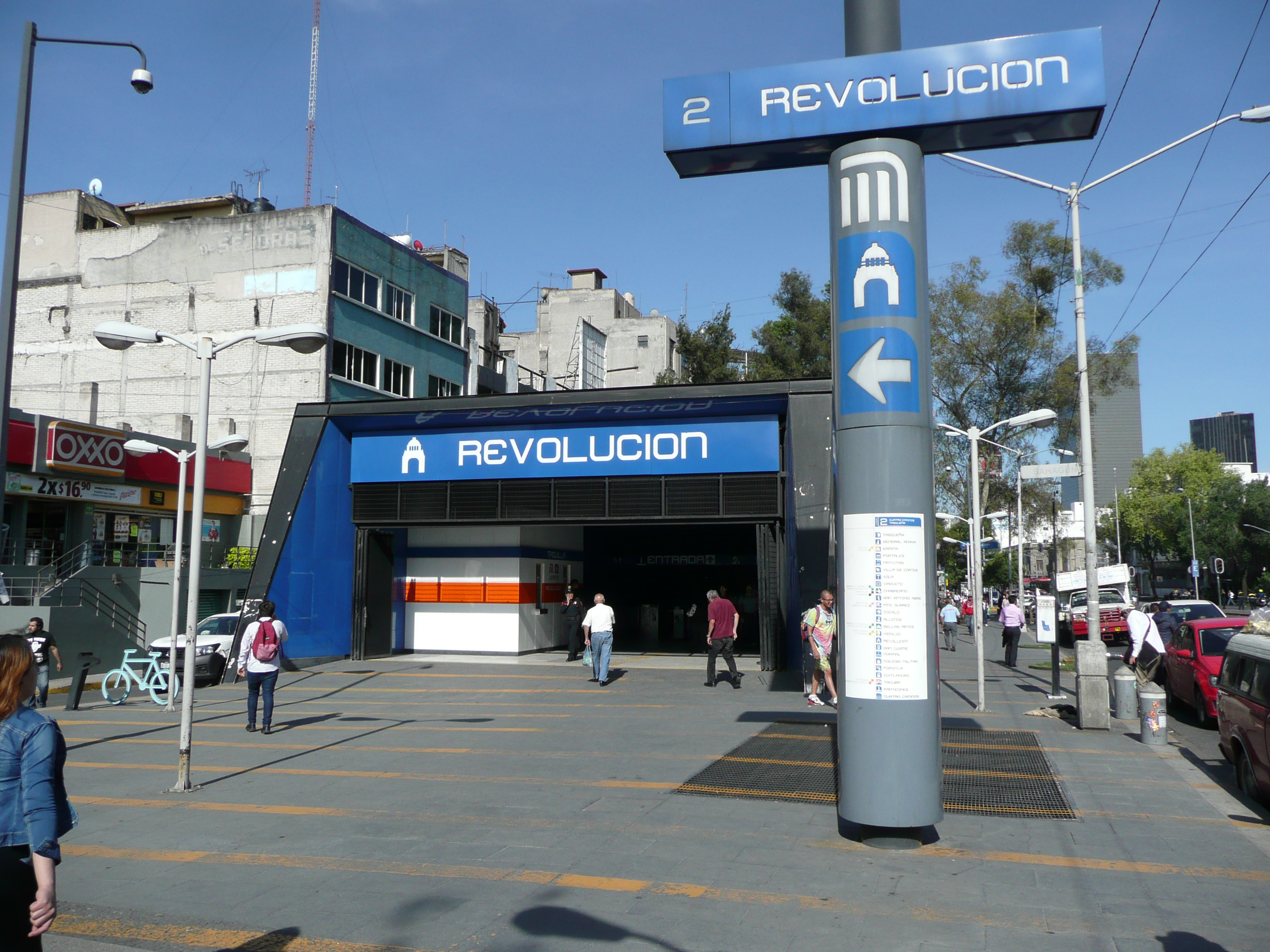
- Entrance, 2019

General information
- Location: México–Tenochtitlan Avenue, Cuauhtémoc; Mexico City; Mexico
- Coordinates: 19°26′22″N 99°09′20″W
- System: Mexico City Metro
- Platforms: 2 side platforms
- Tracks: 2
- Connections: Revolución; México Tenochtitlan

Construction
- Structure type: Underground
- Platform levels: 1
- Parking: No
- Cycle facilities: No
- Accessible: Yes

History
- Opened: 14 September 1970; 55 years ago

Passengers
- 2025: 9,276,915 (Note: The data here is limited to the most recent ten years to avoid excessive listings; earlier figures can be found in this page's history or on the Mexico City Metro website. To calculate the average daily ridership, the annual total is divided by 365 days (366 in leap years), with decimals omitted from the result. Each station per line is ranked individually, as the system counts transfer stations separately. The percentage change is calculated automatically using the data from the current year and the previous year.) ▼1.33%
- Rank: 35/195

Services
| Preceding station | Mexico City Metro | Following station |
|---|---|---|
| San Cosme toward Cuatro Caminos | Line 2 | Hidalgo toward Tasqueña |
Route map
Location
- Location within Mexico City
- Area map

Revolución is a station on Line 2 of the Mexico City Metro system. It is located in the Colonia Tabacalera and Colonia Buenavista districts in the Cuauhtémoc borough of Mexico City, northwest of the city centre, on Avenida México - Tenochtitlan. It was first opened to the public on 14 September 1970.

== General information ==
The station logo and name come from the nearby Monumento a la Revolución, which opened in 1938.

The station is also near Avenida de los Insurgentes, one of the city's most important thoroughfares. The Insurgentes Metrobús bus rapid transit line has a stop in the vicinity of Revolución.

=== Ridership ===
Annual passenger ridership
| Year | Ridership | Average daily | Rank | % change | Ref. |
|---|---|---|---|---|---|
| 2025 | 9,276,915 | 25,416 | 35/195 | −1.33% |
| 2024 | 9,401,897 | 25,688 | 32/195 | +8.53% |
| 2023 | 8,662,849 | 23,733 | 35/195 | +25.64% |
| 2022 | 6,895,149 | 18,890 | 48/195 | +53.39% |
| 2021 | 4,495,227 | 12,315 | 62/195 | −16.88% |
| 2020 | 5,408,333 | 14,776 | 53/195 | −49.81% |
| 2019 | 10,775,619 | 29,522 | 44/195 | −0.88% |
| 2018 | 10,871,623 | 29,785 | 43/195 | +2.71% |
| 2017 | 10,584,664 | 28,999 | 44/195 | +1.29% |
| 2016 | 10,450,175 | 28,552 | 47/195 | +64.04% |

== Nearby ==
- Monumento a la Revolución, monument commemorating the Mexican Revolution.
- Museo Nacional de San Carlos, art museum devoted to European art.

== Exits ==
- South: México - Tenochtitlan street, Colonia Tabacalera
- Northeast: México - Tenochtitlan street and B. de Sahagún street, Colonia Buenavista
- Northwest: México - Tenochtitlan street, Colonia Buenavista

== See also ==
- List of Mexico City metro stations
