= Panteones metro station =

Mexico City metro station

Panteones
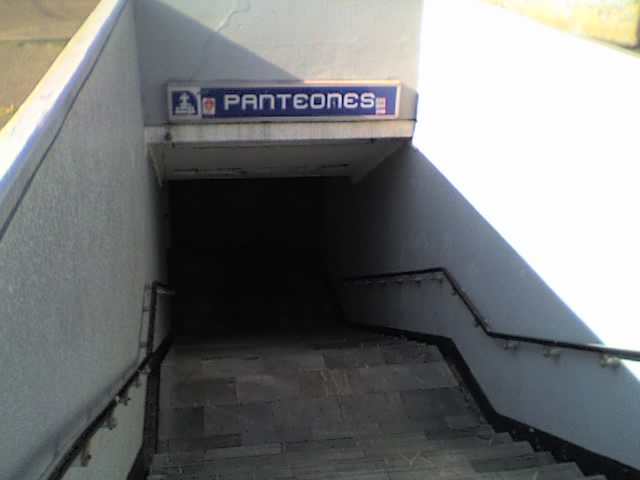
- Entrance to the station in 2009

General information
- Location: Colonia Argentina, Miguel Hidalgo; Mexico City; Mexico
- Coordinates: 19°27′32″N 99°12′11″W
- System: Mexico City Metro
- Operator: Sistema de Transporte Colectivo (STC)
- Platforms: 2 side platforms
- Tracks: 2

Construction
- Structure type: Underground

Other information
- Status: In service

History
- Opened: 22 August 1984; 42 years ago

Passengers
- 2025: 3,685,280 (Note: The data here is limited to the most recent ten years to avoid excessive listings; earlier figures can be found in this page's history or on the Mexico City Metro website. To calculate the average daily ridership, the annual total is divided by 365 days (366 in leap years), with decimals omitted from the result. Each station per line is ranked individually, as the system counts transfer stations separately. The percentage change is calculated automatically using the data from the current year and the previous year.) ▼3.75%
- Rank: 139/195

Services
Preceding station	Mexico City Metro	Following station
Cuatro Caminos Terminus	Line 2	Tacuba toward Tasqueña
Route map
Location
- Location within Mexico City
- Area map

Panteones is a station serving Line 2 of the Mexico City Metro. It is located in the Colonia Argentina district of the Miguel Hidalgo borough of the Mexican Federal District. Panteón means "cemetery" in Spanish; the station's name and logo come from the nearby graveyards. The station was opened as part of a westward extension of Line 2 on 22 August 1984.

From 23 April to 24 June 2020, the station was temporarily closed due to the COVID-19 pandemic in Mexico.

== Ridership ==
Annual passenger ridership
Year	Ridership	Average daily	Rank	% change	Ref.
2025	3,685,280	10,096	139/195	−3.75%
2024	3,829,017	10,461	127/195	−1.96%
2023	3,905,488	10,699	112/195	+12.55%
2022	3,469,997	9,506	121/195	+55.22%
2021	2,235,576	6,124	132/195	−1.73%
2020	2,274,937	6,215	144/195	−53.85%
2019	4,929,735	13,506	132/195	+8.54%
2018	4,541,992	12,443	133/195	−13.90%
2017	5,275,374	14,453	120/195	−8.41%
2016	5,759,783	15,737	114/195	+4.87%

== Nearby ==
- Panteón Español, a graveyard
- Panteón Sanctorum, a graveyard

== Gallery ==
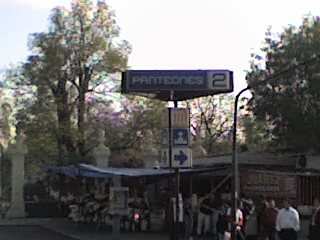
Metro Station Panteones, 9 April 2009
