= General Anaya metro station (Mexico City) =

Mexico City metro station

General Anaya
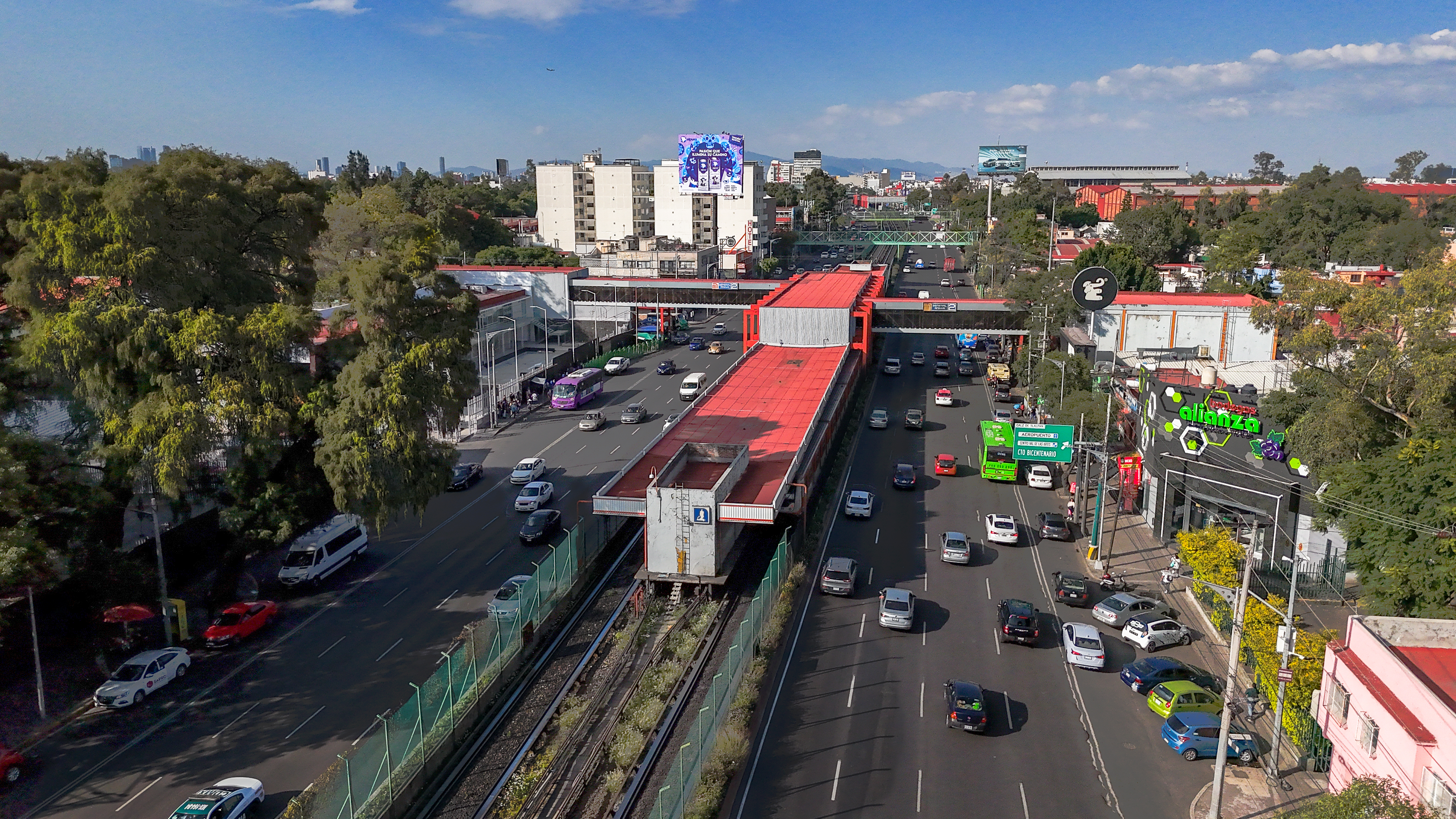
- Aerial view of the station.

General information
- Location: Calzada de Tlalpan; Coyoacán; Mexico City; Mexico
- Coordinates: 19°21′12″N 99°08′42″W
- System: Mexico City Metro
- Platforms: 1 island platform
- Tracks: 2

Construction
- Structure type: At grade
- Platform levels: 1
- Parking: No
- Cycle facilities: No
- Accessible: Yes

Other information
- Status: In service

History
- Opened: 1 August 1970; 56 years ago

Passengers
- 2025: 6,647,350 (Note: The data here is limited to the most recent ten years to avoid excessive listings; earlier figures can be found in this page's history or on the Mexico City Metro website. To calculate the average daily ridership, the annual total is divided by 365 days (366 in leap years), with decimals omitted from the result. Each station per line is ranked individually, as the system counts transfer stations separately. The percentage change is calculated automatically using the data from the current year and the previous year.) ▼0.01%
- Rank: 64/195

Services
Preceding station	Mexico City Metro	Following station
Ermita toward Cuatro Caminos	Line 2	Tasqueña Terminus
Route map
Location
- Location within Mexico City
- Area map

General Anaya is a station on Line 2 of the Mexico City Metro system. It is located in the Coyoacán borough of Mexico City, directly south of the city centre in the median of Calzada de Tlalpan, and right next to the Estudios Churubusco. It is a surface station.

== General information ==
The station logo shows a military officer standing next to a cannon. This is because the station is named after General Pedro María Anaya, commander of the Mexican forces during the 1847 Battle of Churubusco of the Mexican–American War. The battle happened around the small monastery of Churubusco, located not far away from the station. The monastery was later turned into the Museo Nacional de las Intervenciones and still exhibits some of the artillery used during the battle. The station opened on 1 August 1970.

=== Ridership ===
Annual passenger ridership
Year	Ridership	Average daily	Rank	% change	Ref.
2025	6,647,350	18,211	64/195	−0.01%
2024	6,647,930	18,163	60/195	+3.46%
2023	6,425,389	17,603	69/195	+20.26%
2022	5,342,957	14,638	81/195	+62.94%
2021	3,279,093	8,983	99/195	−10.35%
2020	3,657,591	9,993	102/195	−58.82%
2019	8,881,306	24,332	58/195	−12.17%
2018	10,111,964	27,704	48/195	−3.49%
2017	10,477,674	28,705	46/195	−1.61%
2016	10,649,317	29,096	45/195	−11.04%

== Nearby ==
- Parque Masayoshi Ōhira, park dedicated to the friendship between Mexico and Japan.
- Museo Nacional de las Intervenciones, National Museum of the Interventions.
- Club Campestre de la Ciudad de México, country club.
- Estudios Churubusco, movie studios.
- Centro Nacional de las Artes, national center of arts, housing the national schools of film, performing arts, classic and contemporary dance, music and painting, sculpture and printmaking.

== Exits ==
- East: Calzada de Tlalpan between Corredores street and Ciclistas street, Colonia Country Club
- West: Calzada de Tlalpan between 20 de agosto street and Callejón General Anaya, Colonia Churubusco

== Gallery ==
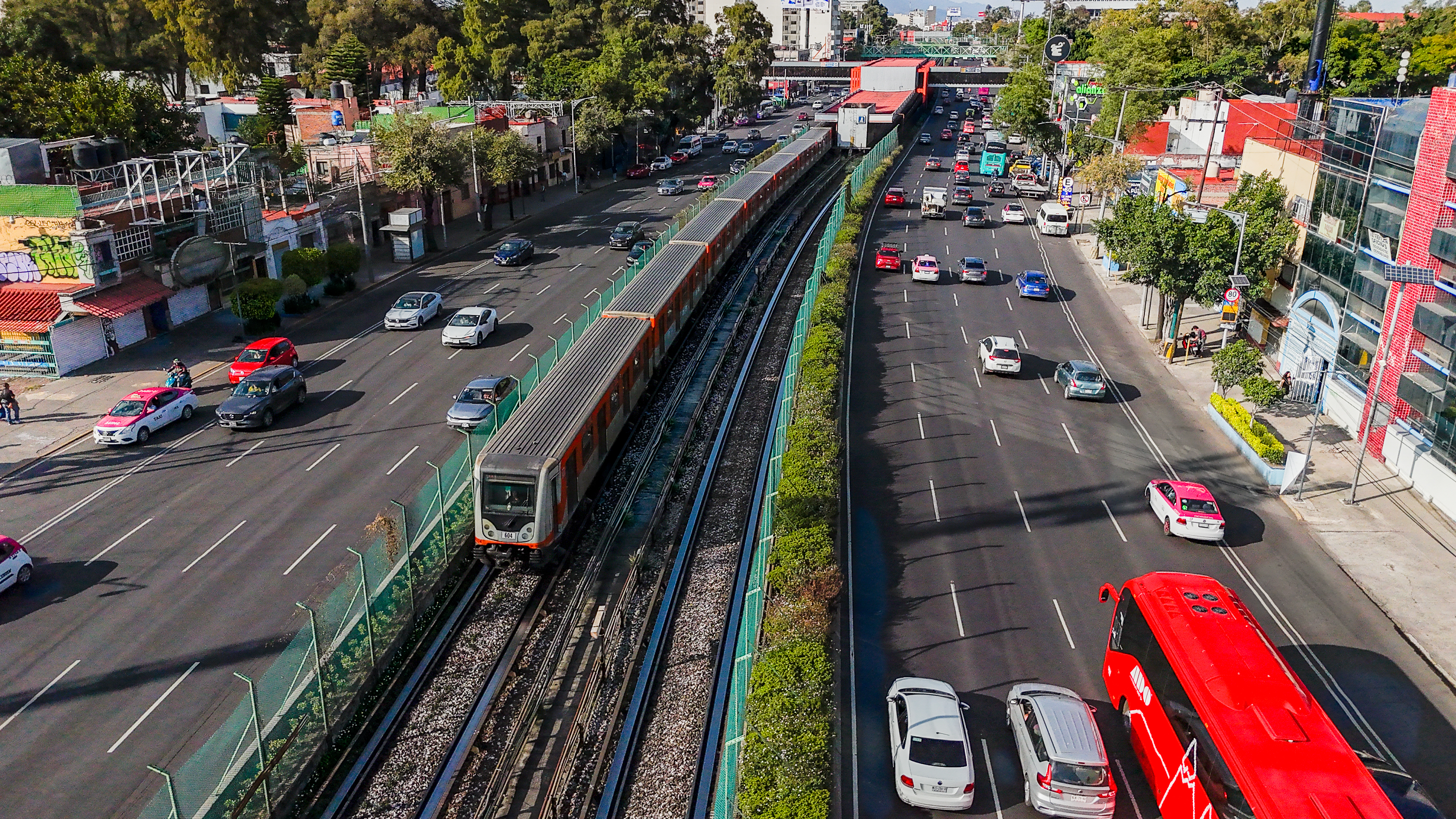
A metro departing Metro General Anaya to the south

== See also ==
- List of Mexico City metro stations
