= Viaducto metro station =

Mexico City metro station

Viaducto
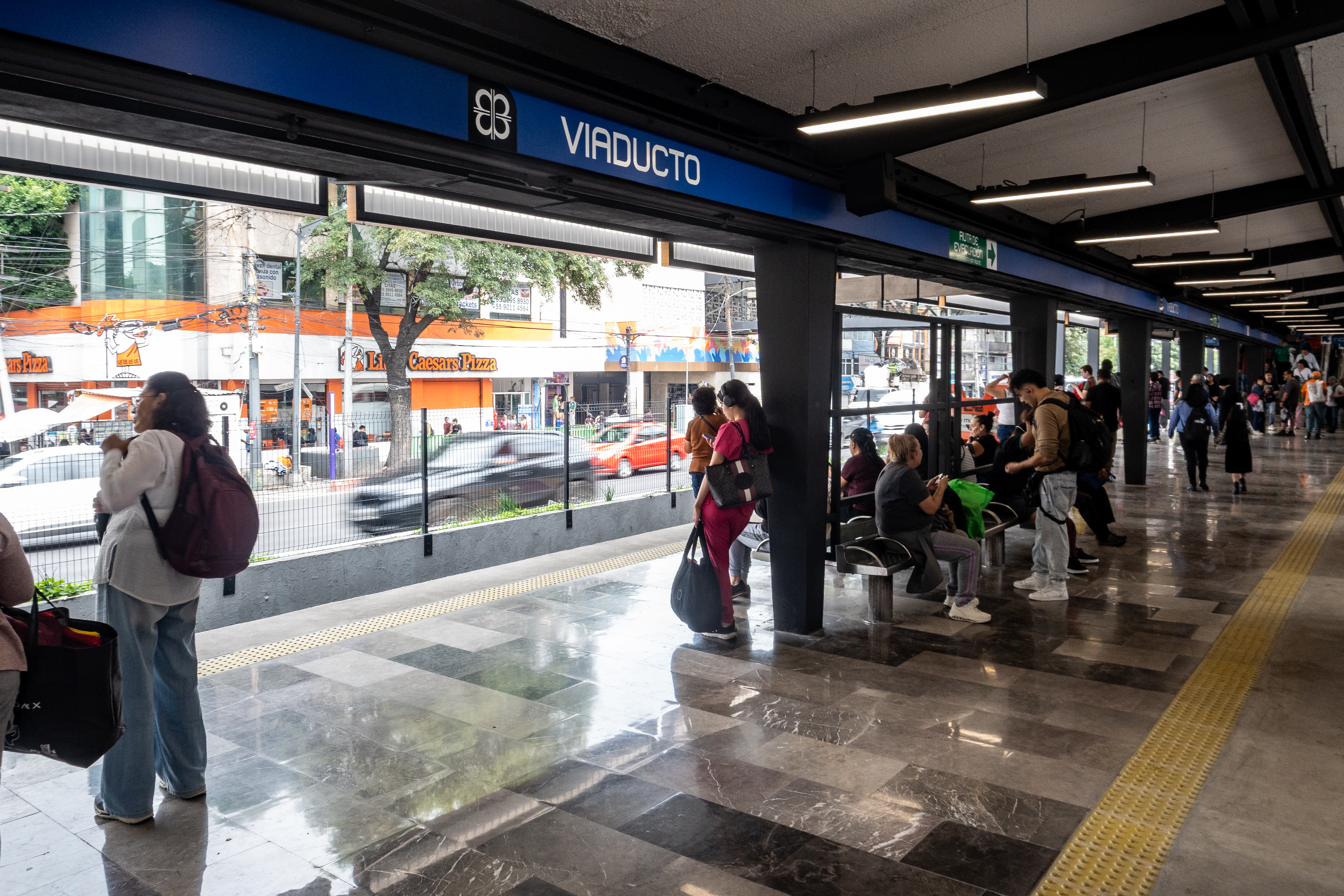
- Platform, 2026

General information
- Location: Calzada de Tlalpan; Mexico City; Mexico
- Coordinates: 19°24′03″N 99°08′13″W
- System: Mexico City Metro
- Platforms: 1 island platform
- Tracks: 2

Construction
- Structure type: At grade
- Platform levels: 1
- Parking: No
- Cycle facilities: No
- Accessible: No

Other information
- Status: In service

History
- Opened: 1 August 1970; 56 years ago

Passengers
- 2025: 5,380,141 (Note: The data here is limited to the most recent ten years to avoid excessive listings; earlier figures can be found in this page's history or on the Mexico City Metro website. To calculate the average daily ridership, the annual total is divided by 365 days (366 in leap years), with decimals omitted from the result. Each station per line is ranked individually, as the system counts transfer stations separately. The percentage change is calculated automatically using the data from the current year and the previous year.) ▼0.98%
- Rank: 95/195

Services
Preceding station	Mexico City Metro	Following station
Chabacano toward Cuatro Caminos	Line 2	Xola toward Tasqueña
Route map
Location
- Location within Mexico City
- Area map

Viaducto is a station on Line 2 of the Mexico City Metro system. It is located in the border of Benito Juárez and Iztacalco boroughs of Mexico City, south of the city centre on Calzada de Tlalpan. It is a surface station.

== General information ==
It is represented by the stylised logo of a cloverleaf interchange, which represents crossing of Calzada de Tlalpan (a former Aztec road) and Viaducto Miguel Alemán, a crosscutting freeway that runs across the middle of the Federal District which opened in September 1950. The station was opened on 1 August 1970.

=== Ridership ===
Annual passenger ridership
Year	Ridership	Average daily	Rank	% change	Ref.
2025	5,380,141	14,740	95/195	−0.98%
2024	5,433,299	14,845	83/195	+26.62%
2023	4,290,859	11,755	108/195	−0.52%
2022	4,313,392	11,817	100/195	+31.21%
2021	3,287,377	9,006	97/195	−22.77%
2020	4,256,619	11,630	84/195	−43.58%
2019	7,543,940	20,668	85/195	−2.20%
2018	7,713,645	21,133	85/195	+1.61%
2017	7,591,103	20,797	84/195	−0.08%
2016	7,597,169	20,757	87/195	−1.48%

== Train crash ==
On October 20, 1975, at about 09:40 local time (15:40 GMT), two trains crashed, while both were going towards Tasqueña station. The first was parked at Viaducto station picking up passengers when it was hit by another train that did not stop in time. According to official reports, from 31 to 39 people died, and between 71 and 119 were injured. To date, it is the worst railroad accident recorded in the Mexico City Metro. The driver, Carlos Fernández, was found guilty and sentenced to 12 years in prison. After the crash, automatic traffic lights were incorporated to all lines.

== Exits ==
- East: Calzada de Tlalpan between Coruña street and Calzada Santa Anita, Colonia Viaducto Piedad
- West: Calzada de Tlalpan between Coruña street and Segovia street, Colonia Álamos

== See also ==
- List of Mexico City metro stations
- 2020 Mexico City Metro train crash
- 2023 Mexico City Metro train crash
