= Xola metro station =

Mexico City metro station

Xola
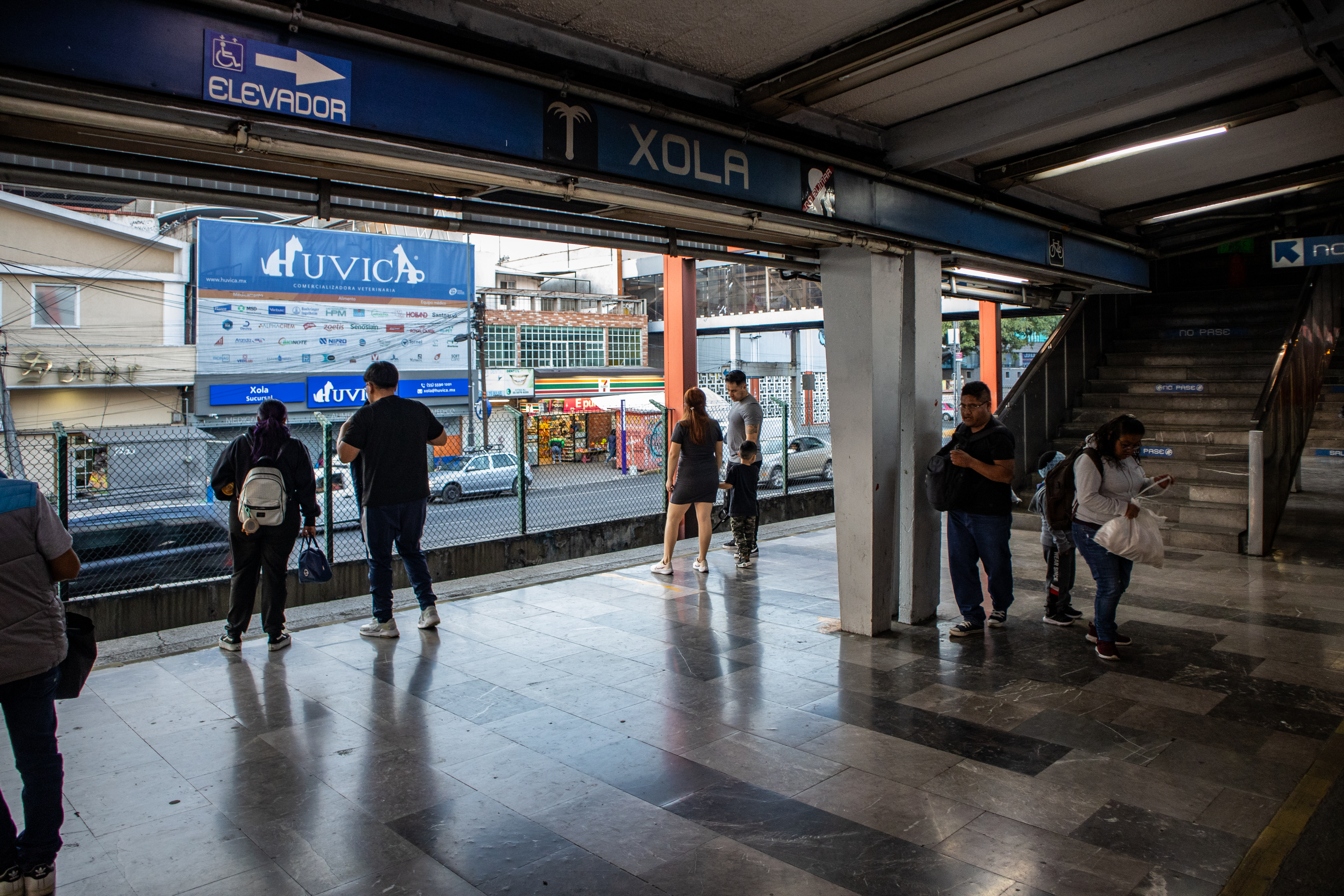
- Metro Xola plattforms

General information
- Location: Calzada de Tlalpan; Benito Juárez; Mexico City; Mexico
- Coordinates: 19°23′43″N 99°08′16″W
- System: Mexico City Metro
- Platforms: 1 island platform
- Tracks: 2
- Connections: Xola

Construction
- Structure type: At grade
- Platform levels: 1
- Parking: No
- Cycle facilities: No
- Accessible: Yes

Other information
- Status: In service

History
- Opened: 1 August 1970; 56 years ago

Passengers
- 2025: 6,274,810 (Note: The data here is limited to the most recent ten years to avoid excessive listings; earlier figures can be found in this page's history or on the Mexico City Metro website. To calculate the average daily ridership, the annual total is divided by 365 days (366 in leap years), with decimals omitted from the result. Each station per line is ranked individually, as the system counts transfer stations separately. The percentage change is calculated automatically using the data from the current year and the previous year.) ▼2.78%
- Rank: 71/195

Services
Preceding station	Mexico City Metro	Following station
Viaducto toward Cuatro Caminos	Line 2	Villa de Cortés toward Tasqueña
Route map
Location
- Location within Mexico City
- Area map

Xola (Spanish pronunciation: [ʃo.la]) is a station on Line 2 of the Mexico City Metro system. It is located in the Colonia Moderna and Colonia Alamos districts of the Benito Juárez borough of Mexico City, directly south of the city centre on Calzada de Tlalpan. It is a surface station.

== General information ==
The station logo shows a coconut palm tree. The name comes from the 19th century "Xola" hacienda that existed in the current site of the station. The hacienda housed an enormous specimen of coconut palm tree, of which some still stand on the sidewalk of the nearby Xola Avenue. The station opened on 1 August 1970.

=== Ridership ===
Annual passenger ridership
Year	Ridership	Average daily	Rank	% change	Ref.
2025	6,274,810	17,191	71/195	−2.78%
2024	6,454,326	17,634	64/195	+7.53%
2023	6,002,611	16,445	76/195	+15.18%
2022	5,211,609	14,278	83/195	+59.50%
2021	3,267,474	8,951	100/195	−22.96%
2020	4,241,010	11,587	85/195	−47.94%
2019	8,146,220	22,318	73/195	+1.35%
2018	8,037,593	22,020	75/195	+4.41%
2017	7,698,179	21,090	79/195	−1.12%
2016	7,785,715	21,272	84/195	−2.13%

== Exits ==
- East: Calzada de Tlalpan between Juana de Arco street and Napoleón street, Colonia Moderna
- West: Calzada de Tlalpan between Toledo street and Xola, Colonia Álamos

== See also ==
- List of Mexico City metro stations
