= Cuitláhuac metro station =

Mexico City metro station

Cuitláhuac
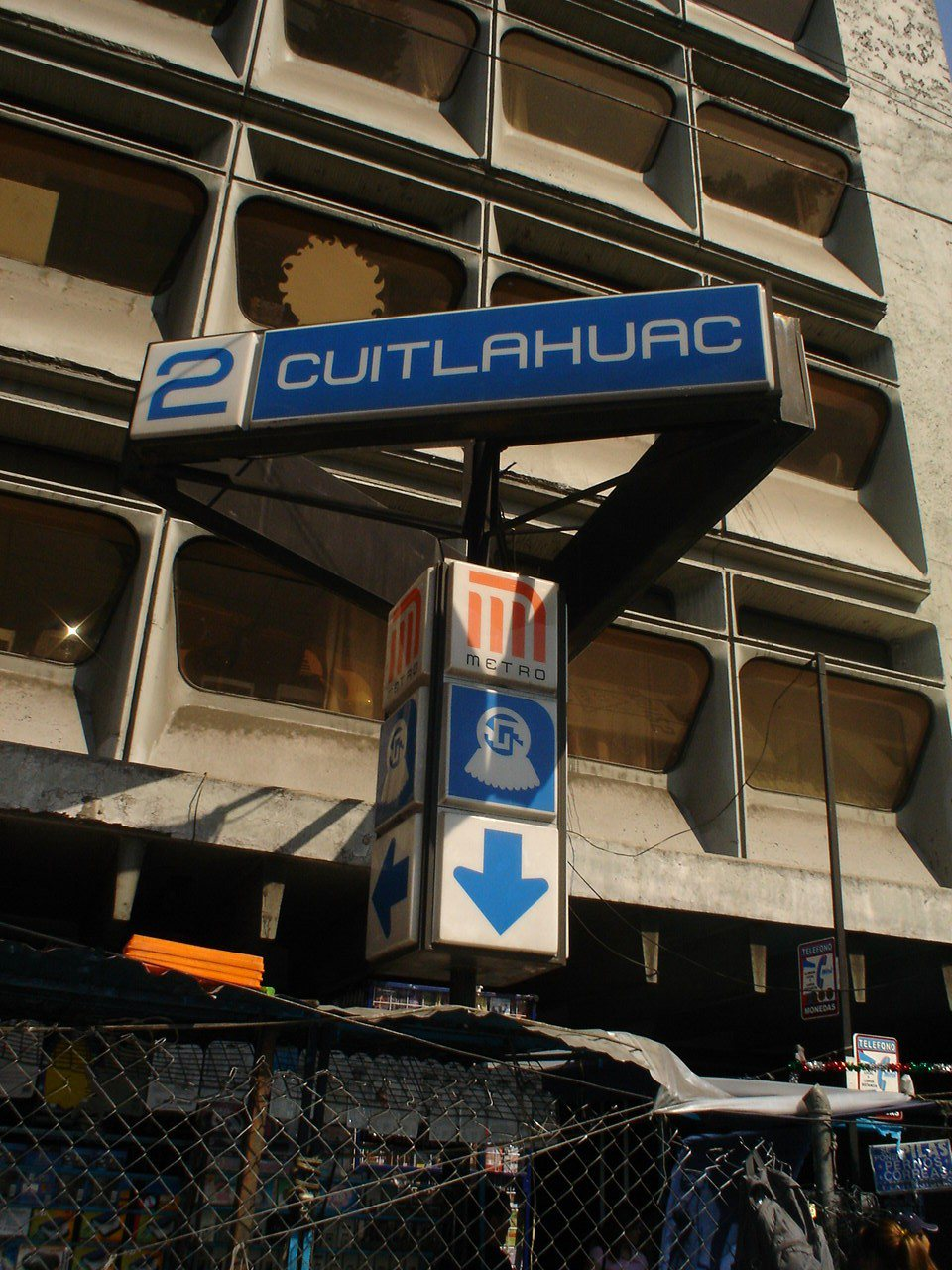

General information
- Location: Calzada México-Tacuba; Popotla, Miguel Hidalgo; Mexico City; Mexico
- Coordinates: 19°27′27″N 99°10′55″W
- System: Mexico City Metro
- Platforms: 2 side platforms
- Tracks: 2

Construction
- Structure type: Underground

History
- Opened: 14 September 1970; 55 years ago

Passengers
- 2025: 4,846,998 (Note: The data here is limited to the most recent ten years to avoid excessive listings; earlier figures can be found in this page's history or on the Mexico City Metro website. To calculate the average daily ridership, the annual total is divided by 365 days (366 in leap years), with decimals omitted from the result. Each station per line is ranked individually, as the system counts transfer stations separately. The percentage change is calculated automatically using the data from the current year and the previous year.) ▲0.33%
- Rank: 106/195

Services
Preceding station	Mexico City Metro	Following station
Tacuba toward Cuatro Caminos	Line 2	Popotla toward Tasqueña
Route map
Location
- Location within Mexico City
- Area map

Cuitláhuac is a station on the Mexico City Metro. It is located in the Colonia Popotla and Colonia San Álvaro districts in the Miguel Hidalgo borough of Mexico City, to the northwest of the city center. It lies along Line 2. In 2019, the station had an average ridership of 18,615 passengers per day.

== Name and pictogram ==
The station's name comes from nearby Avenida Cuitláhuac, an avenue named in honor of Cultlahuanctzin (whose name was later changed into Spanish language as "Cuitláhuac"). He was the tenth, and penultimate, Aztec emperor and the one who defeated Hernán Cortés in the Battle of La Noche Triste ("Sad Night") in 1520. The station pictogram depicts an Aztec battle shield.

== General information ==
The station was opened on 14 September 1970 as part of the second stretch of Line 2, from Pino Suárez to Tacuba.

Metro Cuitláhuac is also close to Avenida México-Tacuba, one of the most important avenues in the city built on the former route of one of Tenochtitlán's three main avenues into the mainland. The station also connects with trolleybus Line "I", which runs between Metro El Rosario and Metro Chapultepec.

The station serves the Popotla and San Álvaro neighborhoods.

=== Ridership ===
Annual passenger ridership
Year	Ridership	Average daily	Rank	% change	Ref.
2025	4,846,998	13,279	106/195	+0.33%
2024	4,831,060	13,199	102/195	−7.89%
2023	5,244,830	14,369	88/195	+10.41%
2022	4,750,532	13,015	90/195	+47.85%
2021	3,213,123	8,803	103/195	−15.37%
2020	3,796,707	10,373	96/195	−44.12%
2019	6,794,715	18,615	95/195	−0.36%
2018	6,819,391	18,863	92/195	+1.30%
2017	6,732,158	18,444	92/195	−3.97%
2016	7,010,603	19,154	90/195	−1.31%

== Exits ==
- South: Calzada México-Tacuba and Avenida Cuitláhuac, Popotla
- North: Calzada México-Tacuba and Avenida Cuitláhuac, Colonia San Álvaro
