= Tacuba metro station =

Mexico City metro station

Tacuba
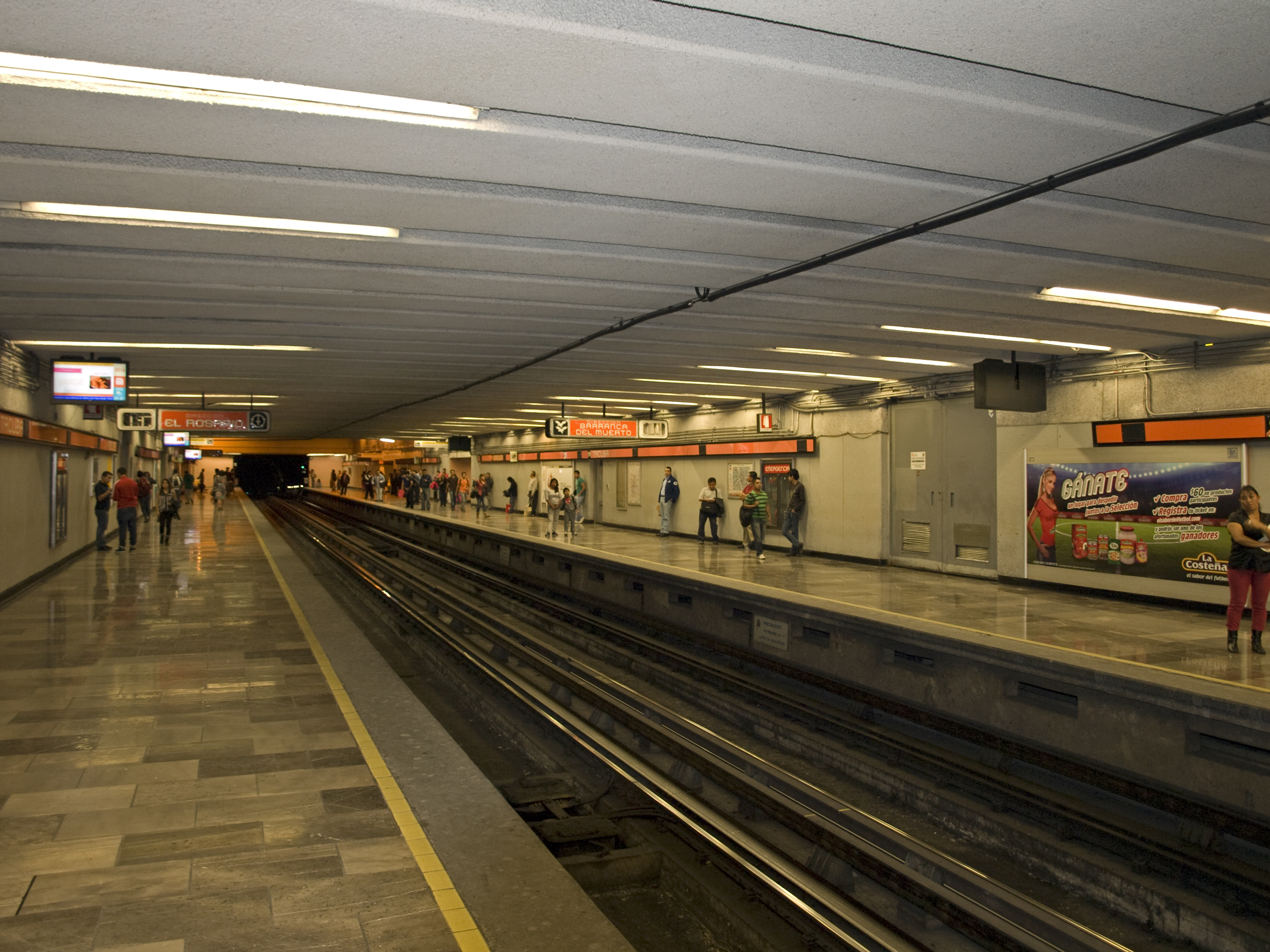
- Line 7 station platforms

General information
- Location: Tacuba, Miguel Hidalgo; Mexico City; Mexico
- Coordinates: 19°27′34″N 99°11′21″W
- System: Mexico City Metro
- Platforms: 4 side platforms
- Tracks: 4

Construction
- Structure type: Underground
- Platform levels: 1
- Parking: No
- Cycle facilities: Yes
- Accessible: Yes

History
- Opened: 14 September 1970; 55 years ago 20 December 1984; 41 years ago

Passengers
- 2025: Total: 13,174,827; 10,580,060 (Note: The data here is limited to the most recent ten years to avoid excessive listings; earlier figures can be found in this page's history or on the Mexico City Metro website. To calculate the average daily ridership, the annual total is divided by 365 days (366 in leap years), with decimals omitted from the result. Each station per line is ranked individually, as the system counts transfer stations separately. The percentage change is calculated automatically using the data from the current year and the previous year.); 2,476,878 ▲1.29%
- Rank: 27/195; 162/195

Services
Preceding station	Mexico City Metro	Following station
Panteones toward Cuatro Caminos	Line 2	Cuitláhuac toward Tasqueña
Refinería toward El Rosario	Line 7	San Joaquín toward Barranca del Muerto
Route map
Location
- Location within Mexico City
- Area map

Tacuba is a station of the Mexico City Metro. It is located in the Tacuba district of the Miguel Hidalgo borough, to the west of downtown Mexico City. It lies along Lines 2 and 7.

The station logo depicts three flowers, as its name comes from the Nahuatl language word tlacopan, that which means "land of flowers". It refers to the ancient Tepanec kingdom of Tlacopan that existed in the area in pre-Columbian times.

This transfer station was previously the terminal for Metro Line 2 and opened for service along that line on 14 September 1970. Service was extended westward along Line 2 from Tacuba to Panteones and Cuatro Caminos on 22 August 1984. Line 7 opened up through Tacuba on 20 December 1984. The station transfers not only to Line 7 but also to a nearby mini-bus base, which serves boroughs Azcapotzalco and Miguel Hidalgo. Within the station facilities there is a cultural display and an information desk.

== Ridership ==
Annual passenger ridership (Line 2)
Year	Ridership	Average daily	Rank	% change	Ref.
2025	10,580,060	28,986	27/195	−0.89%
2024	10,674,781	29,166	24/195	+2.81%
2023	10,382,962	28,446	23/195	+10.39%
2022	9,405,769	25,769	21/195	+34.48%
2021	6,994,297	19,162	26/195	−9.32%
2020	7,713,207	21,074	23/195	−36.16%
2019	12,081,287	33,099	35/195	+1.52%
2018	11,900,680	32,604	33/195	−6.17%
2017	12,683,462	34,749	27/195	−6.69%
2016	13,592,650	37,138	25/195	−2.53%

Annual passenger ridership (Line 7)
Year	Ridership	Average daily	Rank	% change	Ref.
2025	2,594,767	7,108	162/195	+3.03%
2024	2,518,411	6,880	153/195	−4.01%
2023	2,623,681	7,188	138/195	+5.93%
2022	2,476,878	6,785	142/195	+19.00%
2021	2,081,340	5,702	138/195	+28.91%
2020	1,614,531	4,411	162/195	−49.12%
2019	3,173,516	8,694	160/195	+0.62%
2018	3,153,828	8,640	161/195	+7.40%
2017	2,936,455	8,045	165/195	−1.91%
2016	2,993,642	8,179	164/195	+5.01%

== Nearby ==
- Mercado Tacuba, market

== Exits ==
=== Line 2 ===
- North: Calzada México-Tacuba, Tacuba

=== Line 7 ===
- East: Calzada México-Tacuba and Golfo de Bengala, Tacuba
- West: Golfo de México and Golfo de Bengala, Tacuba

== See also ==
- List of Mexico City metro stations
