= Indios Verdes (disambiguation) =

Indios Verdes commonly refers to Indios Verdes metro station, a station located in Gustavo A. Madero, northern Mexico City.

Indios Verdes may also refer to:

- Monumento a los Indios Verdes, two statues located in Gustavo A. Madero, northern Mexico City
- Cablebús Indios Verdes, an aerial lift station; opened in 2021
- Metrobús Indios Verdes (Line 1), a BRT station; opened in 2005
- Metrobús Indios Verdes (Line 3), a BRT station; in service since 2021
- Metrobús Indios Verdes (Line 7), a BRT station; opened in 2018
- Mexibús Indios Verdes, a BRT station; opened in 2021
- Mexicable Indios Verdes, an aerial lift station; opened in 2023
