= Grupo Editorial Miguel Ángel Porrúa =

Mexican publishing house

- Founded: 1978; 47 years ago
- Founder: Miguel Ángel Porrúa Venero
- Country of origin: Mexico
- Headquarters location: Amargura No. 4, Mexico City
- Key people: Verónica Santos Monter, Aldonza Porrúa Bueno

Grupo Editorial Miguel Ángel Porrúa (MAPorrua) is a Mexican publishing house founded by Miguel Ángel Porrúa Venero in 1978.

== History ==
The concern named Miguel Ángel Porrúa librero-editor (bookseller-publisher) [stylized in lowercase], was founded in 1978 by Miguel Ángel Porrúa Venero initially at Donceles No. 63 in Mexico City's historic downtown district. In 1980 the company emigrated to the south of the city, and in 1984 it finally settled at Amargura No. 4, San Ángel, Borough Álvaro Obregón, 01000 Mexico City. It is a publisher in Mexico that is dedicated to the edition, printing and publication of academic, literary and scientific books.

The Grupo Editorial Miguel Ángel Porrúa was created in 1980, and in 1987 the company established itself at Chihuahua No. 23, Colonia Progreso, San Ángel, Borough Álvaro Obregón, 01080 Mexico City. The publishing house has its own typography, photomechanics and printing workshops.

The Miguel Ángel Porrúa publishing house has stood out for publishing works from various fields, including history, literature, philosophy, social sciences, natural sciences. Its catalog includes both works by national and international authors.

Through co-editions with tens of higher education institutions in Mexico, it has established several collections that cover various areas such as education, environment, sociology, history, law, economics, business administration, art, democracy, philosophy, politics and government, public policy, migration, and literature, among others. MAPorrúa has a line dedicated to children and young people, too.

As to universities and other institutions, MAPorrúa has endorsed the difficulties that the distribution of the works dealing with the results of their own research implies for these organizations, so the distribution of the works is directed from the bookstores of this publisher.

MAPorrúa has also a bookstore at Local number 13 of Un Paseo por los Libros (A Walk Through the Books), in the Zócalo-Pino Suárez passage of the Mexico City Metro. Its operation expands towards a circuit that includes Mexican bookstores, as well as distribution in the United States, Spain, and Latin America.

Of great importance is the rescue of documents and facsimile publications aimed at disseminating knowledge about Mexico, as well as special editions, profusely illustrated art and history books. Currently, the collection of Grupo Editorial Miguel Ángel Porrúa has about 4000 published titles.
