= Monumento a los Indios Verdes =

Monument in Mexico City

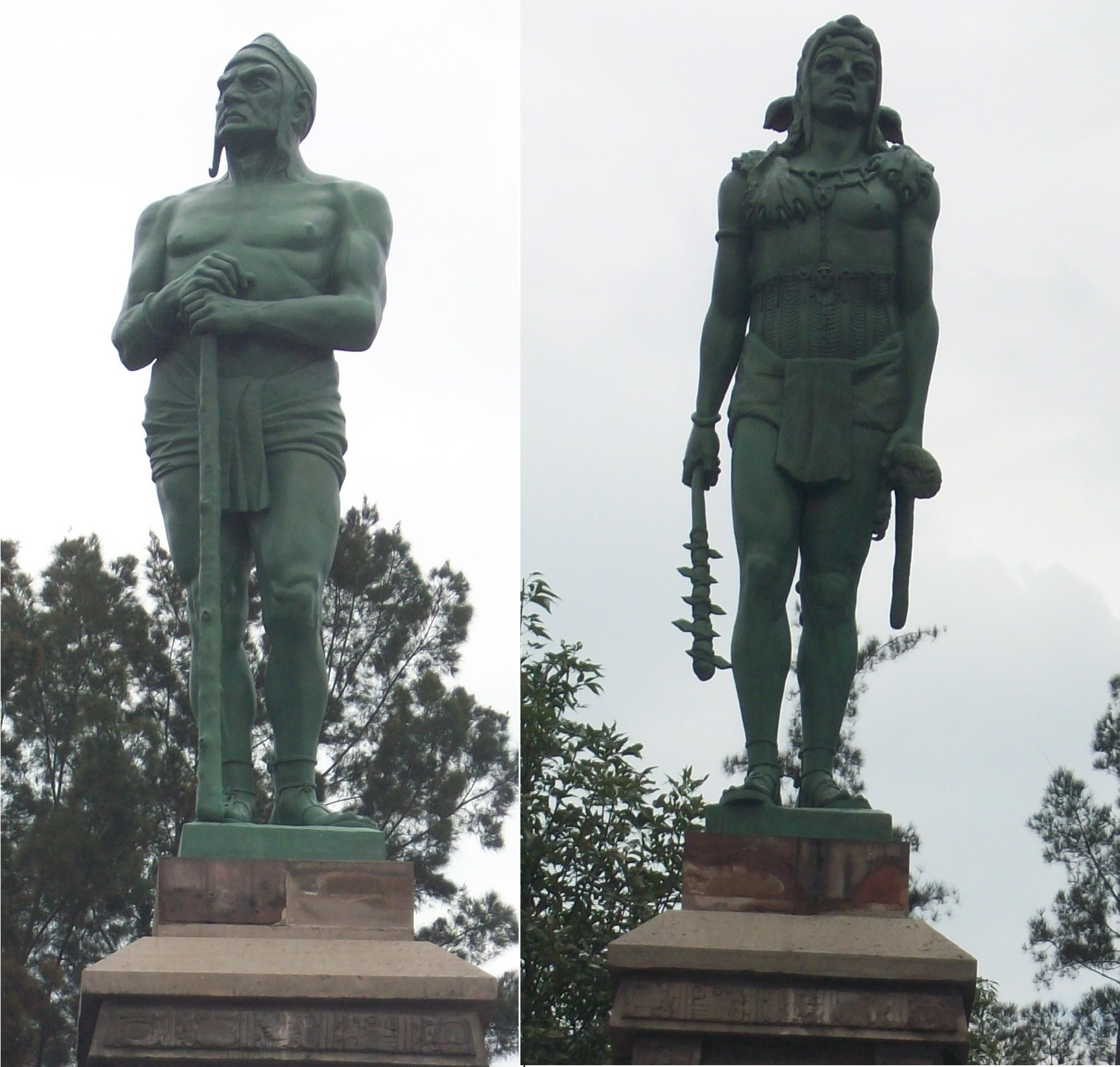
- Ahuizotl (left) and Itzcoatl (right)
- Interactive map of Monumento a los Indios Verdes
- Location: Mexico City, Mexico
- Coordinates: 19°29′29″N 99°7′9″W
- Designer: Alejandro Casarín
- Type: Sculptures
- Material: Bronze
- Height: 3 m (9.8 ft) to 4 m (13 ft)
- Weight: 3 t (3.0 long tons; 3.3 short tons)
- Opening date: September 1891
- Restored date: 1939, 1979, 2005

Statues of Tlatoque (Nahuatl for Aztec rulers) Ahuitzotl and Itzcoatl are installed in Mexico City. They are collectively known as the Monumento a los Indios Verdes (lit. transl. "Monument to the Green Indians"). The statues are verdigris due to the effects of weather. They are around 3 meters (9.8 ft) to 4 meters (13 ft) tall and their plinths have inscriptions in Nahuatl. The statues were created by Alejandro Casarín to represent Mexico at the 1889 Paris Exposition.

The statues were unveiled in 1891 in front of the equestrian statue of Charles IV of Spain along Paseo de la Reforma. Since then, they have been moved to Calzada de la Viga, to the northern section of Avenida de los Insurgentes, and since 2005 they are found in Mestizaje Park, in Gustavo A. Madero borough.

Thanks to the statues, the zone between Deportivo 18 de Marzo metro station and the beginning of the Mexican Federal Highway 85D (Mexico City–Pachuca section) is known as "Indios Verdes".

== Ahuitzotl and Itzcoatl ==
Itzcoatl was the son of Acamapichtli. He served as the fourth Huey Tlatoani of Tenochtitlan and he was the first emperor of the Aztec Empire, ruling from 1427 to his death in 1440. He was the father of Tezozomoc.

Ahuitzotl was the grandson of Moctezuma I (on his mother's side) and Itzcoatl (on his father's side), as well as the son of Tezozomoc and Atotoztli II. Ahuizotl served as the eighth Huey Tlatoani of Tenochtitlan and the sixth ruler of the Aztec Empire, ruling from 1486 to his death in 1502. He was the father of the last ruler of Tenochtitlan, Cuauhtémoc.

== History and description ==
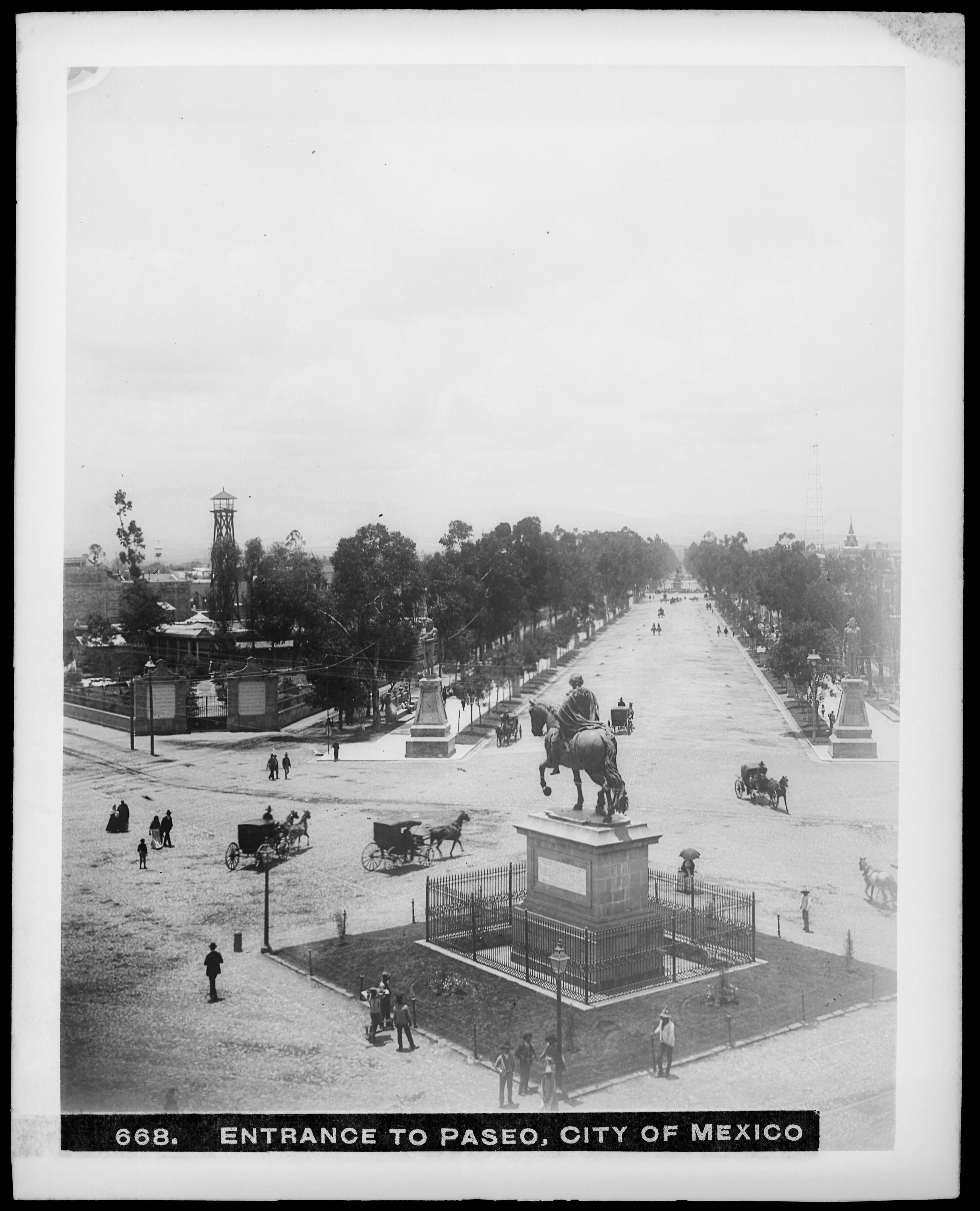
The statues installed along Paseo de la Reforma (c. 1900), opposite to the equestrian statue of Charles IV of Spain

Antonio Peñafiel and Antonio Anza were asked by the Ministry of Promotion of Mexico to represent the country at the 1889 Paris Exposition. The project resulted in the creation of the Aztec Palace. Among the symbols created for it, there were two bronze sculptures created by Alejandro Casarín Salinas, one of Ahuitzotl and the other of Itzcoatl. They are around 3 meters (10 ft) to 4 meters (13 ft) tall and weigh around 3 metric tons (3.0 long tons; 3.3 short tons). The reason why Ahuitzotl and Itzcoatl were selected to have statues while other rulers were represented with reliefs is unknown.

The statues, however, were not displayed at the event and instead they were placed along Paseo de la Reforma Avenue, in Mexico City, in September 1891. The installation was never well-received as the style of the avenue was inspired by that of Europe. By 1902 the statues were moved to the Calzada de la Viga, next to the Canal de la Viga (Viga Canal). In 1920, the government piped the canal and by 1939 the sculptures were moved to the northern section of Avenida de los Insurgentes, the main northern entrance to the city. The statues remained there until 1979 due to the construction of a Mexico City Metro station that was later named after them. They were placed in an area next to the station, but in 2005 they were relocated again due to the construction of a bus rapid transit station. Since then, the monument stands in Parque del Mestizaje (Mestizaje Park).

Due to the aging process and exposure to saline water and the sun, the statues have turned verdigris. They still stand on their original plinths, which have inscriptions in Nahuatl.

Thanks to the statues, the zone between Deportivo 18 de Marzo metro station and the beginning of the Mexican Federal Highway 85D (Mexico City–Pachuca section) is known as "Indios Verdes". Because of this, the statues are not moved away from the area even though there have been requests to return them to their original place. In January 2021, the National Institute of Anthropology and History (INAH) proposed moving the statues back to the Paseo de la Reforma. "The transfer means a reading of the urban space, recovering the historical discourse that gave rise to the formation of a set of monuments and roundabouts on Paseo de la Reforma, conceived at the end of the 19th century, with the idea of honoring the Reformation, a great transformation that it meant for Mexico, but to recover a historical reading that began precisely by underlining the Mexican splendor and the importance of the pre-Hispanic or Mesoamerican antecedents of our country", said Diego Prieto, director of INAH.

For historian Dalia Argüello Nevado, arguing that the monuments should return to their original site with comments that Paseo de la Reforma would dignify them in a better way denotes in itself a form of racism against the inhabitants of the north of the city.

== Reception ==
After their installation, the statues received derogatory commentary. In an article written for the newspaper El Tiempo, a columnist called them "the Aztec Mummies of Paseo", further saying that it contrasted with the "magnificent" equestrian statue of Charles IV of Spain by Manuel Tolsá formerly located in front of them. A columnist from El Universal wrote that supporters of the On the Origin of Species work by Charles Darwin would think they "are more human than a gorilla". Monitor Republicano labeled them as "big dolls" and said that tourists would think that "these eyesores" were created by the settlers of Anahuac, and that the government preserved them as "archaeological relics". The writer concluded that although these were favorable comments, those who realized that they were actually recent works would judge the citizens as "savages". Other comments said it would have been better to use their materials in candlesticks and pennies instead.

Other criticisms they received were due to anachronistic issues such as proportions that do not resemble reality or that they are holding weapons from another era. One journalist said that the "proportions of the limbs sin against anatomical laws".

== Gallery ==
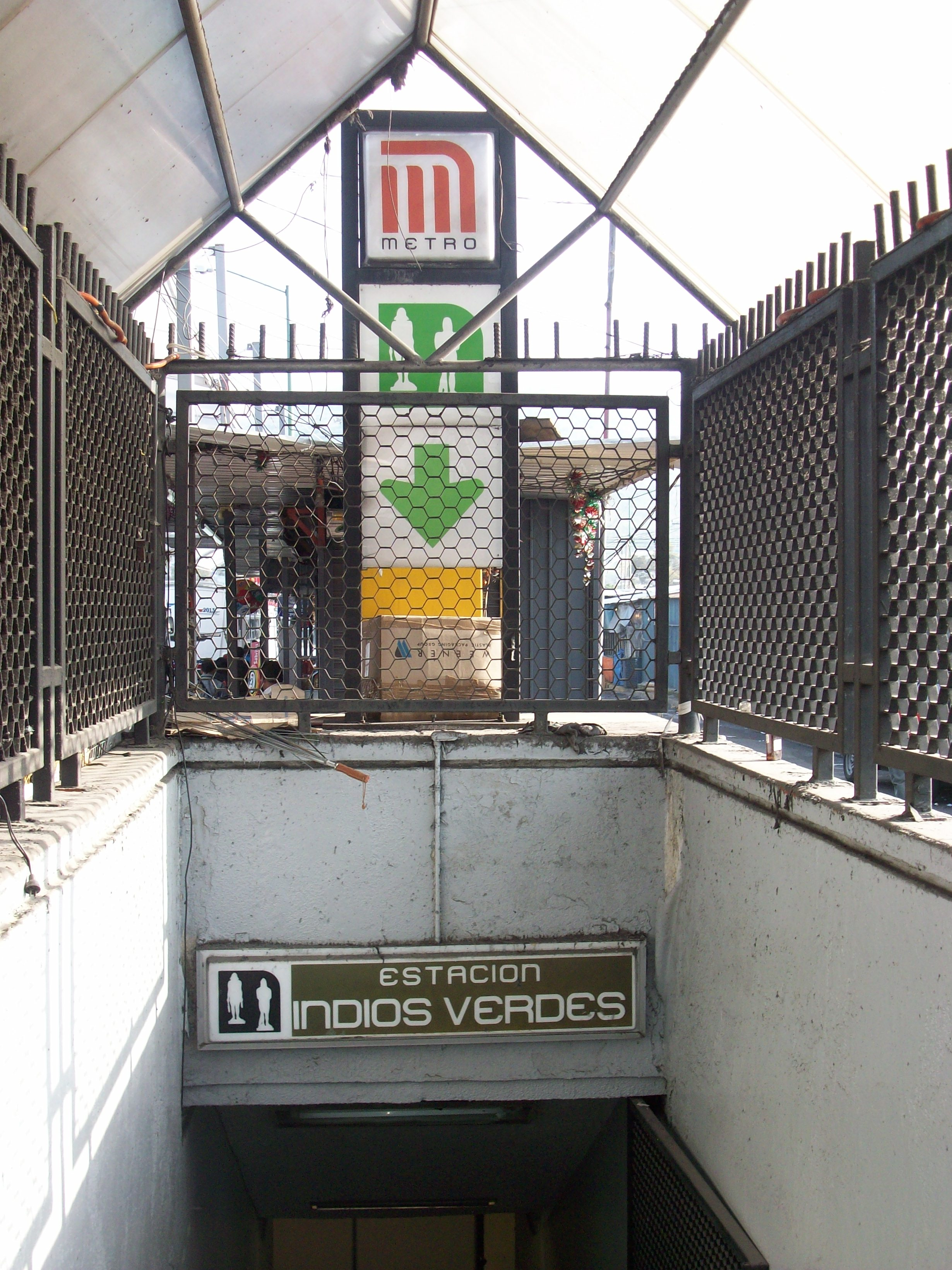
Indios Verdes metro station is named after the monument and its pictogram features the silhouettes of the sculptures (sign pictured)

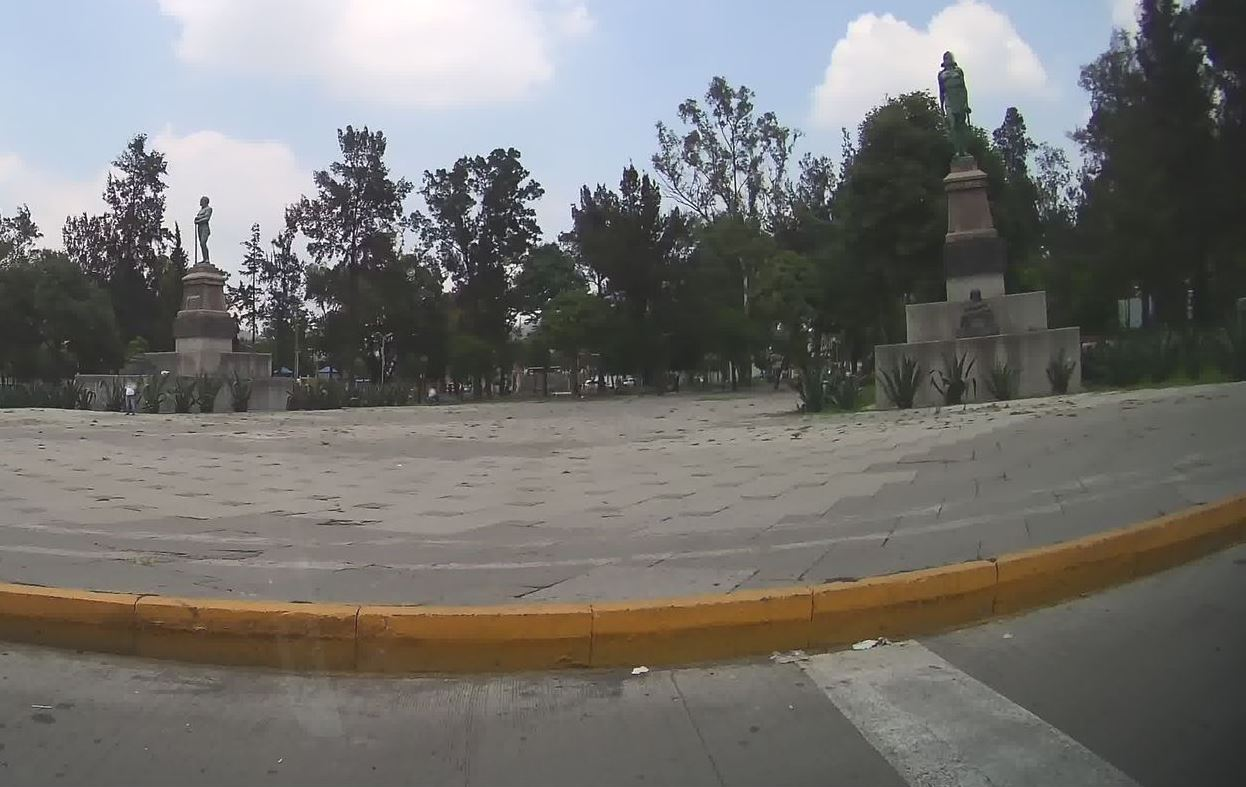
The monuments in 2020

== See also ==
- Indigenismo in Mexico
- Monumento a la Raza (Mexico City), a monument featuring multiple castings created for the 1889 Paris Exposition.
- Porfiriato, the era when the statues where created.
