= Indios Verdes metro station =

Mexico City Metro station

Indios Verdes
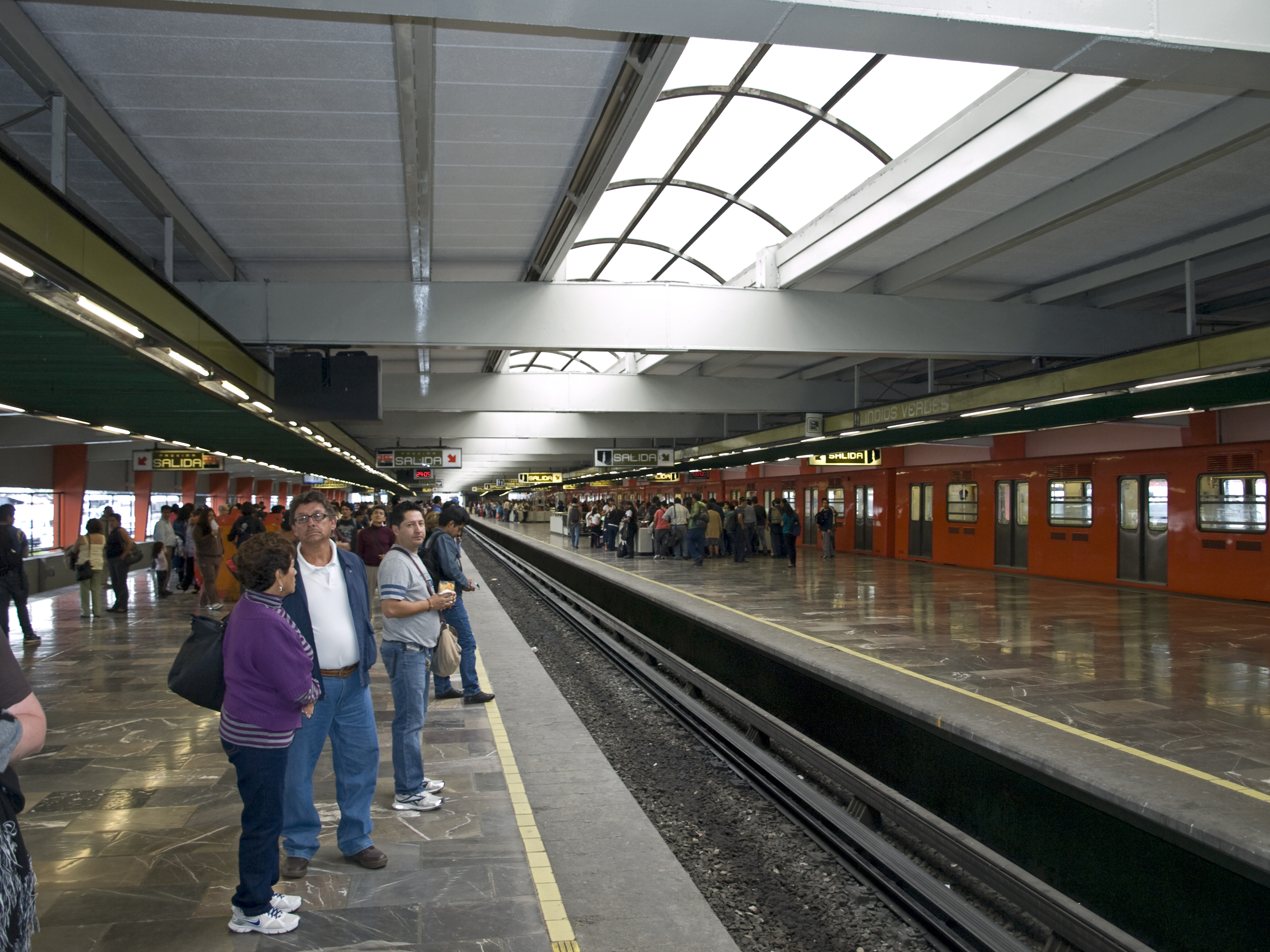
- Platforms in 2014

General information
- Location: Avenida de los Insurgentes; Gustavo A. Madero, Mexico City; Mexico
- Coordinates: 19°29′43″N 99°07′10″W
- System: Mexico City Metro
- Owner: Government of Mexico City
- Operator: Sistema de Transporte Colectivo (STC)
- Platforms: 2 island platforms
- Tracks: 3
- Connections: Indios Verdes; Indios Verdes; Indios Verdes; Indios Verdes; Indios Verdes; Indios Verdes; Indios Verdes; Routes: 101, 101-A, 101-B, 101-D, 102, 107-B, 108; Various local and intercity service routes

Construction
- Structure type: At grade
- Accessible: Yes

Other information
- Status: In service

History
- Opened: 1 December 1979; 46 years ago

Passengers
- 2025: 32,192,712 (Note: The system's website counts only passenger entries into stations and does not include passengers passing through, transferring between lines, or exiting the station. The data here is limited to the most recent ten years to avoid excessive listings; earlier figures can be found in this page's history or on the Mexico City Metro website. To calculate the average daily ridership, the annual total is divided by 365 days (366 in leap years), with decimals omitted from the result. Each station per line is ranked individually, as the system counts transfer stations separately. The percentage change is calculated automatically using the data from the current year and the previous year.) ▲6.12%
- Rank: 3/195

Services
Preceding station	Mexico City Metro	Following station
Terminus	Line 3	Deportivo 18 de Marzo toward Universidad
Route map
Location
- Location within Mexico City
- Area map and station layout

Indios Verdes metro station (Note: Estación del Metro Indios Verdes. Spanish pronunciation: [ˈindjos ˈβeɾðes]. The name of the station literally means "Green Indians" in Spanish.) is a station of the Mexico City Metro in the city's borough of Gustavo A. Madero. Found along Avenida de los Insurgentes, it is an at-grade station with two island platforms serving as the northern terminus of Line 3 (Olive Line), followed by Deportivo 18 de Marzo metro station. Indios Verdes metro station was inaugurated on 1 December 1979, providing service south toward Hospital General metro station.

The area surrounding Indios Verdes metro station is a key point in northern Mexico City, connecting the city with the neighboring State of Mexico and serving more than one million people daily. Outside the metro station, there is a transportation hub serving multiple local and intercity bus and aerial lift routes. Indios Verdes metro station is consistently among the busiest stations in the Mexico City Metro. In 2025, it recorded an average daily ridership of 88,199 passenger entries, making it the system's third-busiest station. The station facilities offer accessibility for people with disabilities, including elevators, tactile paving, and braille signage plates.

The metro station services the colonias (neighborhoods) of Residencial Zacatenco and Santa Isabel Tola. The station and surrounding area are named after the verdigris statues of Itzcoatl and Ahuitzotl, both Aztec rulers. Located in the nearby Parque Mestizaje, these statues are collectively known as the Monumento a los Indios Verdes, and their silhouettes are depicted in the station's pictogram.

Indios Verdes metro station has several street vendors operating in the station hub, and the area often floods during the rainy season. Other minor incidents related to the track infrastructure have been reported at the station.

== Location and station layout ==
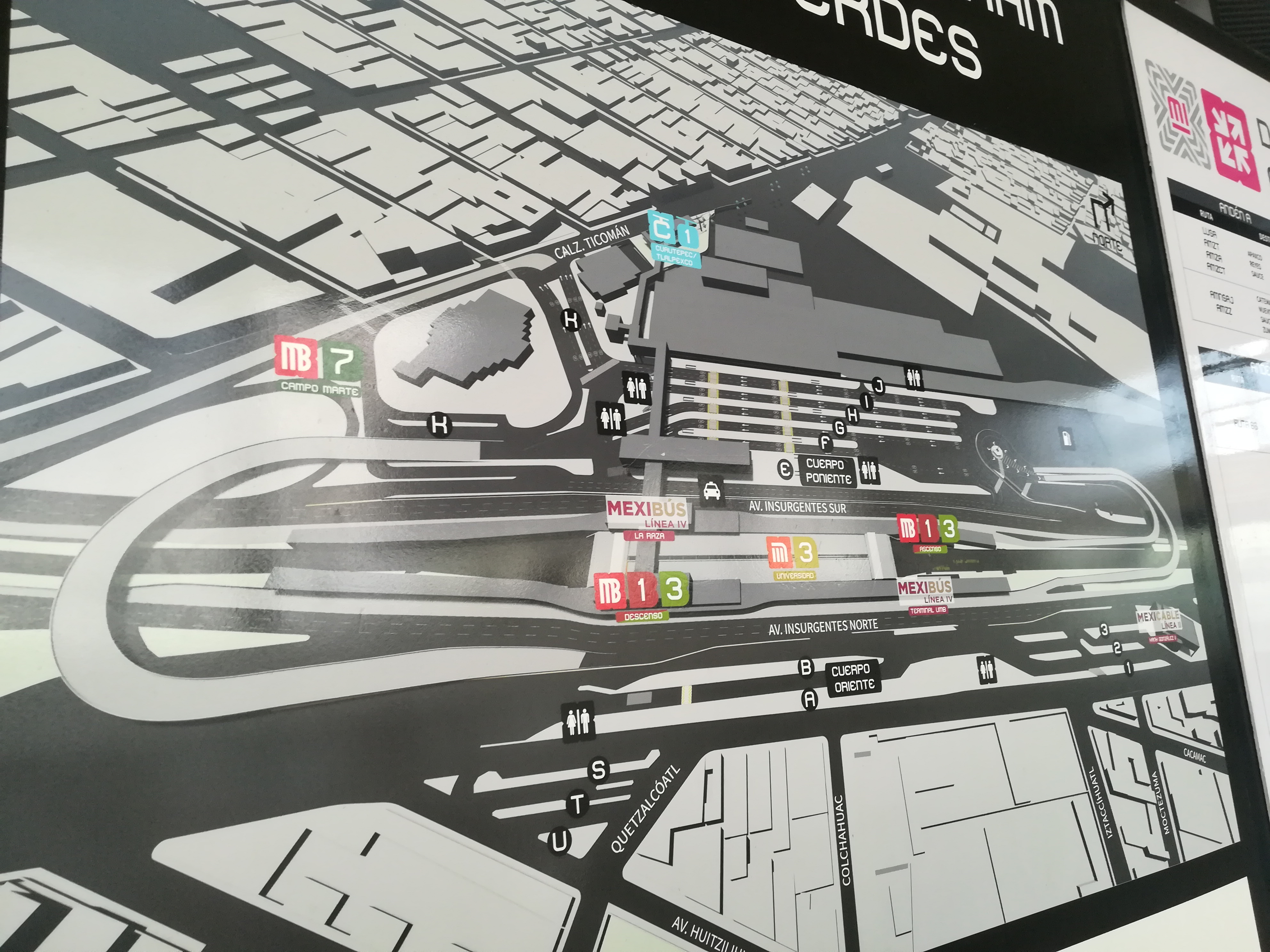
The CETRAM map as of 2024

Indios Verdes is an at-grade metro station on Line 3 along the median strip of Avenida de los Insurgentes, in the Colonias ("neighborhoods") of Residencial Zacatenco and Santa Isabel Tola, in the borough of Gustavo A. Madero, northern Mexico City.

The Indios Verdes area is a key point that connects Mexico City with the neighboring State of Mexico, serving more than one million people daily. The area surrounding the metro station has mixed land use, having shifted from primarily industrial to increasingly residential.

The metro station is serviced by a Centro de transferencia modal (CETRAM), a transportation hub covering 91,785 square meters (987,970 sq ft). The hub provides access to various routes and modes of transportation. The CETRAM facilities are accessible to people with disabilities and include elevators, escalators, and tactile paving.

Indios Verdes metro station has four exits leading to the CETRAM: one each to the northeast, northwest, southeast, and southwest. (Note: The metro website does not indicate there are southern exits.) The station offers a partially disabled-accessible service with tactile paving and braille signage plates. Within the system, Deportivo 18 de Marzo is the next station. The line's railyard and workshops, known as Ticomán, are located adjacent to Indios Verdes metro station.

Available transportation options include Lines 1, 3, and 7 of the Metrobús bus rapid transit (BRT) system; Line 4 of the Mexibús BRT system; Line 1 of the Cablebús aerial lift network; and Line 2 of the Mexicable aerial lift network. Local buses serving the area include Routes 101, 101-A, 101-B, 101-D, 102, 107-B, and 108 of the Red de Transporte de Pasajeros network. As of 2017, 28 pesero routes, consisting of buses and minibuses, also originated from various locations in the city and metropolitan area.

As of 2022, the transportation hub handled an estimated 1,400,000 daily passengers. Street stalls abound in the CETRAM, where commuters can purchase street food, clothing, accessories, flowers, gifts, and phone accessories. According to the vendors, there are about 1,000 stalls. Street vending has been a recurring issue for the city government, with inadequate surveillance and lighting in the area contributing to security concerns. Over the years, including in 2002 and 2016, the government has undertaken efforts to reorganize the CETRAM.

== History and construction ==
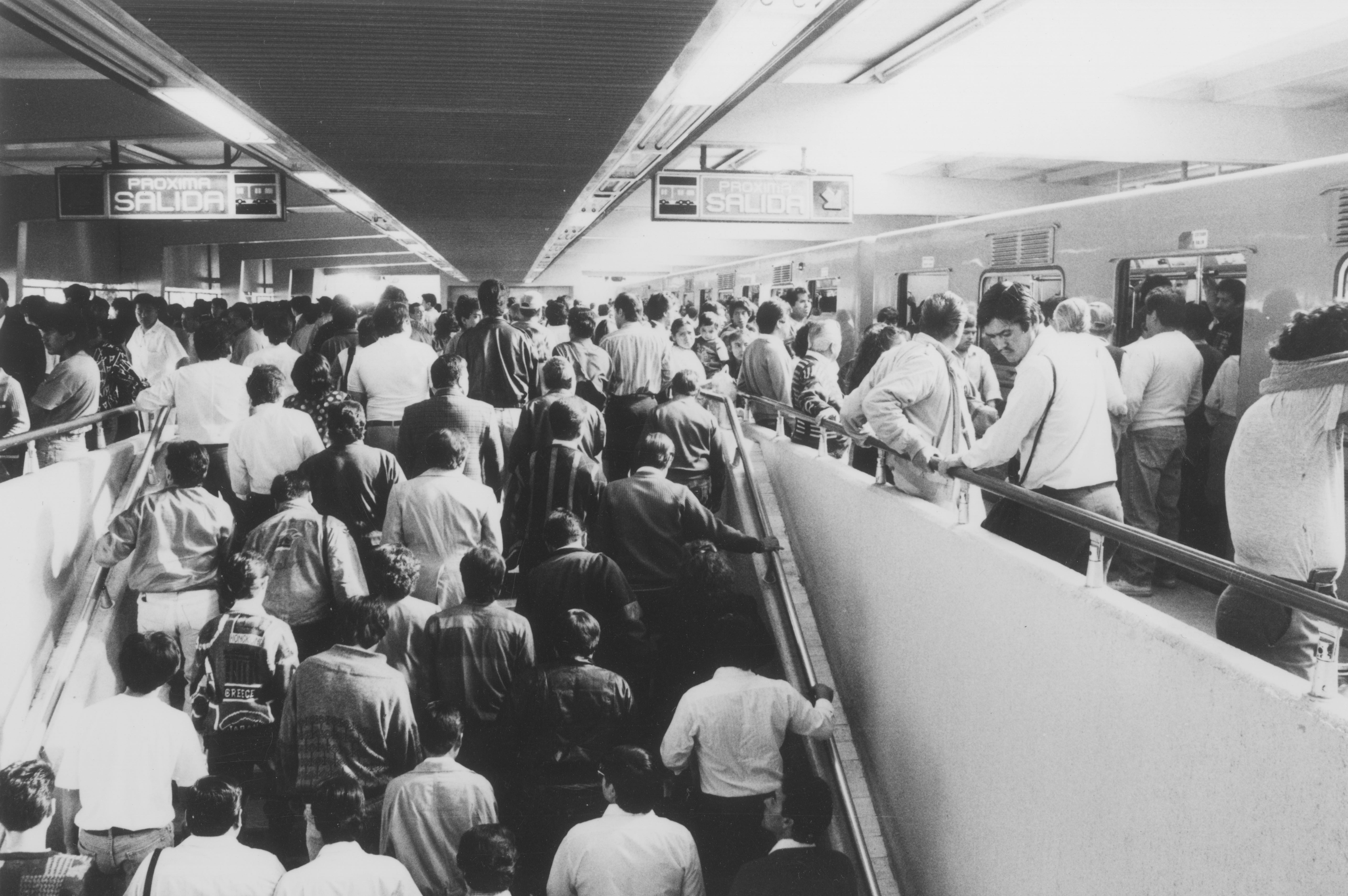
A crowded platform c. 1980s

Line 3 of the Mexico City Metro was built by Ingeniería de Sistemas de Transportes Metropolitano, Electrometro, and Cometro, the latter being a subsidiary of Empresas ICA. The section including Indios Verdes metro station formed part of a northward extension from La Raza, and opened on 1 December 1979, becoming the line's northern terminal station, with trains operations southward toward Hospital General station. The section between Indios Verdes and Deportivo 18 de Marzo station is 1,166 meters (3,825 ft) long.

Originally, Line 8, which runs from downtown Mexico City to Constitución de 1917 station in Iztapalapa, was planned to run from Pantitlán in eastern Mexico City to Indios Verdes. The project was canceled because of concerns over potential structural damage near the Zócalo, where the proposed line would have connected with Line 2 at Zócalo station. The project was subsequently redesigned to run between Indios Verdes and Constitución de 1917. However, construction has not progressed beyond Garibaldi / Lagunilla, which has served as the line's provisional northern terminal since 1994.

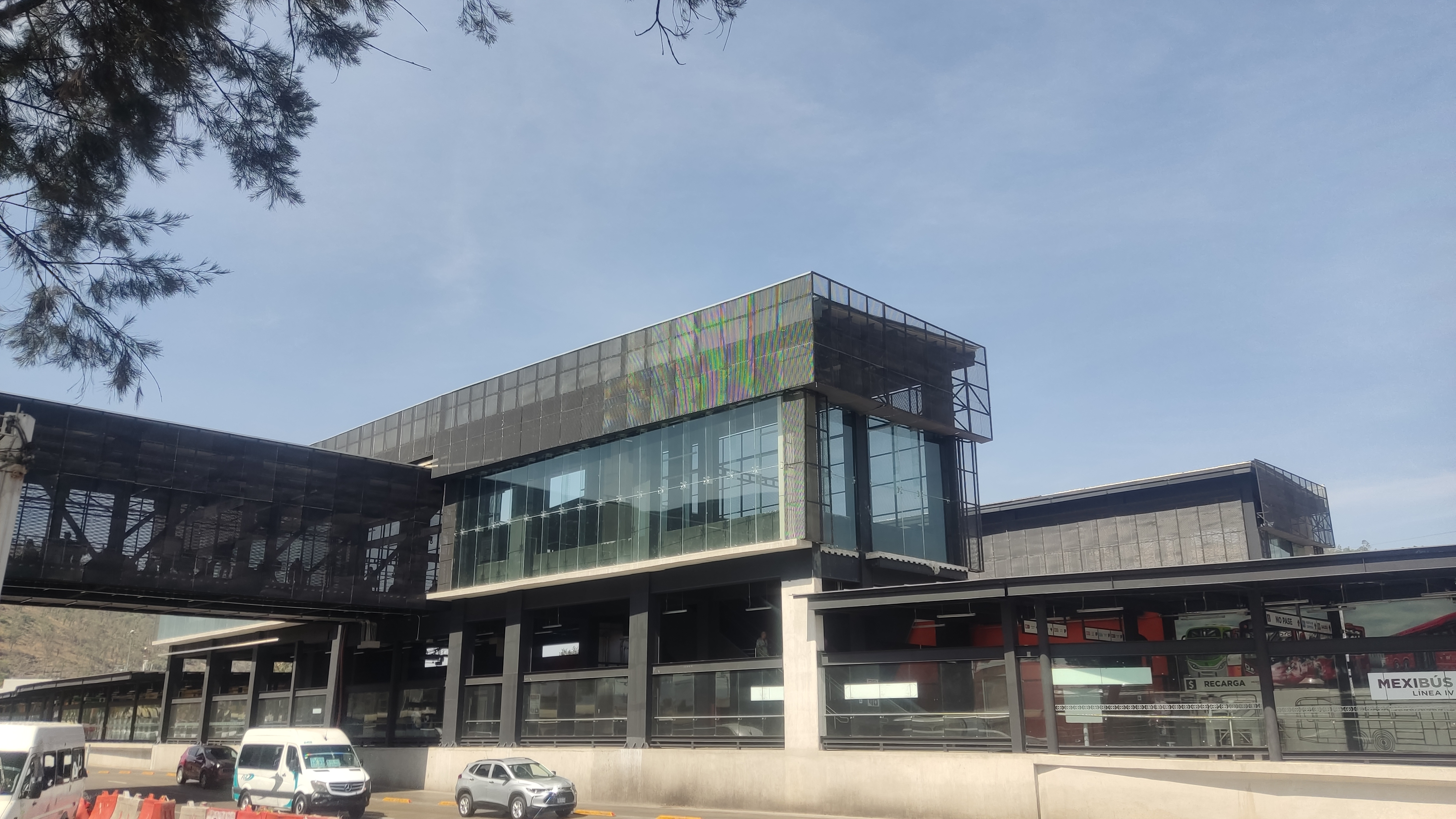
In the early 2020s, BRT stations were built next to the metro station; these are connected by bridges that lead to the various transportation services in the area.

Reorganization of the station's CETRAM began in 2020. The project included demolishing the Metrobús station serving Lines 1 and 3 and the temporary Mexibús station, and relocating both next to the Metro station building. It also aimed to reorganize the bus terminals and improve connections between the various modes of transportation through a series of pedestrian bridges linking the Metro with Cablebús, Metrobús Line 7, and Mexicable services. As of September 2024, the Metrobús, Mexibús, and Cablebús components of the project had been completed. As of September 2024, the Metrobús, Mexibús, and Cablebús projects have been completed.

=== Name and pictogram ===
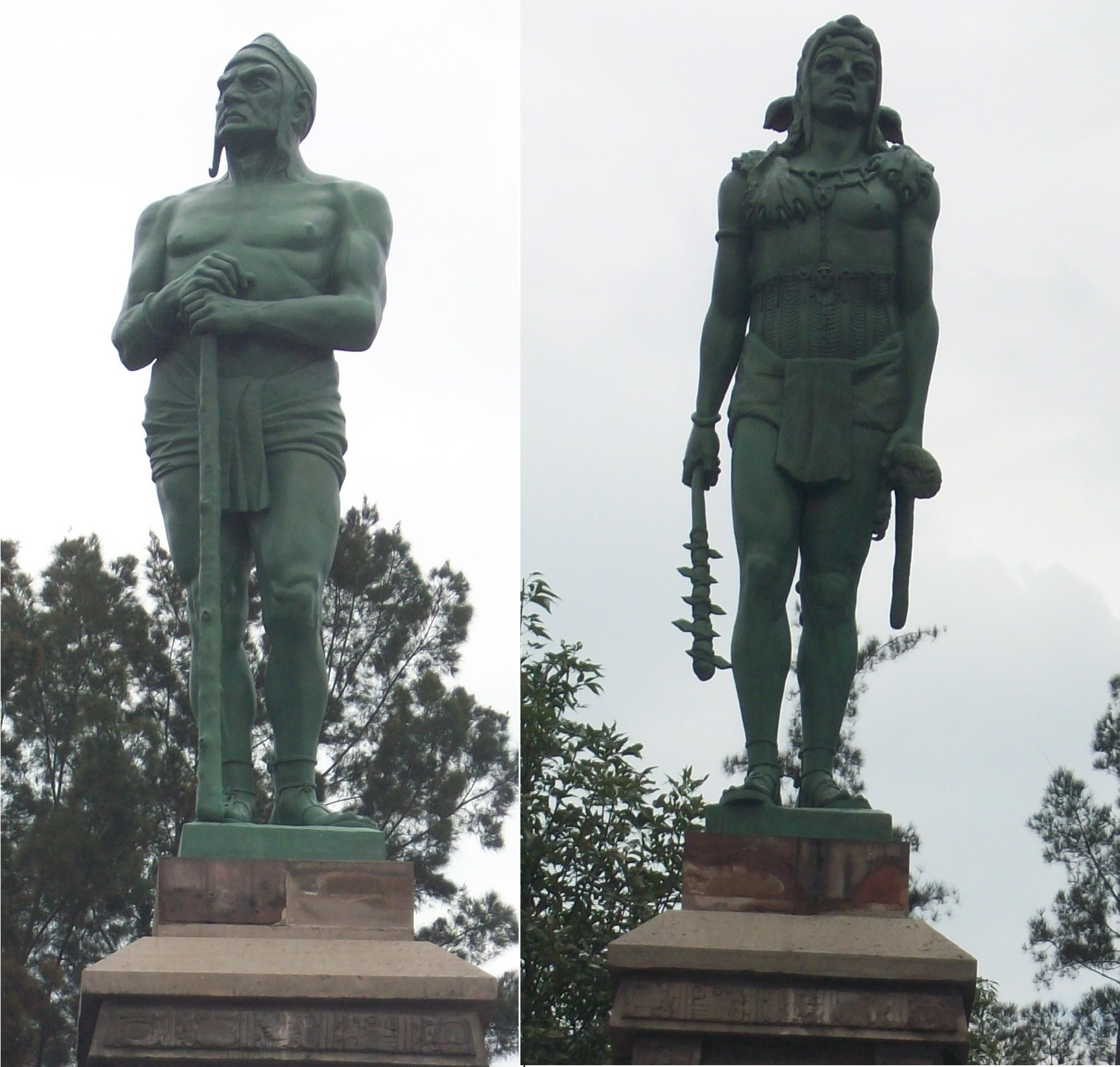
Statues of Ahuizotl (left) and Itzcoatl (right)

The station is named after the verdigris-covered statues of two Aztec rulers, the tlatoque Itzcoatl and Ahuitzotl, collectively known as the Monumento a los Indios Verdes (Green Indians Monument). The station's pictogram depicts silhouettes of the statues.

In April 2023, Adriana Espinosa de los Monteros, a representative for the National Regeneration Movement (MORENA) in the Congress of Mexico City, proposed renaming the station Estación Emperadores Mexicas (lit. transl. Aztec Emperors Station). She said the term Indian is derogatory and discriminatory, adding that the term "[is still used to hurt] the sensitivity of the recipient by considering [Indigenous peoples] inferior due to their poverty or Indigenous background". Espinosa argued that the change was necessary "to respect the spirit of the Political Constitution of Mexico City". The proposal applied only to the Metro station, with no clear indication of whether the change would also apply to the adjacent stations or the Monumento a los Indios Verdes.

Transportation operators in the area have pointed out that the change would be unnecessary and that it would not affect passengers or the way they refer to the station.

=== Incidents ===
At around 7:30 a.m. on 12 April 2013, an explosion was heard on the stairs leading to Platform I at CETRAM; no injuries or damage were reported. Authorities stated that, apparently, a man, with the help of an accomplice who was standing guard, left a box containing explosives, wires, pellets, a battery, and a clock on the stairs leading to Exit I.

On 10 February 2021, on a rainy afternoon, an approaching train caught fire on the platform, with no injuries were reported among the passengers. On 20 April 2021, the third railcar of a train derailed while the driver was performing a maneuver at the Ticomán marshalling yard. No injuries were reported, but the train had to be taken out of service. Similarly, on 30 March 2023 and 14 August 2026, trains experienced comparable incidents. On 23 July 2026, a fire was reported on the tracks near the station.

Indios Verdes is one of the metro stations that floods most frequently during heavy rain. According to Ángel Zúñiga, investigator of the UNAM Institute of Geography, the Indios Verdes area is affected by the geography of the Valley of Mexico, where water naturally flows from higher to lower elevations. In addition, the city's drainage system can become overwhelmed, a problem compounded by extensive concrete surfaces that prevent water from infiltrating the soil.

In November 2025, the CETRAM was reported to be poorly maintained. Damaged lamps left some walkways without adequate lighting, while other areas were covered in graffiti, littered with trash, and affected by the smell of urine. Elevators and escalators were out of service, and gates providing access to some bus routes were closed. As of July 2026, most of the elevators and escalators were still reported to be out of service; only those at the Mexicable and one at the Mexibús station were operational. An escalator had accumulated water. Street vendors used the spaces around the inoperative equipment to sell their products.

== Ridership ==
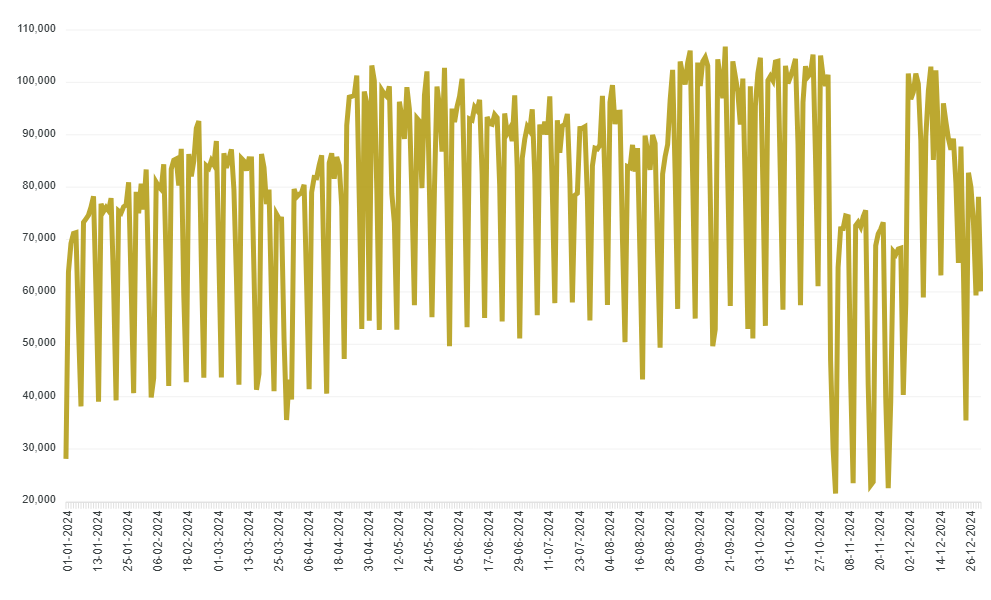
Daily ridership for Indios Verdes station in 2024

According to official data, before the impact of the COVID-19 pandemic, the station recorded between 107,300 and 117,300 average daily entries from 2016 to 2019. In 2025, it recorded 32,192,712 annual passenger entries, ranking third among the system's 195 stations.

Annual passenger ridership
Year	Ridership	Average daily	Rank	% change	Ref.
2025	32,192,712	88,199	3/195	+6.12%	
2024	29,859,194	81,582	3/195	−1.57%	
2023	30,335,090	83,109	2/195	−4.15%	
2022	31,649,534	86,711	1/195	+34.97%	
2021	23,449,776	64,245	2/195	−9.55%	
2020	25,925,584	70,834	2/195	−33.85%	
2019	39,192,273	107,376	3/195	−2.75%	
2018	40,302,169	110,416	2/195	+0.21%	
2017	40,218,841	110,188	2/195	−6.27%	
2016	42,908,356	117,235	1/195	−2.38%	

== Gallery ==
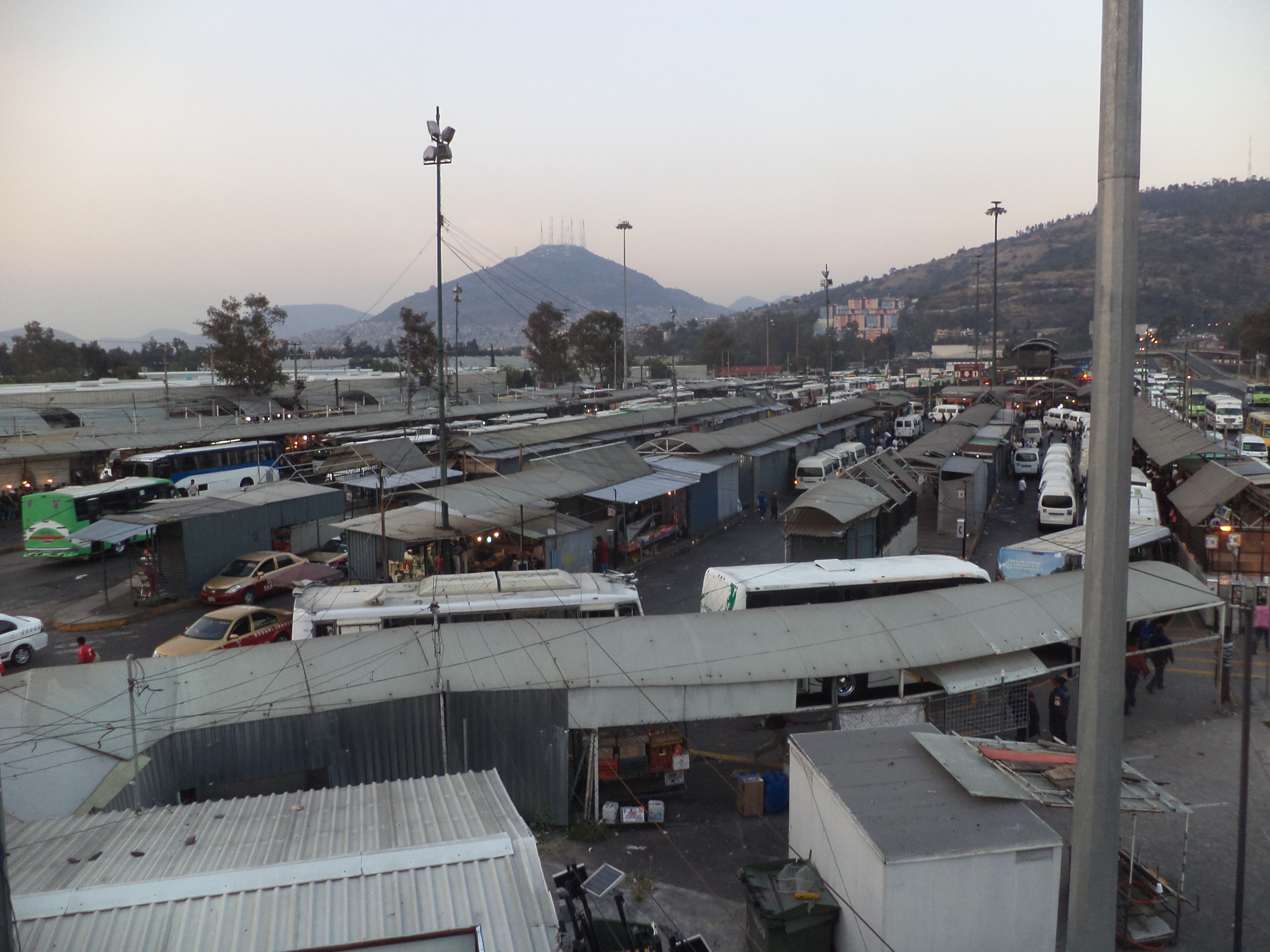
West view of the old CETRAM in 2015. In the background on the right, the former Metrobús station served Lines 1 and 3. The metro station is not visible but is located far to the right

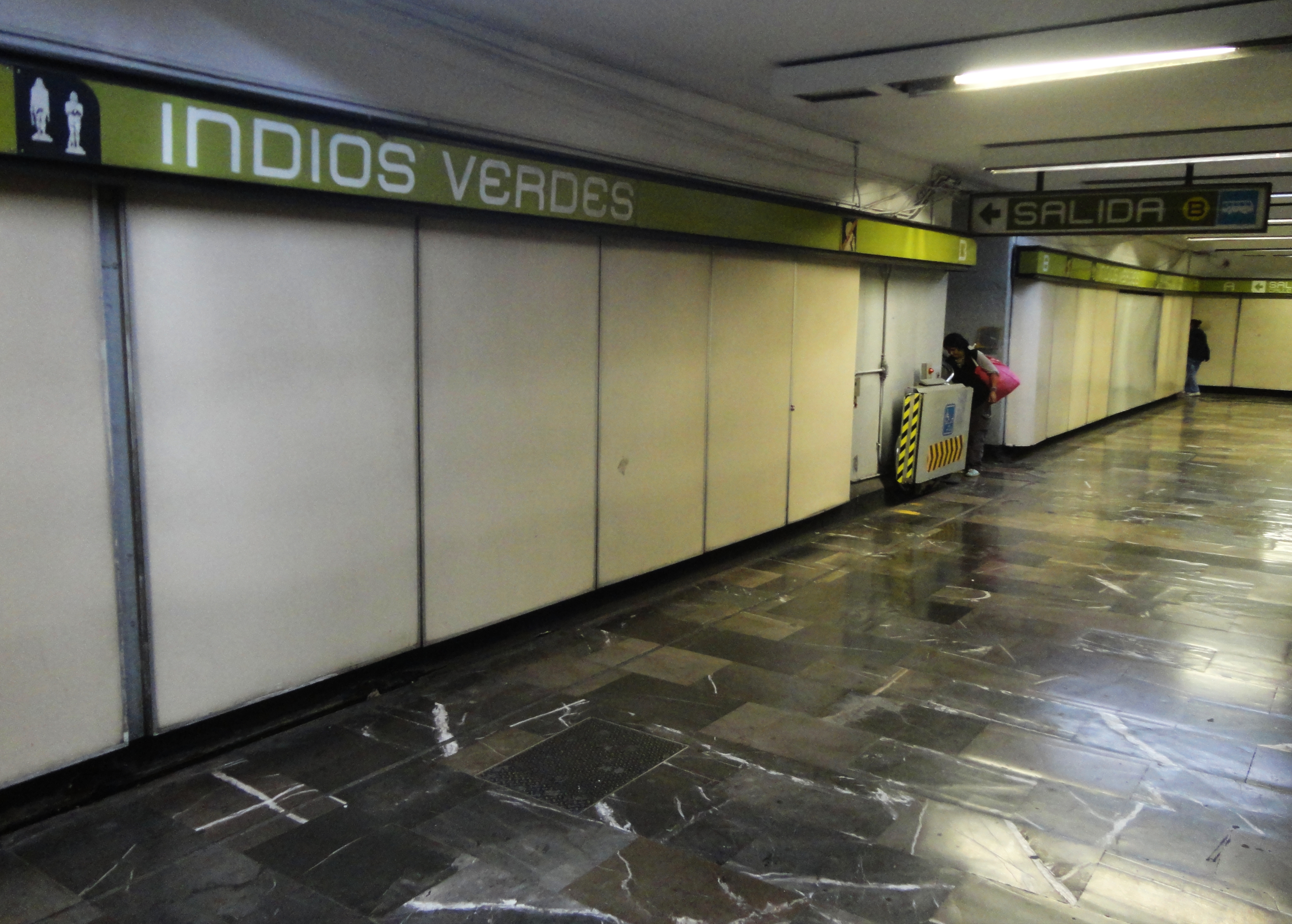
Exit to platforms A and B of the CETRAM, located east of the station.
