= Zócalo =

Plaza de la Constitución, Mexico City

- Plaza de la Constitución
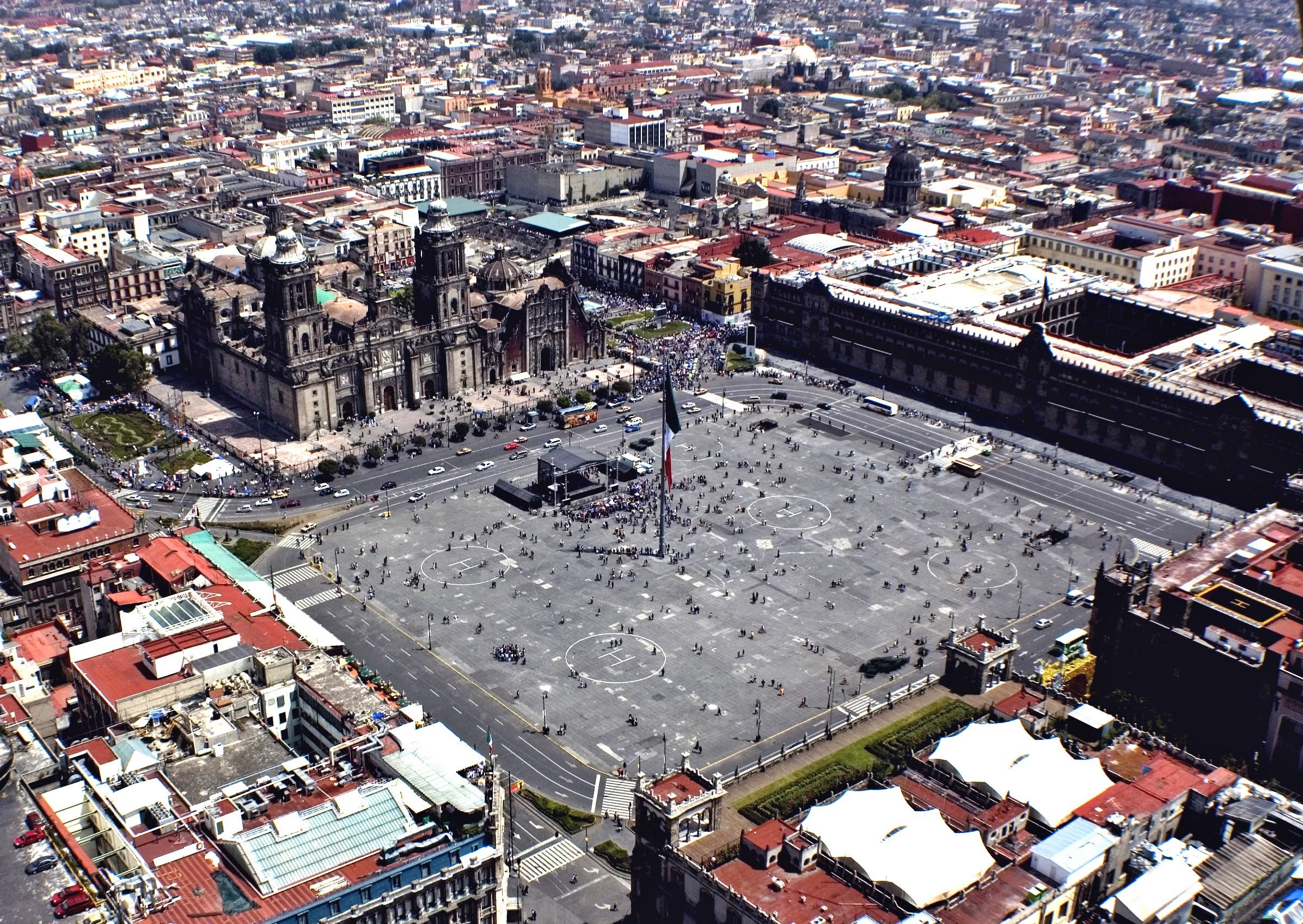
- Plaza de la Constitución
- Interactive map of Zócalo
- Location: Cuauhtémoc, Mexico City, Mexico
- Coordinates: 19°25′58″N 99°7′59″W
- Beginning date: 1521
- Completion date: 1523
- Opening date: 1524

Zócalo (Latin American Spanish pronunciation: [ˈsokalo]) is the common name of the main square in central Mexico City. Prior to the conquest by Spain, it was the main ceremonial center in the Aztec city of Tenochtitlan. The plaza used to be known simply as the Plaza Mayor ('Main Square') or Plaza de Armas ('Arms Square'), and today its formal name is Plaza de la Constitución ('Constitution Square').

This name does not come from any of the Mexican constitutions that have governed Mexico but from the Cádiz Constitution, which was signed in Spain in the year 1812. Even so, it is almost always called the Zócalo today. Plans were made to erect a column as a monument to independence, but only the base, or zócalo (meaning 'plinth'), was built. The plinth was buried long ago, but the name has lived on. Many other Mexican towns and cities, such as Oaxaca, Mérida, and Guadalajara, have adopted the word zócalo to refer to their main plazas, but not all.

It has been a gathering place for Mexicans since Aztec times, having been the site of Mexican ceremonies, the swearing-in of viceroys, royal proclamations, military parades, Independence ceremonies, and modern religious events such as the festivals of Holy Week and Corpus Christi. It has received foreign heads of state and is the main venue for both national celebrations and national protests. The Zócalo and surrounding blocks have played a central role in the city's planning and geography for almost 700 years. The site is just one block southwest of the Templo Mayor, which, according to Aztec legend and mythology, was considered the center of the universe.

== Description ==
The modern Zócalo in Mexico City is 57,600 m^{2} (240 m × 240 m). It is bordered by the Mexico City Metropolitan Cathedral to the north, the National Palace to the east, the Federal District buildings to the south and the Old Portal de Mercaderes to the west, the Nacional Monte de Piedad building at the northwest corner, with the Templo Mayor site to the northeast, just outside view. In the centre is a flagpole with an enormous Mexican flag ceremoniously raised and lowered each day and carried into the National Palace. There is an entrance to the Zócalo/Tenochtitlan metro station located at the northeast corner of the square, but no sign above ground indicates its presence.

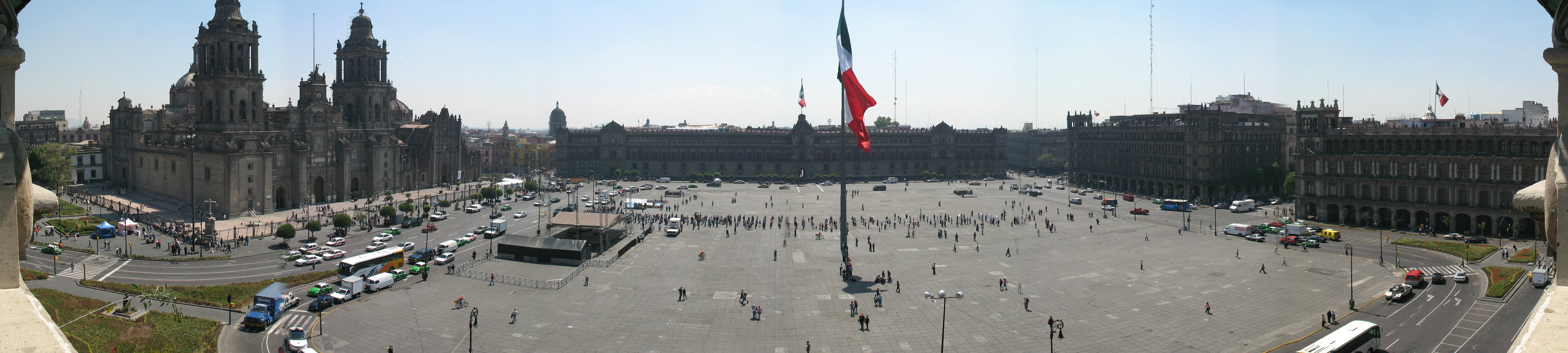
A panoramic view of the Zócalo (Plaza de la Constitución), Mexico City. Looking east from the rooftop restaurant on the Portal de Mercaderes to the Palacio Nacional

== History ==
=== Pre-conquest ===
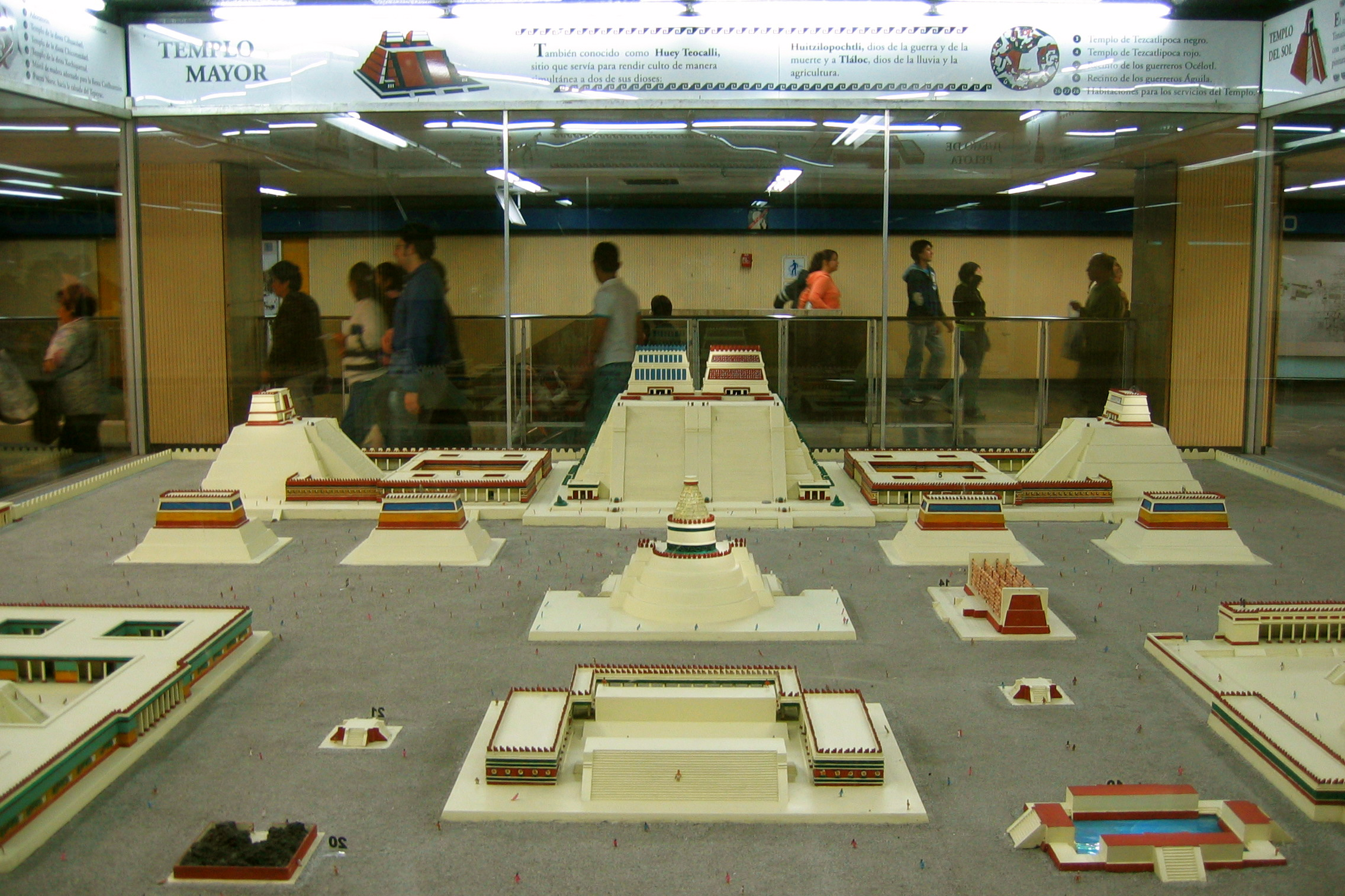
A model of Templo Mayor and Zócalo prior to the conquest. Mexico City Metro Zócalo/Tenochtitlan station

Prior to the conquest, the area that the Zócalo occupies was open space, in the center of the Aztec capital Tenochtitlan. It was bordered to the east by Moctezuma II's "New Houses" or Palace (which would become the National Palace) and to the west by the "Old Houses", the palace of Axayacatl (1469–1481) where the Emperor Ahuitzotl, Moctezuma's uncle and immediate predecessor also lived. A European-style plaza was not part of the conquered Aztec Tenochtitlan; the old city had a sacred precinct or teocalli which was the absolute center of the city (and the universe, according to Aztec belief), but it was located to the immediate north and northeast of the modern-day Zócalo.

The current Zócalo occupies a space south-southwest of the intersection of roads that oriented Tenochtitlan. The north–south road was called Tepeyac–Iztapalapa, for the locations north and south it led to. The Tlacopan road led west and stretched east a little before leading into the lake that surrounded the city at the time. These roads were the width of three jousting lances according to Hernán Cortés. This intersection divided the city into four neighborhoods. The sacred precinct, containing the Templo Mayor, was located to the northeast of this intersection and walled off from the open area for commoners. As to this area's relationship to the teocalli proper, some historians say that it was part of it, but others say no.

=== Viceroyalty of New Spain (1521–1821) ===
The modern plaza of Mexico City was placed by Alonso Garcia Bravo shortly after the invasion when he laid out what is now the historic center. After the destruction of Tenochtitlan, Cortés had the city redesigned for symbolic purposes. He kept the four major neighborhoods or capullis but he had a church, now the Cathedral of Mexico City, built at the place the four adjoined. He had the Temo become the cathedral. The southern half was called the Plaza Mayor (Main Square) and the northern one was called the Plaza Chica (Small Square). Fairly early in the colonial period, the Plaza Chica would be swallowed up by the growing city.

During early colonial times, the plaza was bordered to the north by the new church, and to the east by Cortés's new palace, built over and with the ruins of Moctezuma's palace. On the west side of the plaza, the Portales de Mercaderes (Merchants' Portals) were built, south of Cortés' other palace, the Palace of the Marquis of the Valley of Oaxaca. On the south side, was the Portal of the Flowers (Flores), named so after its owner, María Gutiérrez Flores de Caballerías. Next to this portal was the House of the Ayuntamiento, a government building for the city. Both of these were behind a small drainage canal that ran east–west.

Flooding was always an issue for the plaza and the city in general. The plaza was flooded in 1629 with water two meters deep, ruining many of the merchants located there and requiring many of the portals to be rebuilt. The drainage project to control flooding, known as the desagüe, drafted Indian men over nearly the whole colonial period, to work on this major infrastructure project. Controlling flooding meant health benefits for Mexico City residents by preventing human waste from polluting the city during floods and controlling mosquitoes, which spread disease. It also changed the ecological system that supported birds and fish populations and allowed for Indian cultivation of crops.

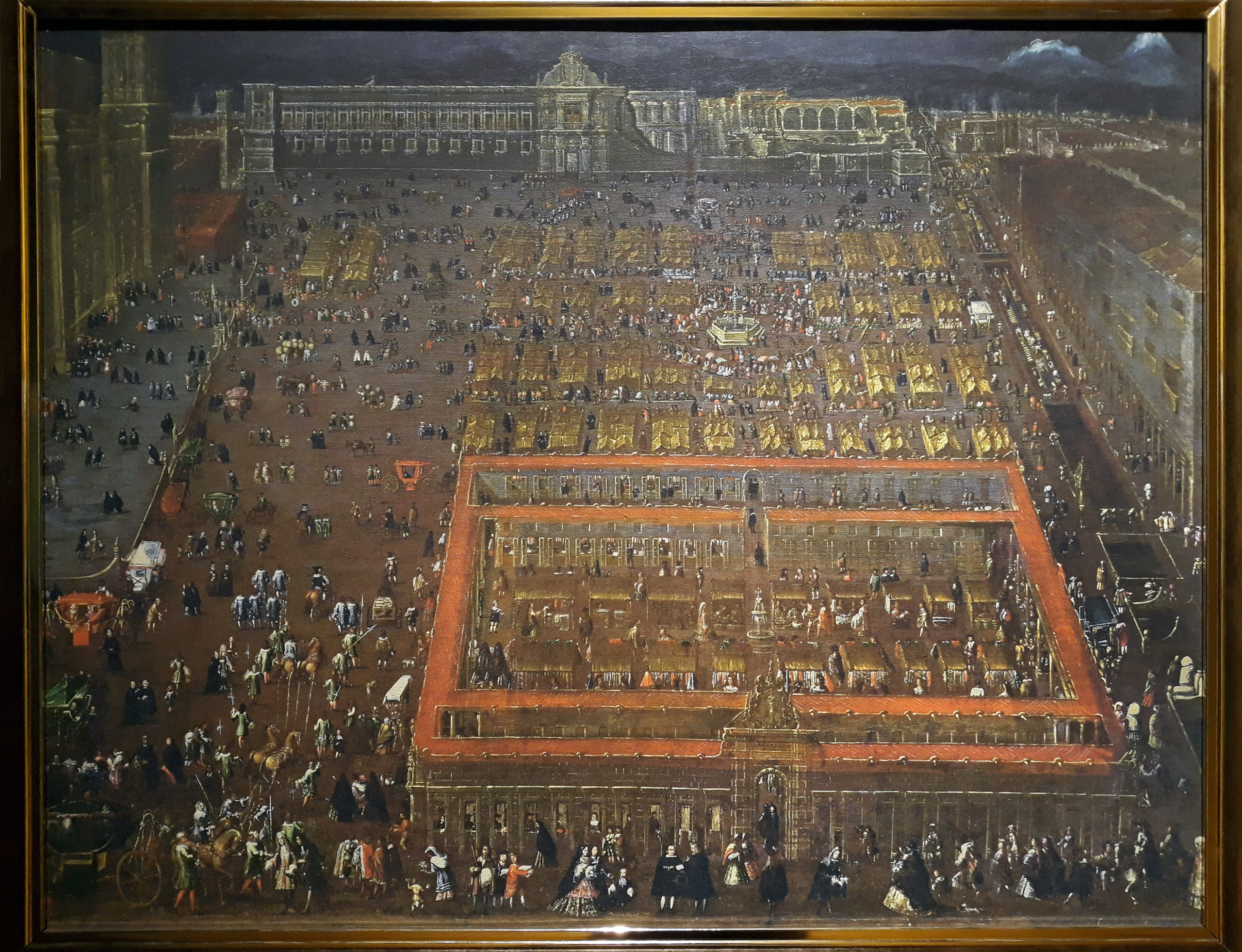
A view of the Plaza Mayor of Mexico city, ca. 1695, by Cristóbal de Villalpando. Painting currently located in Corsham Court, England

After the cathedral was constructed in the latter half of the 16th century, the look of the plaza changed. The old church faced east and not to the plaza itself. The new cathedral's three portals towered south over the plaza and giving the area a north–south orientation, which exists to this day.

Over much of the 17th century, the plaza became overrun with makeshift market stalls. After a mob burned the Viceregal Palace in 1692, depicted in the famous 1696 painting by Cristóbal de Villalpando, authorities attempted to completely clear the plaza to make way for more permanent market facilities, the Parián de Manila (or simply Parián or the Alcaicería), named after the silk trading district of Manila in Spanish Philippines.

The Parián was a set of shops in the southwest corner of the plaza used to store and sell luxury and exotic products brought by the Manila galleons from Asia, and later, luxury goods brought by galleons from Europe. This was opened in 1703 and earned a substantial income for the city council from shop rent, as well as turning the plaza into an "emporium of commerce" and the "center of Mexico's richest trade," as characterized by contemporary accounts. The Parián existed for around 140 years, before it was looted and destroyed during the Parián Riots of 1828.

This did not keep the rest of the plaza from becoming filled again with makeshift stalls such as the group known as "San José" located next to the Parián itself. This prompted historian Francisco Sedano to comment that it was ugly and unsightly. He claimed it was very difficult to walk around here at the time because of its uneven pavement, mud in the rainy season, aggressive street dogs, mounds of trash and human excrement tossed among corn husks and other discarded wrappings.

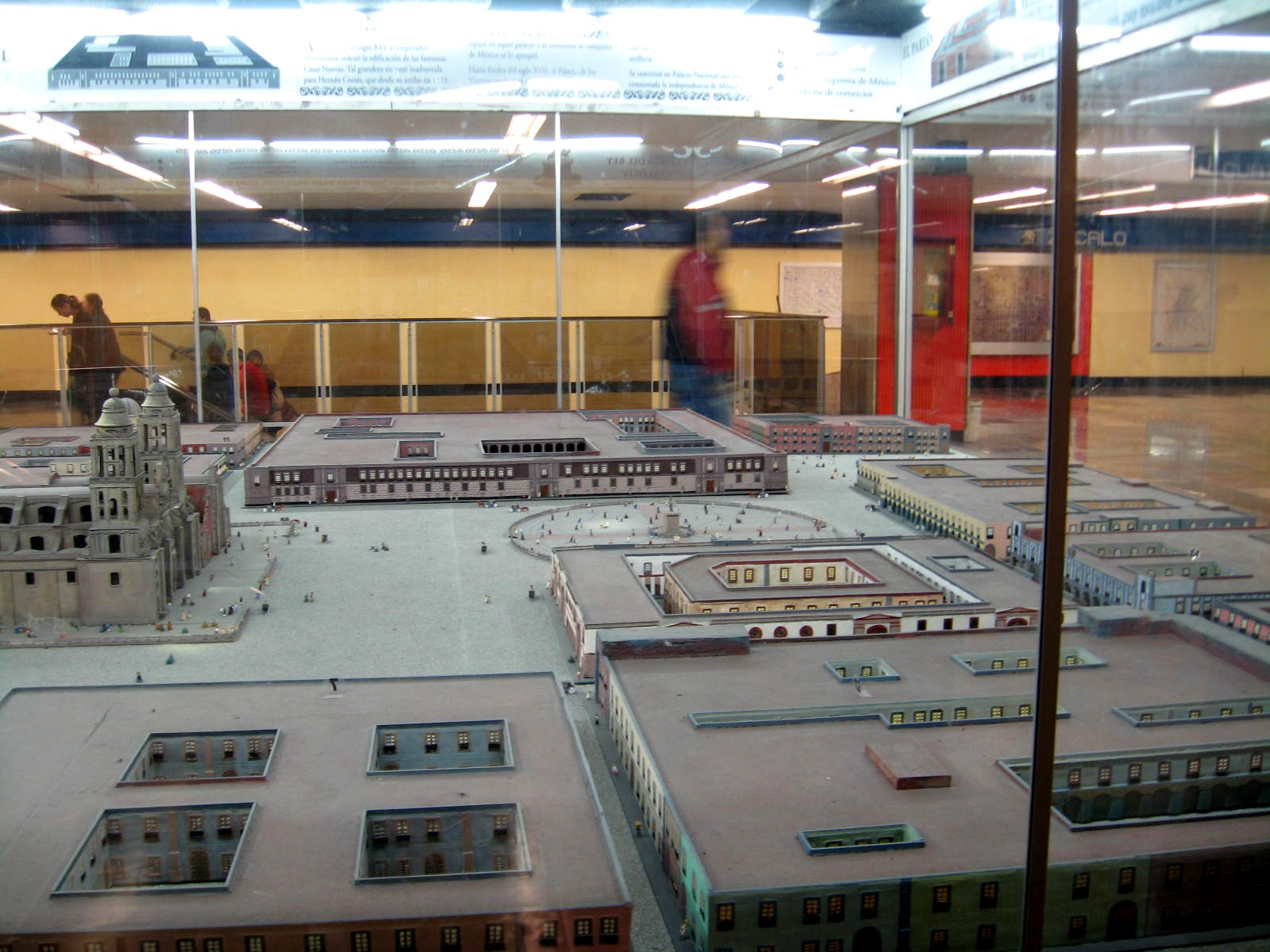
A model of Mexico City in early 19th century, with the Parián and statue of Charles IV in the Zócalo

Again the plaza was cleared (except the Parián) by proclamation of Charles IV of Spain in December 1789. Then-viceroy Juan Vicente Güemes Pacheco had the plaza repaved and the open gutters covered with stone blocks. He also had a fountain installed in each corner. During this work, the Aztec Calendar was unearthed, as well as a statue of the goddess Coatlicue. The Calendar was put on display on the west side of the cathedral, where it remained until about 1890 when it was moved to the old "Centro Museum". It now resides in the Museum of Anthropology. The statue eventually made its way to this museum, but not until it was practically buried in one of the back patios of the Royal and Pontifical University until after Independence. The former merchants of the plaza were moved primarily to a new building called the Mercado de Volador (Market of the Flyer), located southeast of the plaza where the Supreme Court building stands today.

The plaza was converted into a public space with 64 lamps. The cathedral was separated from the plaza by iron grating; 124 stone benches were installed and the plaza was marked off by low iron poles connected by iron chains. The main feature of the redesigned plaza was an equestrian statue of Charles IV by Manuel Tolsá. It was first placed in the southeastern corner of the plaza, first on a gilded wood base to inaugurate it in December 1803. When the monument was finished, the wooden base was replaced by an oval one of stone measuring 113 meters by 95.5 meters, with its own balustrade and corner fountains by José del Mazo.

This was the backdrop when Viceroy Don Félix María Calleja, other authorities, and assembled people all swore allegiance to the Constitution of Cádiz and fealty to the Spanish Crown on 22 May 1813 as the Mexican War of Independence raged. This event also resulted in the renaming the square as "Plaza of the Constitution." The last changes to the plaza before Independence in 1821 were done by Manuel Tolsá, who placed the Cross of Mañozca at the southeast corner and placing another, similar cross to the northwest. Both of these were set on stone Neoclassical pedestals.

=== Independence and the 1828 Parián Riot ===
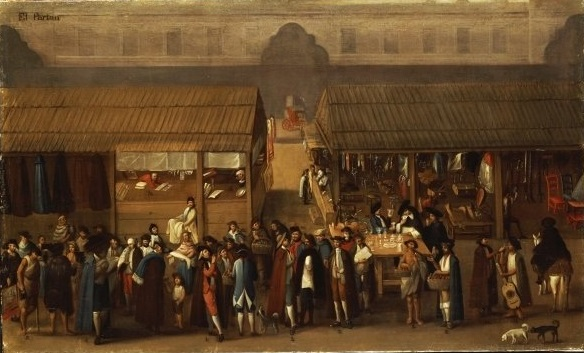
The Parián Market, completed in 1703

A symbolic move upon independence was the dismantling and removal of the equestrian monument to Charles IV from Plaza. The statue itself can still be seen in front of the National Art Museum, where its current—and much smaller—base states that it is preserved solely for its artistic value. The statue's former oval base was moved to what was then the university building and the balustrade was moved to the Alameda Central. This left the plaza bare except for the Parián.

On 4 and 5 December 1828, the Parián, the most active of Mexico City's markets, was looted and damaged by a popular uprising. Several merchants died and most were ruined. President Santa Anna finally had the Parián demolished in 1843. This left the plaza bare again, except for some ash trees and flower gardens that were planted and protected by stone borders. Santa Anna wanted to build a monument to Mexican Independence in the center of the plaza, but his project got only as far as the base (zócalo), which stayed there for decades and gave the plaza its current popular name. It stayed this way until 1866 when the Paseo del Zócalo (Path of the Zócalo) was created in response to the numbers of people who were using the plaza to take walks. A garden with footpaths was created; fountains were placed at each corner; 72 iron benches were installed and the area was lighted by hydrogen gas lamps. Santa Anna's base, however, was not removed.

=== Era of the Porfiriato ===
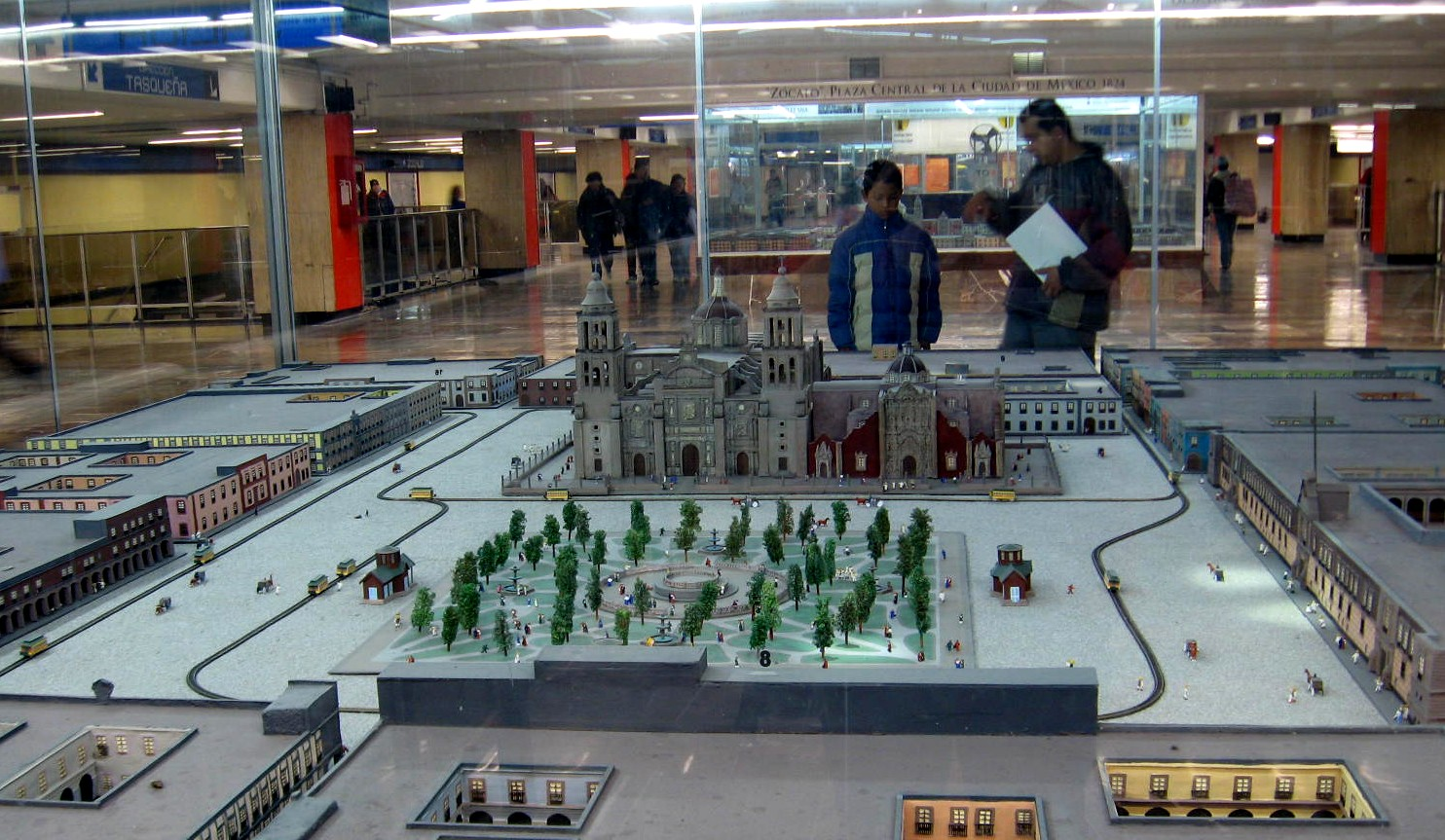
A model of the Zócalo circa 1910, with gardens and footpaths

In 1878, Antonio Escandon donated a kiosk to the city, which was set over and atop Santa Anna's base. It was lit by four large iron candelabras and designed to be similar to one in the Bois de Boulogne in Paris. Soon afterward, the company Ferrocarriles del Distrito Federal (Trains of the Federal District) converted part of the Zócalo into a streetcar station with ticket kiosk and stand. The streetcars and lighting were converted to electric power in 1894, and the Zócalo's paths were paved with asphalt in 1891.

From the latter half of the nineteenth century to the beginning of the twentieth, the Zócalo again filled with market stalls, including the Centro Mercantil which sold fabric, clothing, and Art Nouveau stonework. The other stalls concentrated on more mundane merchandise. This caused pedestrians to take their walks on Alameda Central or on San Francisco and Madero streets, to the west of the Zócalo.

=== 20th century ===
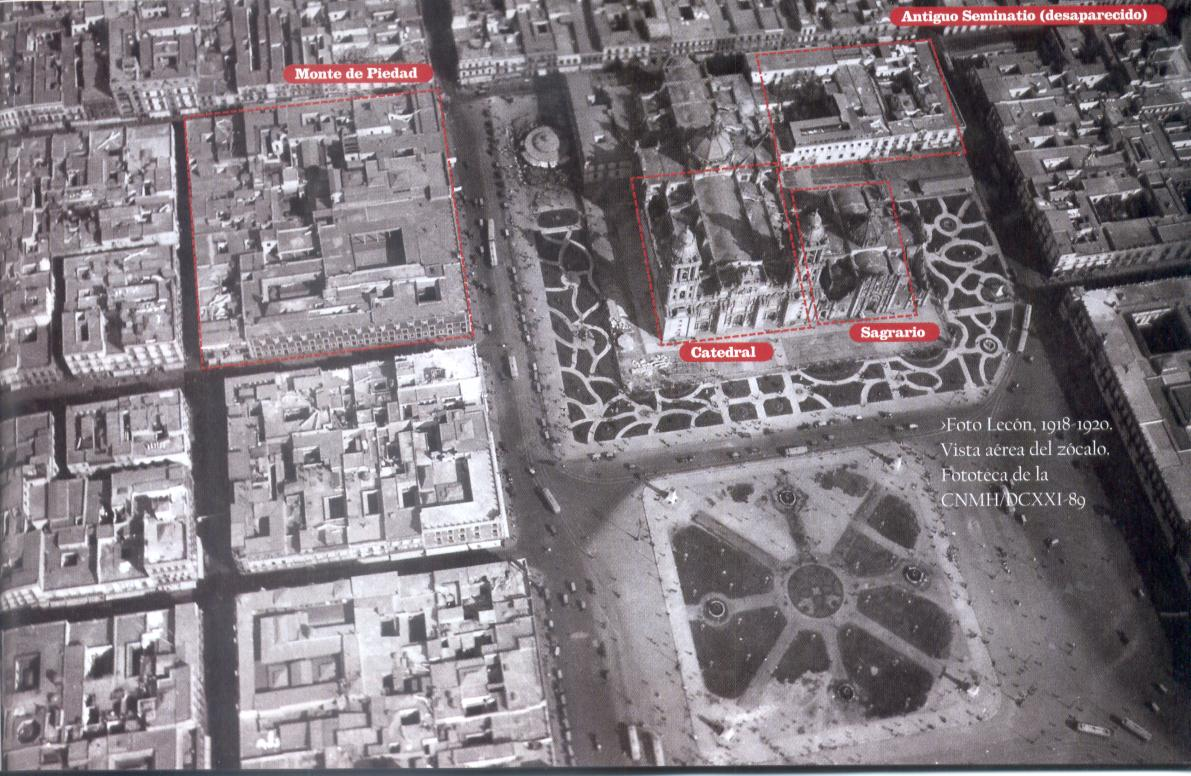
An aerial view of the Zócalo, taken between 1918 and 1920

During the Decena Trágica (the ten days from 9 to 19 February 1913), the National Palace was bombarded from the nearby military fort, incidentally damaging the Zócalo. In 1914, the ash trees planted in the previous century (which meanwhile had grown considerably) were taken out; new footpaths, grassy areas, and garden space were created; and palm trees were planted in each corner of the plaza.

The Zócalo was a meeting place for protests for 1 May. In 1968, students protested against the authoritarian measures taken by then-president Gustavo Díaz Ordaz. It was also the starting point of the marathon run in the 1968 Summer Olympics. The plaza deteriorated until, by the 1970s, all that was left were light poles and a large flagpole in the center. Then the ground was leveled again, the train tracks taken out, and the whole plaza cemented over. Automobile parking was prohibited and the plaza's shape was squared to 200 meters on each side. Later in the 1970s, the Zócalo was repaved with pink cobblestones; small trees protected by metal grates were planted; and small areas of grass were seeded around the flagpole.

As the end of the twentieth century neared, the Zócalo, along with most of the city center (called the Colonia Centro) was in massive disrepair. This caused The Economist magazine to remark that the Zócalo and the area surrounding it "... should be one of the most compelling architectural destinations in the Americas. Instead, much of it is a slum of gutted buildings, dark and dirty streets blocked by milling vendors, and garbage-strewn vacant lots."

In the late 1990s, Cuauhtémoc Cárdenas, then mayor of Mexico City, and Dr. Rene Coulomb, general director of the Historic Center Trust, launched a $300,000,000 renovation of the Zócalo and the surrounding city center, with the aim of attracting businesses and residents back to the area. There were plans to remove the iron grating separating the cathedral from the Zócalo, but there was so much public opposition to the idea that it was eventually scrapped.

=== 21st century ===
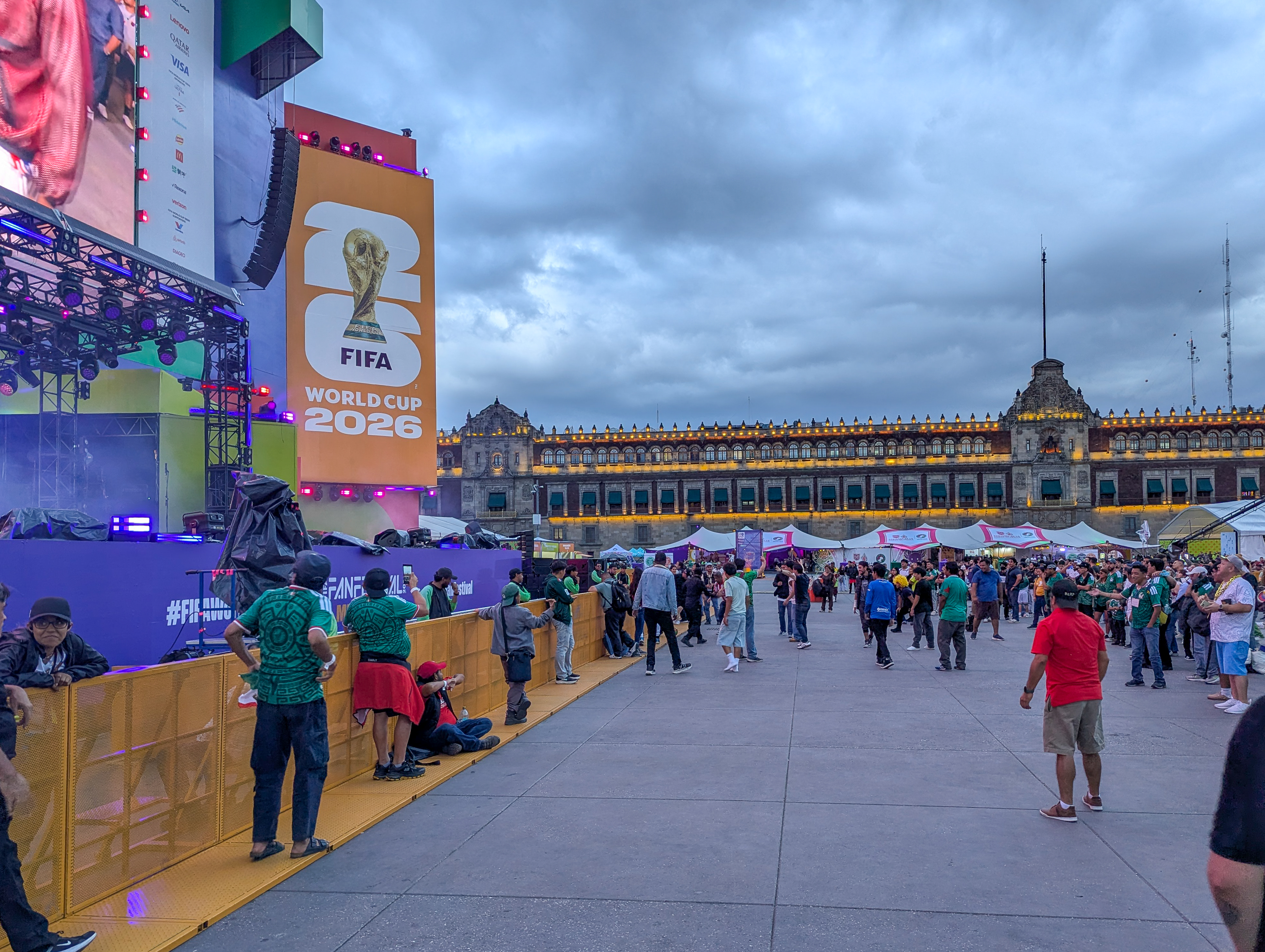
Zócalo hosting a FIFA Fan Festival during the 2026 FIFA World Cup.

In 2009, former mayor Marcelo Ebrard launched a campaign to perform maintenance works in the Historic Center (which, because of Congressional reduction of the annual budget of the local government, was largely supported with the money collected in the streets for that purpose by government officials). The campaign had satisfactory results. In 2010, a replica of the Angel de la Independencia was brought to Zócalo as a way of spreading out the protesters from the original Angel site. This is because the original site of the Angel is located in a financial area, with a high traffic flow, making policing more difficult than the Zócalo.

The Day of the Dead celebrations at the Zócalo have been a common event, and a formal parade has been held at the square since 2016 after the James Bond film Spectre featured a parade there.

== As a political hub ==
The Zócalo is the center of government of both the nation and of the capital, where the powers-that-be are. This makes it a popular place for protests, and it is often dotted with protesters in makeshift camps and banners. As the plaza can hold more than 100,000 people, it is also the scene of major political rallies. Thousands rallied here in protest when Cuauhtémoc Cárdenas lost against Carlos Salinas in a presidential election widely believed to have been rigged in 1988.

In 2001, followers of Zapatista leader Subcomandante Marcos, mostly poor Chiapan indigenous people, marched into the Zócalo to support a bill that would give them greater political autonomy. Following Cárdenas' lead, Andrés Manuel López Obrador staged major protests here after the 2006 Mexican presidential elections as well as a rally with thousands of participants against President Calderón's initiative to allow private and foreign investment in Mexico's state-owned energy company, PEMEX. On 30 August 2008, a peaceful protest against crime and violence filled the Zócalo to capacity.

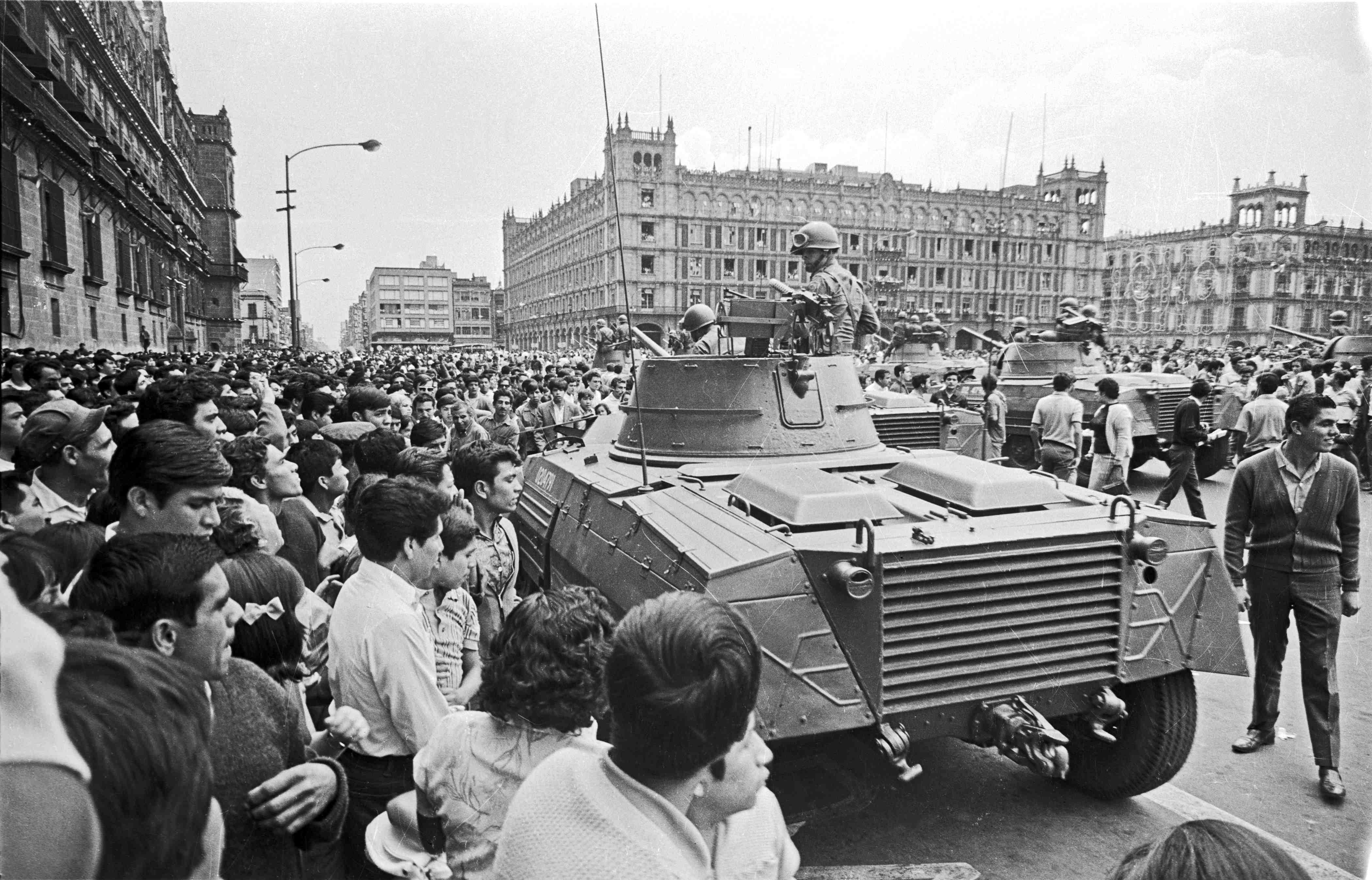
Protesters and Mexican army during 1968 protests

The plaza is home to regularly occurring political events. Just before 11 pm on each 15 September, the president of Mexico comes out onto the central balcony of the National Palace to perform the Grito de Dolores to the crowd gathered in the plaza. Even this is sometimes subject to the political winds of the country. For the 2006 Grito, the crowd in the Zócalo was addressed not by then-President Vicente Fox, who had gone to Dolores Hidalgo, Guanajuato to deliver the Grito, but by Alejandro Encinas, then-mayor of Mexico City. This was done to avoid mass protests in the Zócalo following the disputed presidential election between Felipe Calderón and López Obrador.

Under the unpopular rule of Enrique Peña Nieto, the ceremony has been subjected to widespread criticism —mostly from left-leaning sources— for the government's notorious use of acarreados (people who are literally carried into the square by bus and paid for with food or other minor goods) in order to boost attendance numbers and simulate popular enthusiasm.

An alternative expression of Mexican pride is the celebration of the spring equinox on the Zócalo. This is done by groups looking to reassert the superiority of indigenous ethnic bloodlines (La Raza) and pre-Hispanic culture. They choose to do the ceremony here not only because it is close to where such rites used to be performed before the Spaniards came, but also because they are right next to the symbols of "Spanish" ecclesiastical and secular power (the cathedral and National Palace, respectively), which they oppose.

The Zócalo area has been, since 2014, where large rallies have been held in the aftermath of the 2014 Iguala mass kidnapping, an event that has become symbolic for the climate of widespread criminality, impunity and governmental corruption that many feel the country faces.

== As an artistic venue ==
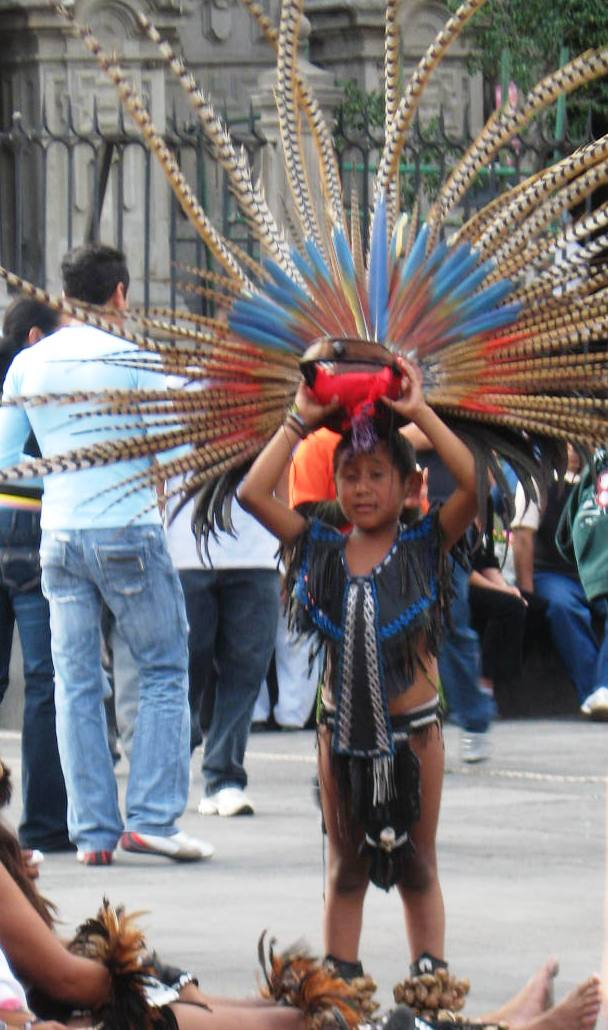
A kid wearing the typical clothing to perform an Aztec Dance in the Zócalo

Since 1982, due to efforts to revitalize the city center, the Zócalo has become the scene of a number of artistic and cultural events. There are daily impromptu shows of Aztec dancers dancing to drums, wearing feathered headdresses and anklets made of concha shells. On a grander scale, some examples of events held here recently are Spencer Tunick's photo shoot where nearly 18,000 Mexicans bared all for the artist, surpassing the record set earlier in Barcelona and artist Gregory Colbert's Ashes and Snow Nomadic Museum. One curious event was the building of a temporary ice-skating rink of about 3,200 m^{2} in the middle of the Zócalo, for use by the city's residents for free in the winter of 2007. Since then, the rink has been repeatedly built up for several winter seasons.

The Festival de México is an annual event with programs dedicated to art (popular and fine) and academia held in the Zócalo and some other venues in the historic center. In 2008, the 24th Festival had 254 performances and shows from over 20 countries in 65 plazas and other locations near the plaza.

The Zócalo is often the site of major parades in the city, including the Alebrije Parade and Day of the Dead Parade.

Concerts by popular singers and groups have also been held here. Café Tacuba drew almost 100,000 people to the plaza in 2005 and Colombian superstar Shakira drew a crowd of about 210,000 according to Mexico's Civil Protection. In August 2008, a skateboarding/BMX event drew 50,000 young people on a Sunday afternoon. Paul McCartney drew an attendance of 250,000 people for a free concert played on the plaza on 10 May 2012 as a part of his On the Run Tour.

Justin Bieber also offered a free show on 11 July 2012, where he performed in front of 210,000 people as part of the tour for his 2012 album Believe. On 1 October 2016, Roger Waters performed in the square before 170,000 people, once again for free and with a strong political message against Donald Trump and Enrique Peña Nieto included in sections of the show, which consisted of outtakes from his Pink Floyd years.

Shakira performed a free concert attended by more than 400,000 people on 1 March 2026, which set the record for the largest audience ever at this square.

On 15 March 2026, the square hosted the world's largest football class, which was attended by 9,500 people.

The square hosted a FIFA Fan Festival for the 2026 FIFA World Cup.

== In popular culture ==
The sci-fi series Babylon 5 uses the name "Zocalo" as the station's main gathering place.

Dutch trance music producer Armin Van Buuren has a song called "Zocalo" on his 2005 album Shivers, which, Josh Gabriel, of Gabriel & Dresden, recounts is named after Zocalo Coffeehouse in San Leandro, California, which Armin visited while recording the song, and which is itself named after the Zócalo in Mexico City.

The pre-title sequence of the 2015 James Bond film Spectre takes place largely above the Zócalo, as Bond takes command of a SPECTRE getaway helicopter. The scene is set against a Day of the Dead parade, which actually had never been held at the square before. After the film's release, the city officials decided to hold a Day of the Dead parade starting at the Angel of Independence and finishing at the Zócalo on 29 October 2016, using props and wardrobe from the film. The parade has been held every year since.

The release of the acoustic version of the Twenty One Pilots song "Chlorine" contains the coordinates to this location.

The Zócalo appears as a unique quarter for the Mexican civilization in 2025's Civilization VII.

== See also ==
- Statues of Pegasus, Mexico City, formerly installed in the plaza
- Zócalo (Puebla)
