= Zócalo/Tenochtitlan metro station =

Mexico City Metro station

Zócalo/Tenochtitlan
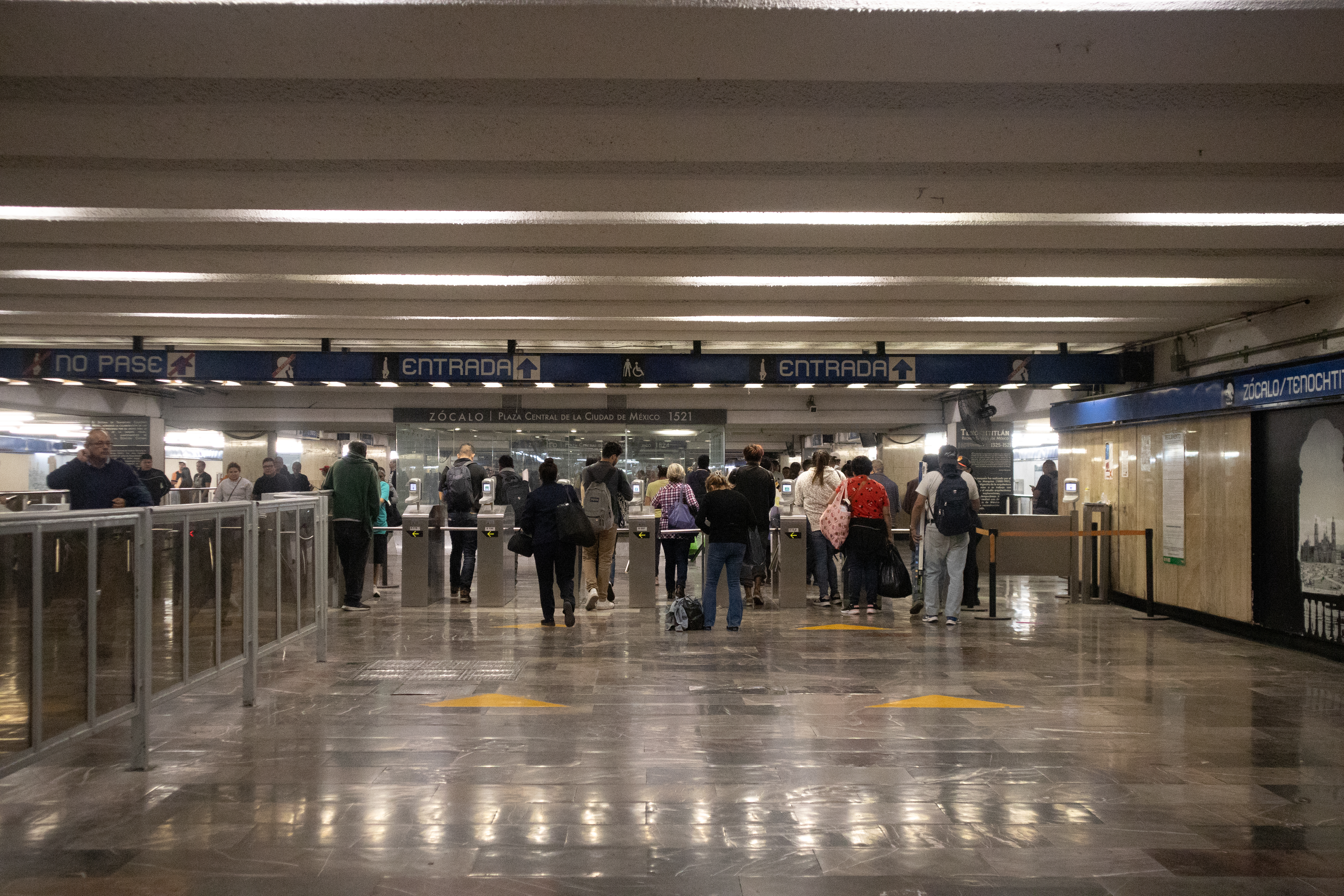
- One of the lobbies in 2025

General information
- Location: Plaza de la Constitución; Cuauhtémoc, Mexico City; Mexico
- Coordinates: 19°26′00″N 99°07′58″W
- System: Mexico City Metro
- Owner: Government of Mexico City
- Operator: Sistema de Transporte Colectivo (STC)
- Platforms: 2 side platforms
- Tracks: 2
- Connections: Zócalo–Pino Suárez passageway; Ecobici; Various local service routes

Construction
- Structure type: Underground
- Accessible: Partial

Other information
- Status: In service (Note: Due to its location, the station is frequently closed during events in the area.)

History
- Opened: 14 September 1970; 56 years ago
- Former names: Zócalo (1970–2021)

Passengers
- 2025: 13,363,036 (Note: The system's website counts only passenger entries into stations and does not include passengers passing through, transferring between lines, or exiting the station. The data here is limited to the most recent ten years to avoid excessive listings; earlier figures can be found in this page's history or on the Mexico City Metro website. To calculate the average daily ridership, the annual total is divided by 365 days (366 in leap years), with decimals omitted from the result. Each station per line is ranked individually, as the system counts transfer stations separately. The percentage change is calculated automatically using the data from the current year and the previous year.) ▼4.88%
- Rank: 14/195

Services
Preceding station	Mexico City Metro	Following station
Allende toward Cuatro Caminos	Line 2	Pino Suárez toward Tasqueña
Route map
Location
- Location within Mexico City
- Area map and exits

Zócalo/Tenochtitlan metro station (Note: Estación del Metro Zócalo/Tenochtitlan. Mexican Spanish pronunciation: [ˈsokalo tenotʃˈtitlan]. "Zócalo" means "Main square" in Mexican Spanish; for the etymology of "Tenochtitlan", a Nahuatl word, refer to Tenochtitlan § Etymology.) is a station on the Mexico City Metro in the historic center of the city, in the Cuauhtémoc borough. It is an underground station with two side platforms, serving Line 2 (Blue Line) between Allende and Pino Suárez stations.

Zócalo/Tenochtitlan metro station is located in the heart of downtown Mexico City, near the National Palace, the Metropolitan Cathedral, and the archaeological remains of Tenochtitlan's main temple, the Templo Mayor, among other landmarks. The station's pictogram features the coat of arms of Mexico and its name derives from the Plaza de la Constitución, commonly known as Zócalo, which is Mexico City's main square situated above the station.

The station opened on 14 September 1970 as Zócalo, providing westbound service toward Tacuba and eastbound service toward Tasqueña. It was renamed in August 2021 to commemorate the 500th anniversary of the fall of Tenochtitlan. The facilities offer partial accessibility to people with disabilities including an elevator.

Inside the station are an Internet café, an information desk, a cultural display, a mural titled Cenefas conmemorativas del Bicentenario by Juan Carlos Garcés Botello and Jesús Cristóbal Flores Carmona, and a passageway connecting to Pino Suárez station, which has a free mini-cinema and several bookstores. In 2025, the station had an average daily ridership of 36,611 passenger entries, ranking it the 14th busiest station in the network. Due to its location, the station may be closed depending on events in the area.

== Location and layout ==
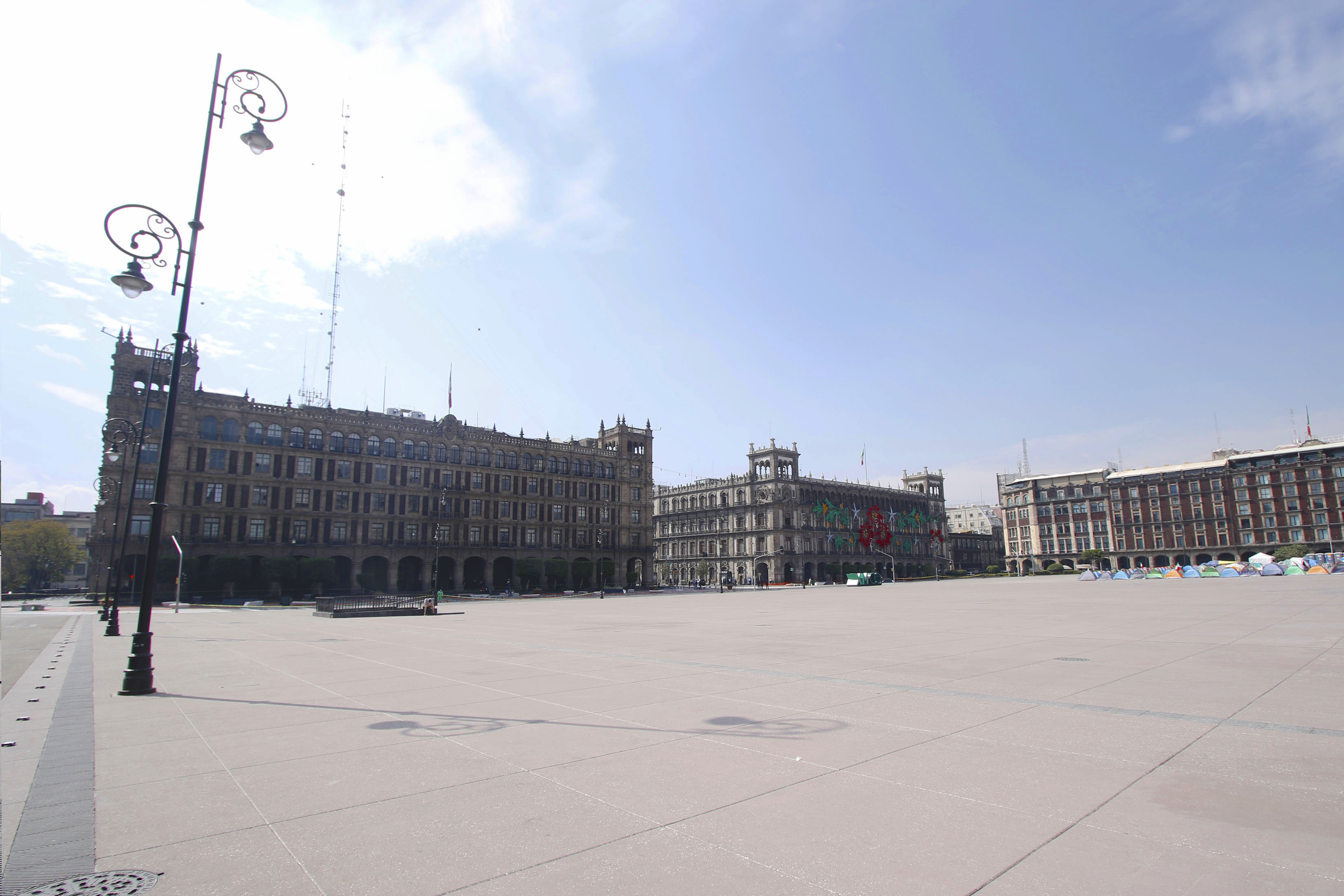
The east entrance is located across from the corner of the National Palace (not pictured) and the Mexico City Government Building (left).

Zócalo/Tenochtitlan is an underground metro station on Line 2 in the colonia (neighborhood) of Centro, also known as the historic center of Mexico City. It is located in the Cuauhtémoc borough and serves several notable landmarks, including Plaza de la Constitución (which is locally known as "Zócalo"), the National Palace, the Metropolitan Cathedral, and the archaeological remains of Tenochtitlan's main temple, the Templo Mayor.

The station has six exits. The first is located to the east, next to the National Palace, while the second is on the opposite side, serving the Zócalo. The third and fourth exits are on Avenida Pino Suárez, on the south side of the square: one on Calle Corregidora (near the Supreme Court of Justice of the Nation building) to the southeast, and the other near the corner of Calle Venustiano Carranza. The remaining two exits serve the northern part of the square, with one next to the Metropolitan Cathedral and the other near the National Palace, close to the corner of Calle Moneda.

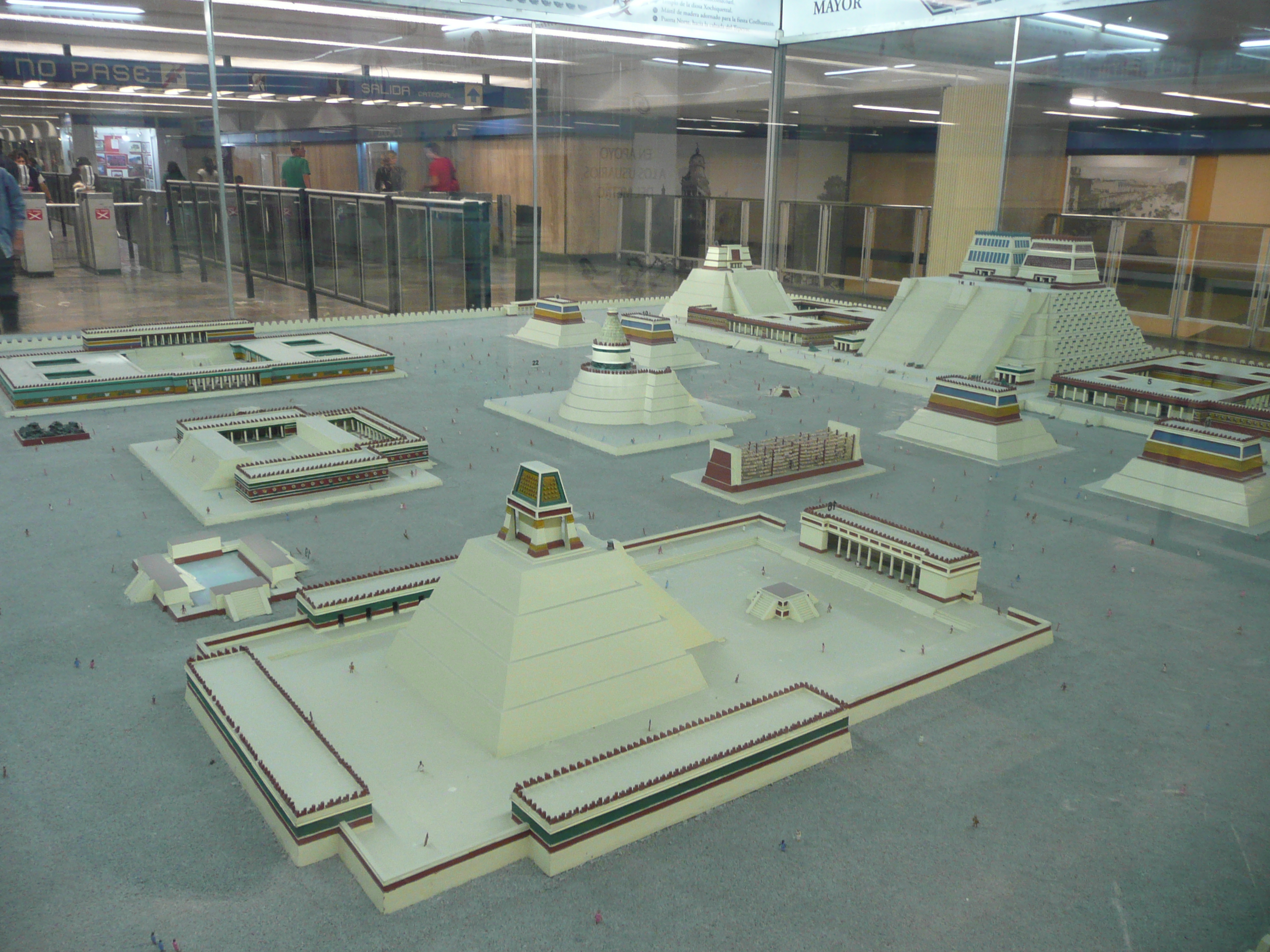
Scale model of Tenochtitlan in 1521 inside the station

The facilities are partially accessible to people with disabilities, including an elevator. Within the system, the station lies between Allende and Pino Suárez metro stations. The Ecobici bicycle-sharing system serves the area.

=== Landmarks ===
Inside the station are an information desk and multiple murals titled Cenefas conmemorativas del Bicentenario, painted by Juan Carlos Garcés Botello and Jesús Cristóbal Flores Carmona for the commemoration of the outbreak of the Mexican War of Independence and the Mexican Revolution. The station also features a cultural display managed by the National Institute of Anthropology and History, which illustrates the history of the Zócalo through a scale model.

The station has a corridor connecting it to Pino Suárez station via an underground passageway on the south side, known as Pasaje Zócalo–Pino Suárez. Opened in 1997, it includes 42 bookstores, a free library, and a mini-cinema. Originally, it was intended to serve as a connection to a proposed station named Salvador, but the plan was canceled due to the proximity of existing stations.

== History and construction ==
Line 2 of the Mexico City Metro was built by Ingeniería de Sistemas de Transportes Metropolitano, Electrometro and Cometro, the latter being a subsidiary of Empresas ICA. Its first section, which includes Zócalo station, was inaugurated on 14 September 1970, running from Tasqueña to Tacuba. The tunnel between Zócalo and Allende is 602 meters (1,975 ft) long, while the section between Zócalo and Pino Suárez measures 745 meters (2,444 ft).

In 1983, plans were made for the Zócalo station to serve as an interchange between Line 2 with the proposed Line 8, which was intended to run from Indios Verdes to Pantitlán station. However, the project was canceled due to inadequate planning and concerns about potential damage to historic buildings. The line was subsequently rerouted to operate from Garibaldi to Constitución de 1917 stations, following a route beneath Avenida Eje Central.

Since 2009, the station has offered a free Internet café, the first of its kind in the metro system. In December 2019, the turnstiles on the southern side were replaced with motion-sensor speed gates to prevent fare evasion.

=== Name and pictogram ===
The pictogram depicts the coat of arms of Mexico, showing an eagle perched on a prickly pear cactus devouring a snake. The station is named after the Zócalo, Mexico City's main square.

The term zócalo originally referred to an architectural base or plinth. During the era of Antonio López de Santa Anna, plans were made to erect a monument to the Mexican War of Independence in the square. In 1843, an 8 m (26 ft) long and 30 cm (12 in) high pedestal was constructed, but the project was abandoned due to the Mexican–American War. As a result, "zócalo" came to be used as a synonym for "square" or "plaza" in Mexican Spanish, and its usage eventually spread throughout the country. The pedestal was eventually buried and remained uncovered until 2017.

In August 2020, system authorities updated the station’s signage to "Zócalo/Tenochtitlan" and announced that the change would be formalized in a civic ceremony. The station was officially renamed on 13 August 2021 to commemorate the 500th anniversary of the fall of Tenochtitlan, the capital of the Aztec Empire. The formal ceremony took place on 19 August, during which Avenida Puente de Alvarado and the nearby Metrobús station, both previously named after the Spanish conquistador Pedro de Alvarado, were also renamed to Calzada México-Tenochtitlan and México Tenochtitlan station, respectively.

=== Incidents ===
On 29 March 1998, a drunk passenger opened fire at users, injuring a security guard who attempted to intervene. Due to its central location, Zócalo/Tenochtitlan station is frequently vandalized by demonstrators, and is commonly closed by authorities for various reasons, including national security concerns, during the COVID-19 pandemic in Mexico, for live events at the Zócalo, and during protests in the area. The station closed 358 times between 2019 and 31 July 2024—covering most of the presidency of Andrés Manuel López Obrador—with 162 closures attributed to the COVID-19 pandemic. These frequent closures have significantly impacted local businesses.

=== Ridership ===
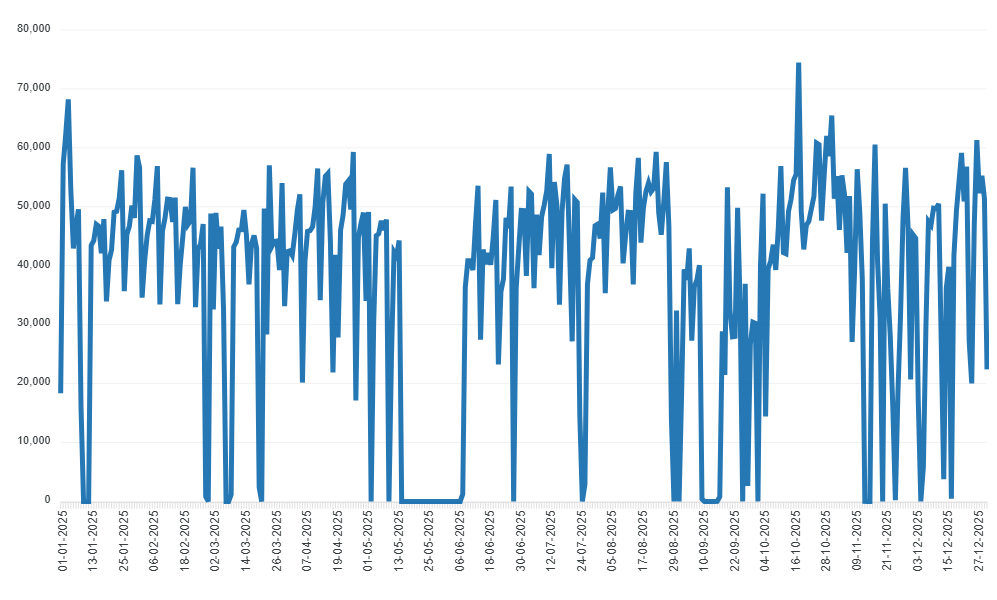
Daily ridership for Zócalo/Tenochtitlan station in 2025

According to official data, before the impact of the COVID-19 pandemic, the station recorded between 70,269 and 72,900 average daily entries from 2016 to 2019. In 2025, it recorded 13,363,036 passenger entries, ranking 14th among the system's 195 stations.

Annual passenger ridership
Year	Ridership	Average daily	Rank	% change	Ref.
2025	13,363,036	36,611	14/195	−4.88%	
2024	14,048,881	38,384	11/195	−11.87%	
2023	15,940,778	43,673	10/195	+15.71%	
2022	13,776,200	37,743	12/195	+115.58%	
2021	6,390,406	17,507	31/195	−10.73%	
2020	7,158,490	19,558	30/195	−72.61%	
2019	26,138,960	71,613	10/195	−1.07%	
2018	26,421,132	72,386	10/195	+3.01%	
2017	25,648,342	70,269	10/195	−3.86%	
2016	26,678,428	72,891	10/195	+1.71%	
