= Antonio Peñafiel =

Antonio Peñafiel Berruecos (1839–1922) was a Mexican medical doctor, scientist and scholar who participated in founding the National Institute of Statistics and Geography, and in studying Mexico's pre-Columbian history and in documenting Native American languages. Born in Atotonilco el Grande in Hidalgo, he entered medical school. From 1873 to 1875 he was a member of national congress representing the state of Hidalgo. From 1882 to 1910 he was director of the Dirección General de Estadísticas (DGE), the Mexican bureau of statistics. In 1895 he directed the first Mexican national census. He was also a founding member of the Mexican Society for Natural History. He published many of the ethnohistorical sources about Mexico's indigenous cultures, and also published his own studies of Mexican placenames. He also published an analysis of the potable water of the Basin of Mexico including chemical analyses. He was elected as a member of the American Philosophical Society in 1886.
