= Cruz de Mañozca =

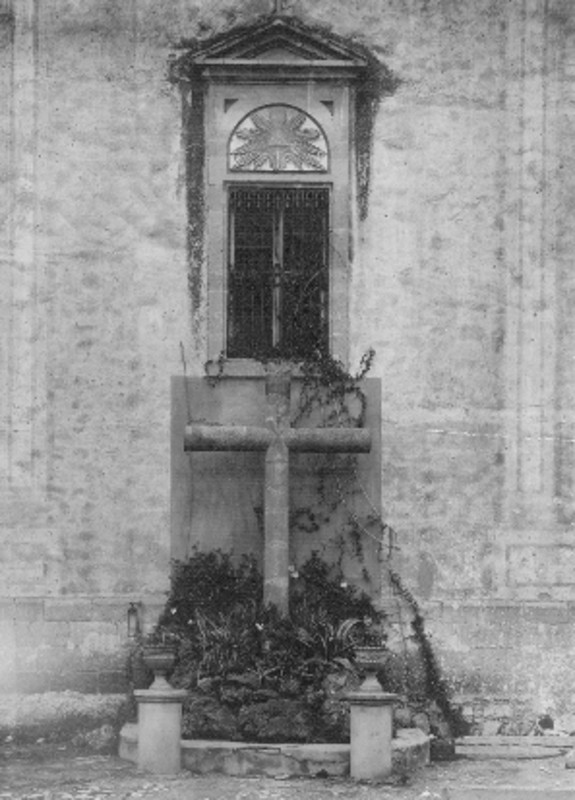
- The cross (c. 1910)
- Interactive map of Cruz de Mañozca
- Coordinates: 19°26′3″N 99°7′57.1″W
- Type: Atrial cross
- Material: Quarry stone
- Height: 3 m (9.8 ft)
- Completion date: 16th century

The Cruz de Mañozca (Mañozca Cross), otherwise known as the Cruz de Tepeapulco (Tepeapulco Cross), is a 16th century atrial stone cross placed in the courtyard of the Mexico City Metropolitan Cathedral, in the historic center of Mexico City, in the Cuauhtémoc Borough. The cross was created for the San Francisco Convent, Tepeapulco, Hidalgo, and was eventually brought to Mexico City at the request of archbishop Juan de Mañozca y Zamora.

== History ==
During the 16th century, during the Spanish colonization of the Americas, Franciscans installed in Tepeapulco, Hidalgo, and built the San Francisco Convent. As was the case with the various temples and churches of the time, atrial crosses were built in the enclosure. The cross was formerly located in the front of the convent, which was abandoned during the 17th century. At the request of archbishop Juan de Mañozca y Zamora, the cross was moved to the cemetery area of the Mexico City Metropolitan Cathedral in 1648. Mañozca y Zamora found it surrounded by weeds and described it as "a cross of red stone masonry, twelve rods high (approximately 10 meters [33 ft]) [...] engraved with great care by the first religious". Since then, the cross has been installed in various areas of the cathedral and is located at the rear of the original cathedral in the Patio de los Canónigos courtyard, whose access is restricted to the public.

== Gallery ==
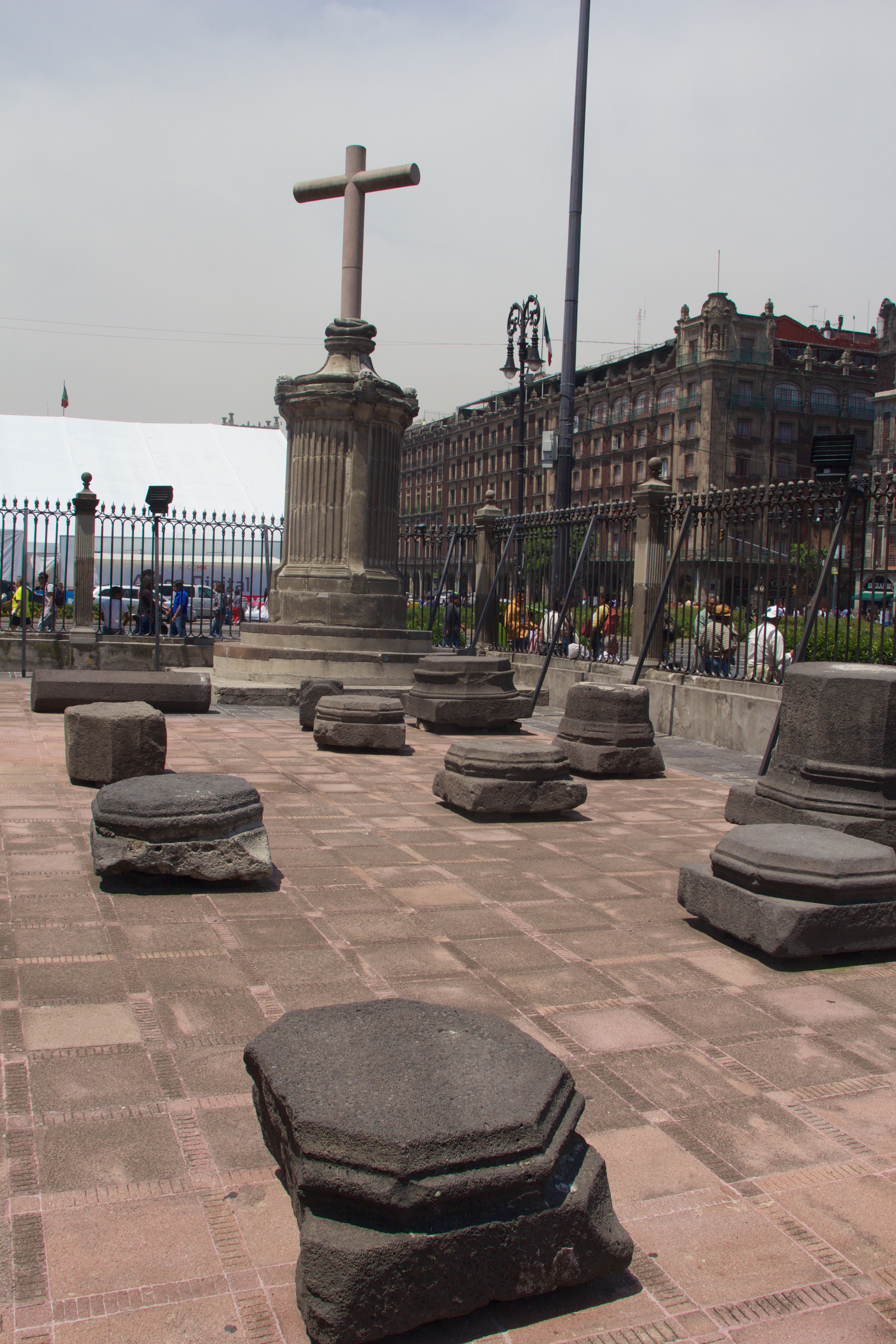
Southwestern atrial cross, where the cross once stood

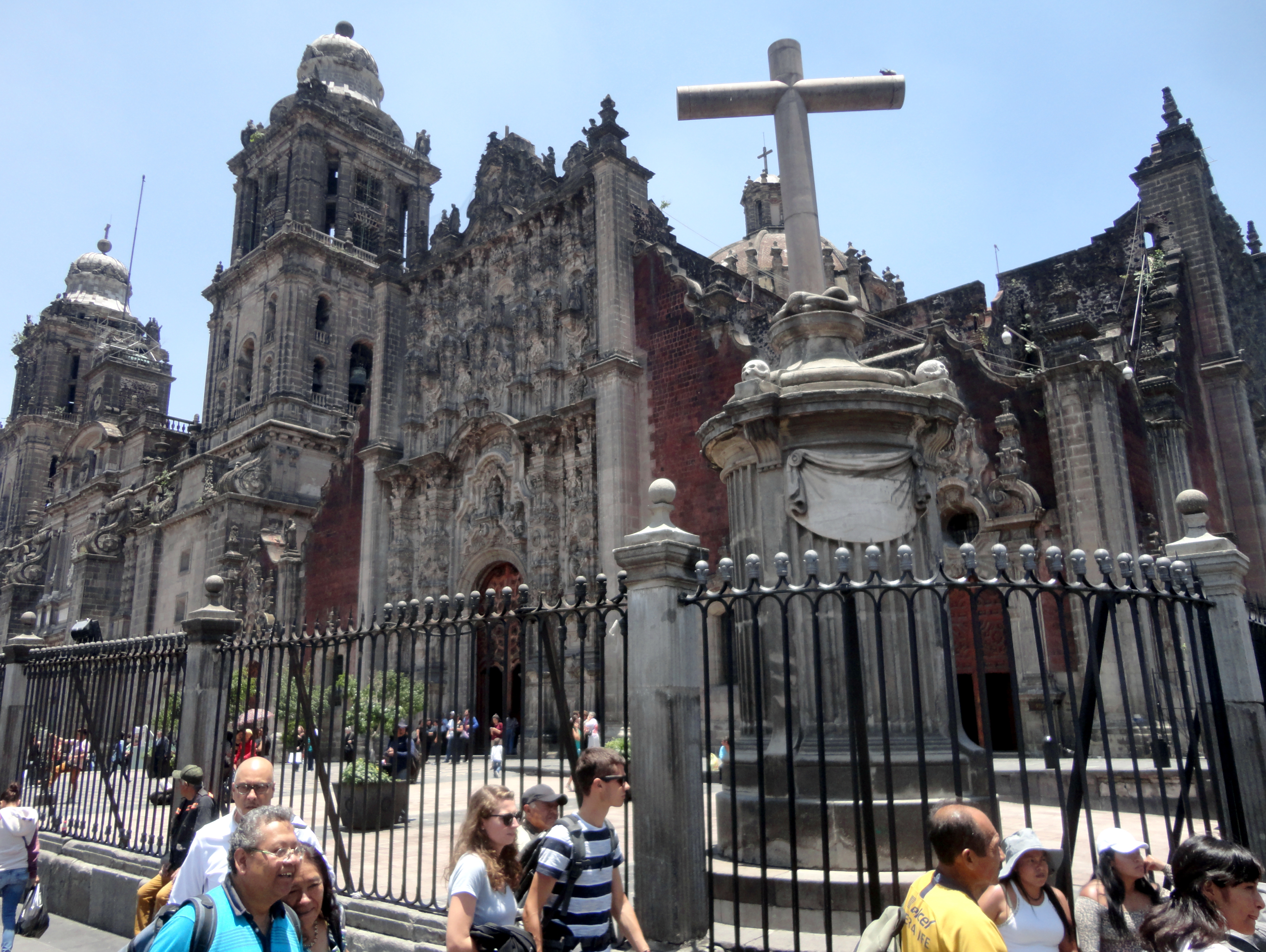
Southeastern atrial cross, where the cross once stood

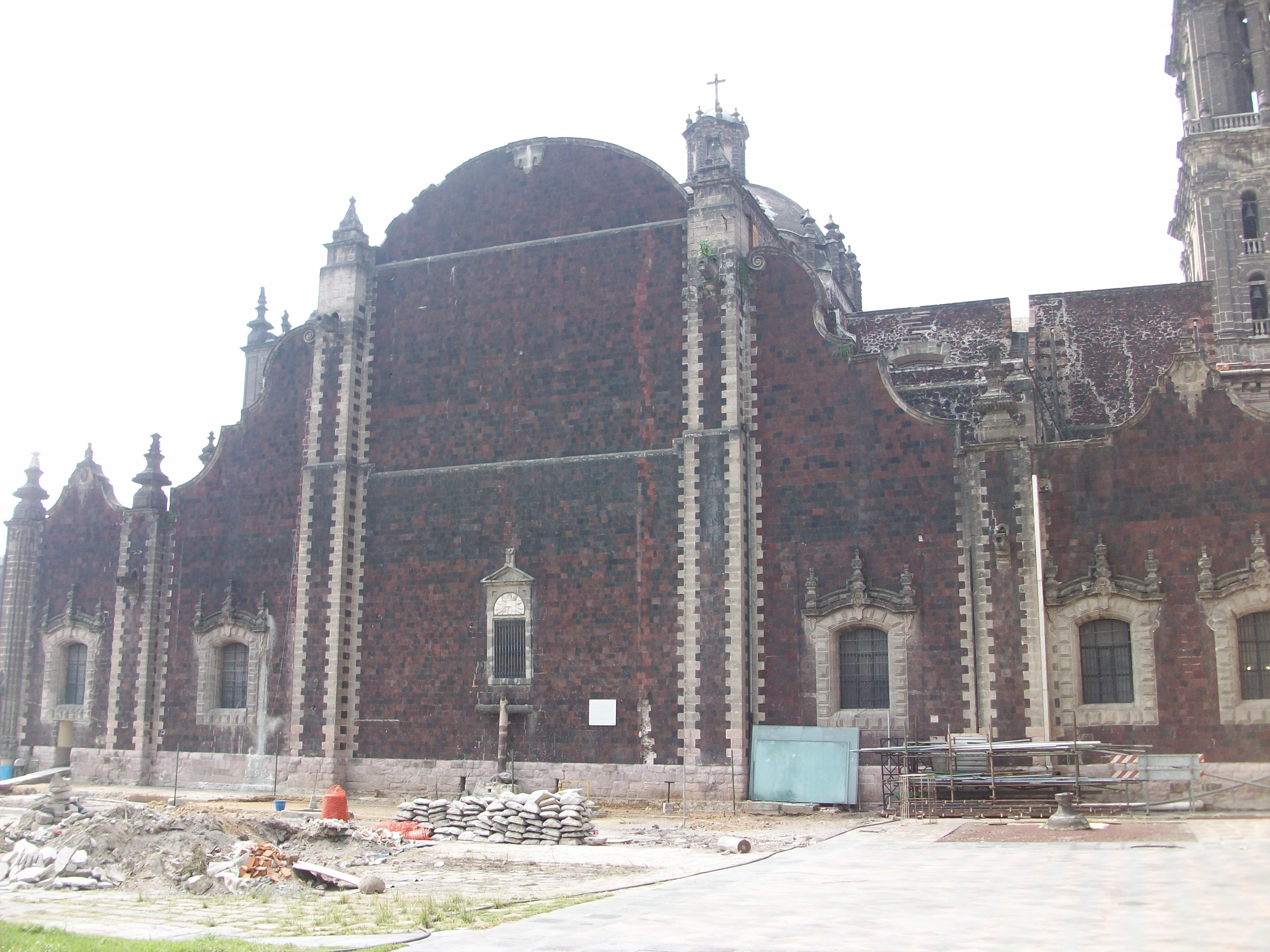
The cross as of 2012
