= Estadio Azteca light rail station =

Xochimilco Light Rail station

Estadio Azteca
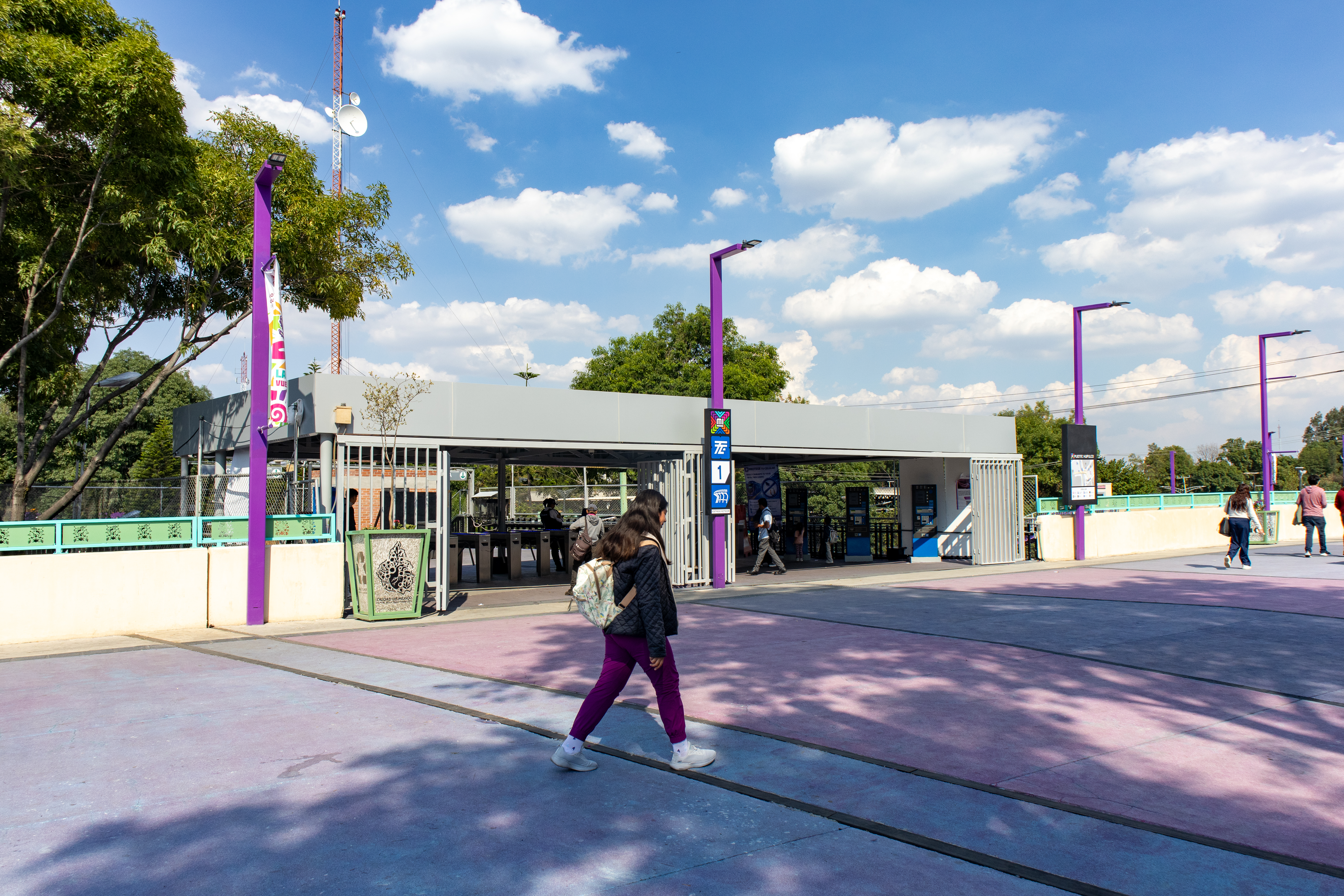
- Station entrance, 2026

General information
- Location: Calzada de Tlalpan; Coyoacán, Mexico City; Mexico
- Coordinates: 19°18′07″N 99°08′49″W
- System: Mexico City Light Rail
- Owner: Government of Mexico City
- Operator: Servicio de Transportes Eléctricos (STE)
- Platforms: 2 island platforms
- Tracks: 3
- Connections: Huipulco; 17-E, 17-F, 31-B, 69, 111-A, 131, 132, 134, 134-A, 134-B, 134-C, 134-D, 145-A, 162-D; 2-F; Line 14

Construction
- Structure type: At grade
- Accessible: Yes

Other information
- Status: In service

History
- Opened: 1 August 1986; 40 years ago

Services
Preceding station	STE	Following station
El Vergel toward Tasqueña	Mexico City Light Rail	Huipulco toward Xochimilco

Former services
Preceding station	STE	Following station
Terminus	Tlalpan branch pre-1992	Huipulco toward Tlalpan
Route map
Location
- Location within Mexico City urban area
- Area map

Estadio Azteca light rail station (Note: Estación Estadio Azteca del Tren Ligero. The name of the station literally means "Aztec Stadium".) is a station of the Mexico City Light Rail in the colonia (neighborhood) of Ejido Viejo de Santa Úrsula Coapa, in the borough of Coyoacán, Mexico City. It is an at-grade station along Calzada de Tlalpan, with two island platforms, being named after and serving the adjacent Azteca Stadium (branded as Banorte Stadium since 2025, and dubbed the "Mexico City Stadium" during the 2026 FIFA World Cup).

The light rail station is found between El Vergel and Huipulco stations. The station's pictogram depicts a stylized view of that stadium. The facilities are accessible to people with disabilities. Outside, the station has a transportation hub servicing local bus routes, and connects with the trolleybus system.

Estadio Azteca station opened on 1 August 1986, providing northward service toward Tasqueña station. It formerly provided a southward service toward the borough of Tlalpan, but it was discontinued in 1990. The station has undergone several renovations, the most recent in anticipation of increased tourist demand for the 2026 FIFA World Cup.

== Location ==
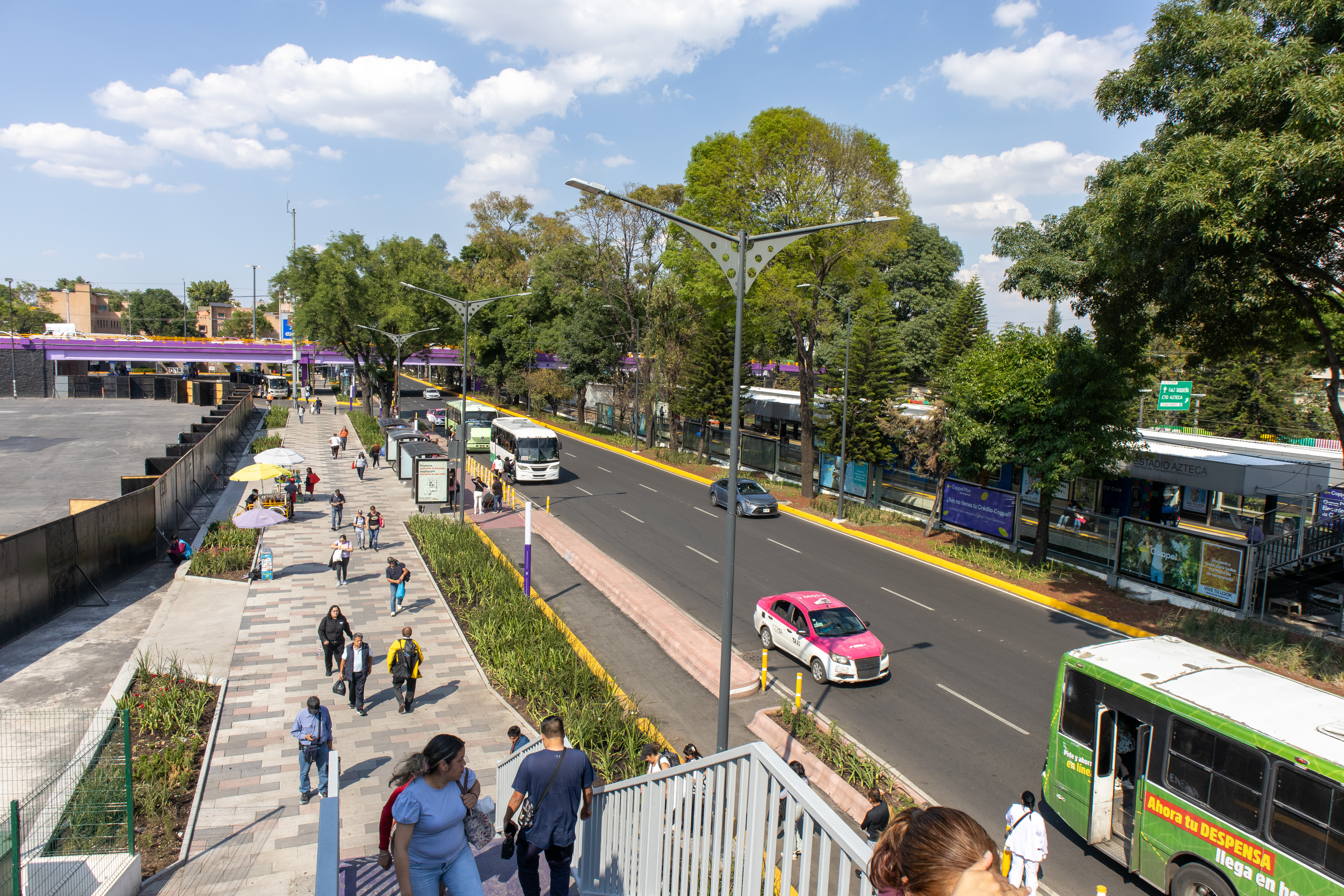
Estadio Azteca station (right) is located at the median strip of Calzada de Tlalpan.

Estadio Azteca is an at-grade light rail station along the median strip of Calzada de Tlalpan, in the borough of Coyoacán, in southern Mexico City. It serves the Colonia ("neighborhood") of Ejido Viejo de Santa Úrsula Coapa. The stop services the Estadio Azteca, from which it takes its name.

Estadio Azteca light rail station is located near the CETRAM Huipulco transportation hub. Commuters can access different bus routes from there, including Routes 17-E, 17-F, 31-B, 69, 111-A, 131, 132, 134, 134-A, 134-B, 134-C, 134-D, 145-A, and 162-D of the Red de Transporte de Pasajeros (RTP) system, as well as Route 2-F of the public bus system. The transportation hub connects with Trolleybus Line 14, which opened on 9 June 2026.

CETRAM Huipulco received maintenance in anticipation of the 2026 FIFA World Cup, which indirectly benefited the light rail station.

== History and layout ==
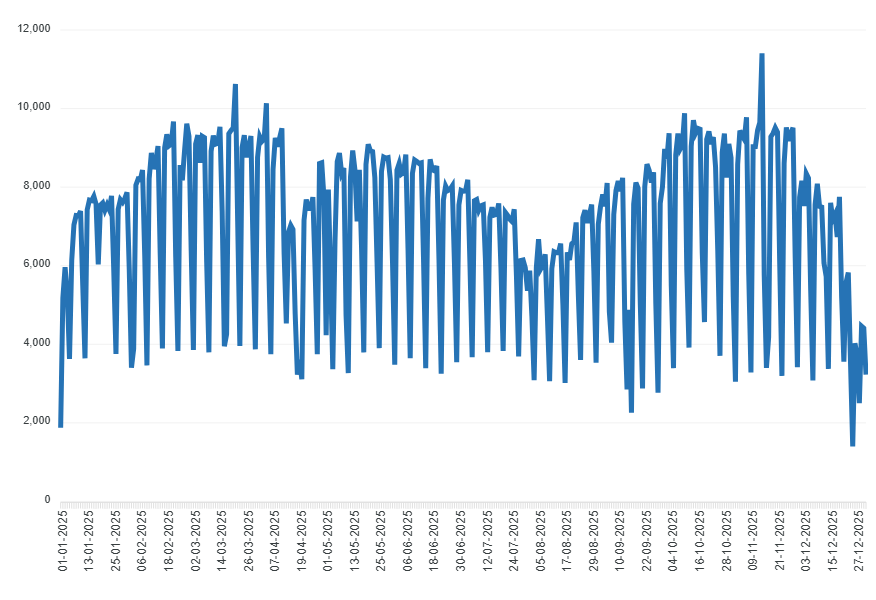
In 2025, station entry ridership ranged from 1,400 to 11,500 passengers.

Estadio Azteca light rail station opened on 1 August 1986, operating toward Tasqueña station. Within the system, Estadio Azteca lies between El Vergel and Huipulco stations.

In the same year, the station served as a transfer station providing service toward San Fernando, Tlalpan, a service that was discontinued in 1990. The remnants of that light rail were still standing as of 2021.

The station was out of service from 1 July 2019 until 16 January 2020, due to a major rehabilitation of the system, making the replacement of tracks that have remained since the mid-1890s, when they were used for the former tram route. The works were completed on 31 December 2019. The official reopening took place on 16 January 2020.

=== Incidents ===
On 6 July 2001, at 9:15 a.m. (UTC−6), a train collided with three minibuses, a car, a police officer, and a cyclist, killing two people – the cyclist and the car driver – and injuring five others. The train had departed from Estadio Azteca station and was traveling at 51.6 kilometers per hour (32.1 mph) toward El Vergel station when it crashed at the intersection with Calle Tlalmanalco, where trains were required to travel at 20 kilometers per hour (12 mph).
