= Estadio Azteca =

Stadium in Mexico City

Estadio Azteca Aztec Stadium
- El Coloso de Santa Úrsula "The Colossus of Santa Úrsula"
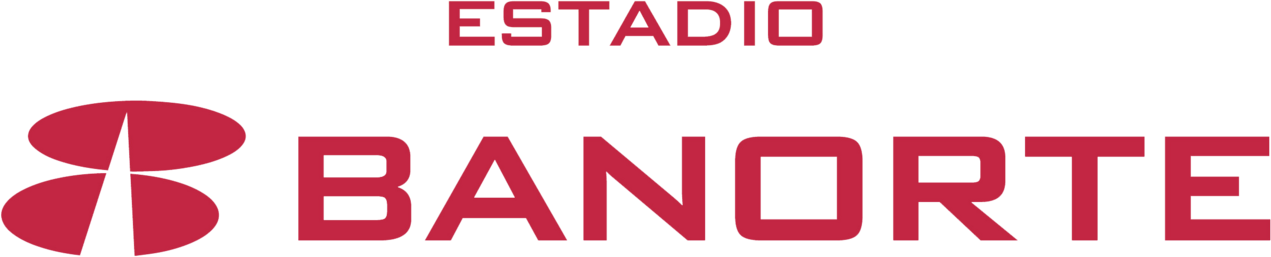

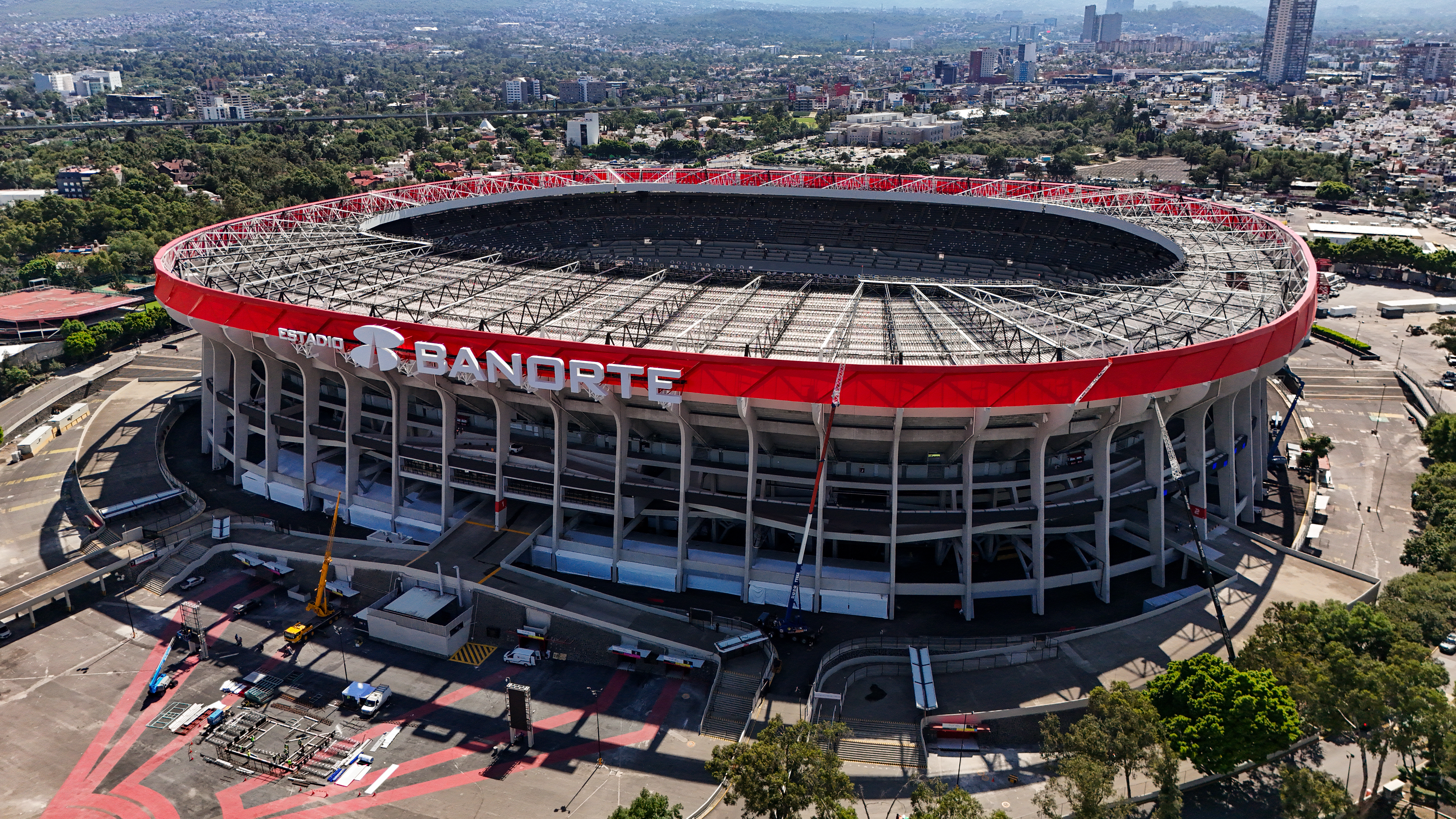
- Aerial view from east in 2026
- Interactive map of Estadio Azteca; Aztec Stadium
- Former names: Estadio Azteca (1966–1997, 1999–2025); Estadio Guillermo Cañedo (1997–1998); Estadio Ciudad de México (2026 FIFA World Cup)
- Location: Calzada de Tlalpan, Coyoacán, Mexico City, Mexico
- Coordinates: 19.3030°N 99.1505°W
- Elevation: 2,241 m (7,350 ft) AMSL
- Owner: Televisa
- Operator: Ollamani, S.A.B.
- Capacity: 87,523; 80,824 (2026 FIFA World Cup); 114,600 (1986 FIFA World Cup); 107,247 (1970 FIFA World Cup)
- Executive suites: 856
- Surface: GrassMaster
- Scoreboard: Panasonic
- Record attendance: Football: 119,853 (Mexico vs Brazil, 7 July 1968); Boxing: 132,247 (Julio César Chávez vs Greg Haugen, 20 February 1993)
- Field size: 105 m × 68 m (115 yd × 74 yd)
- Public transit: Estadio Azteca light rail station CETRAM Huipulco

Construction
- Groundbreaking: 1961
- Opened: 29 May 1966; 60 years ago
- Renovated: 1986, 1999, 2013, 2016, 2024–2026
- Cost: MXN$260 million
- Architects: Pedro Ramírez Vázquez; Rafael Mijares Alcérreca

Tenants
- Club América (1966–present); Cruz Azul (1971–1996, 2018–2023, 2026–present); Mexico national football team (1966–present) & (selected matches); Necaxa (1966–1971, 1982–2003); Atlante (1966–1982, 1996–2001, 2004–2007, 2026–present); Atlético Español (1971–1982)

Website
- estadiobanorte.com.mx

Estadio Azteca (Latin American Spanish: [esˈtaðjo asˈteka]), officially known as Estadio Banorte for sponsorship reasons, is a football stadium located in Coyoacán, Mexico City. At an elevation of 2,241 meters (7,352 ft) above sea level it is the official home of Club América of Liga MX and the Mexico national team. With a capacity of 87,523, it is the largest stadium in Latin America and the eighth-largest association football stadium in the world.

One of the best known football stadiums in the world, often called the "Temple of Football" or the "Cathedral of Football", it was the first to host two FIFA World Cup finals; Brazil defeated Italy 4–1 in 1970 and Argentina beat West Germany 3–2 in 1986. It also hosted the 1986 quarter-final match between Argentina and England in which Diego Maradona scored both the "Hand of God goal" and the "Goal of the Century".

Both Pelé's (1970) and Diego Maradona's (1986) national teams won the FIFA World Cup in Estadio Azteca. It also hosted the "Game of the Century", when Italy defeated West Germany 4–3 in extra time in one of the 1970 semifinal matches. The stadium was the principal venue for the football tournament of the 1968 Summer Olympics and the 1971 Women's World Cup. It also hosted games during the 2026 FIFA World Cup, including the opening game where South Africa played against Mexico, making it the only stadium to host three editions of the FIFA World Cup. Additionally, the National Football League (NFL) of the United States features one game of American football at the stadium per season as a part of its International Series.

== History ==
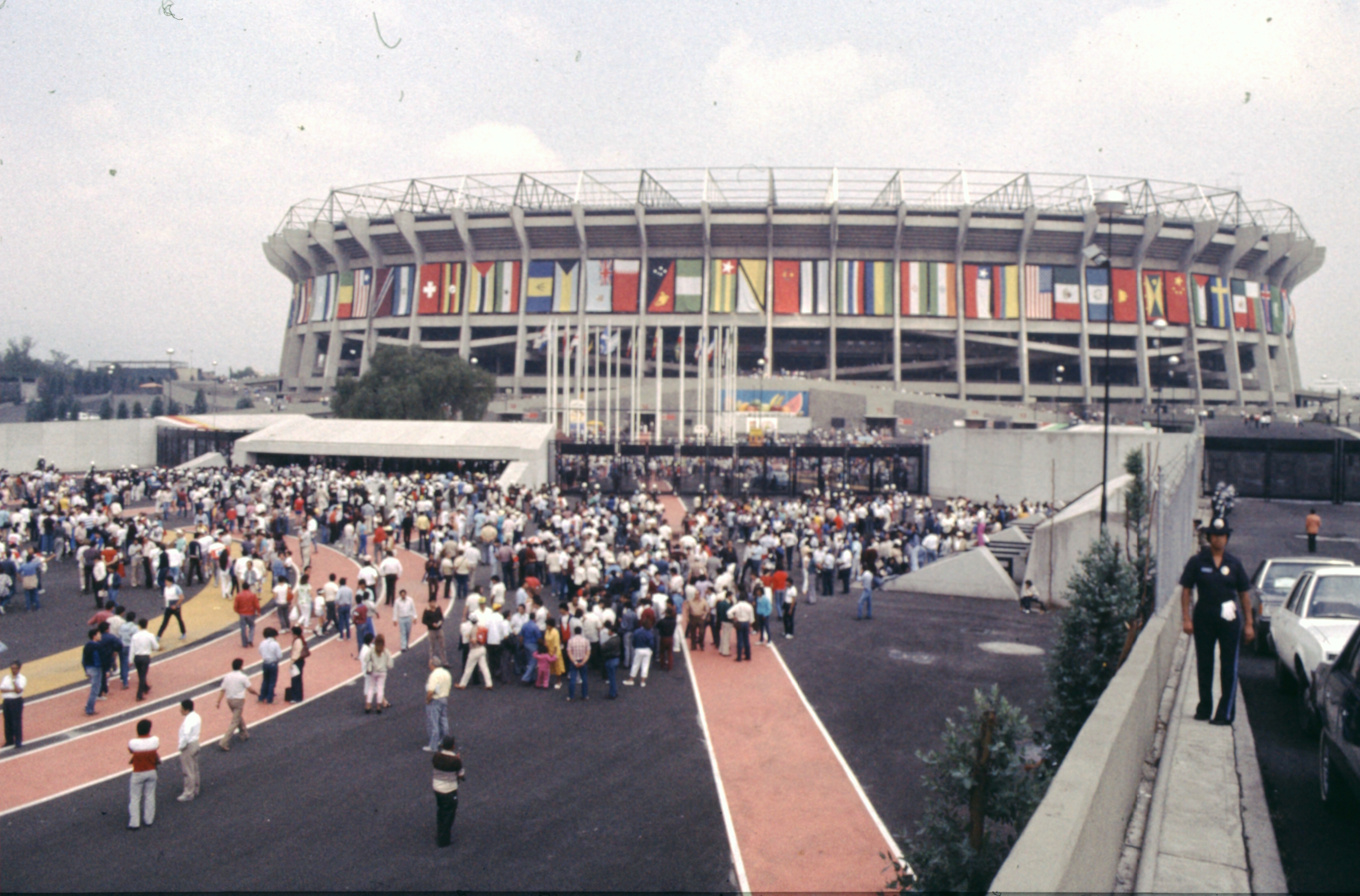
Spectators outside the Azteca during the 1986 FIFA World Cup

Estadio Azteca was envisioned as a major sports venue during the presidency of Adolfo López Mateos; Mexico was awarded the 1968 Summer Olympics in 1963, and the football final was held there. Designed by architects Pedro Ramírez Vázquez and Rafael Mijares Alcérreca, the stadium broke ground in 1961 and the inaugural match was between Club América and Torino F.C. on 29 May 1966, with a capacity for 107,494 spectators. The first goal was scored by Brazilian Arlindo Dos Santos and the second one by Brazilian José Alves; later, the Italians tied the game, which ended in a 2–2 draw. Mexican president Gustavo Díaz Ordaz made the initial kick and FIFA president Sir Stanley Rous was the witness.

A modern illumination system was inaugurated on 5 June 1966, with the first night game played between Spanish side Valencia C.F. and Necaxa. The first goal of the match was scored by Honduran José Cardona for Valencia. Roberto Martínez, aka Caña Brava, became the first Mexican to score a goal in the stadium after scoring for Necaxa. The result was a 3–1 victory for Valencia. In 1978, the stadium hosted the final of the Copa Interamericana between América and Boca Juniors of Argentina, and again in 1990 between América and Club Olimpia of Paraguay.

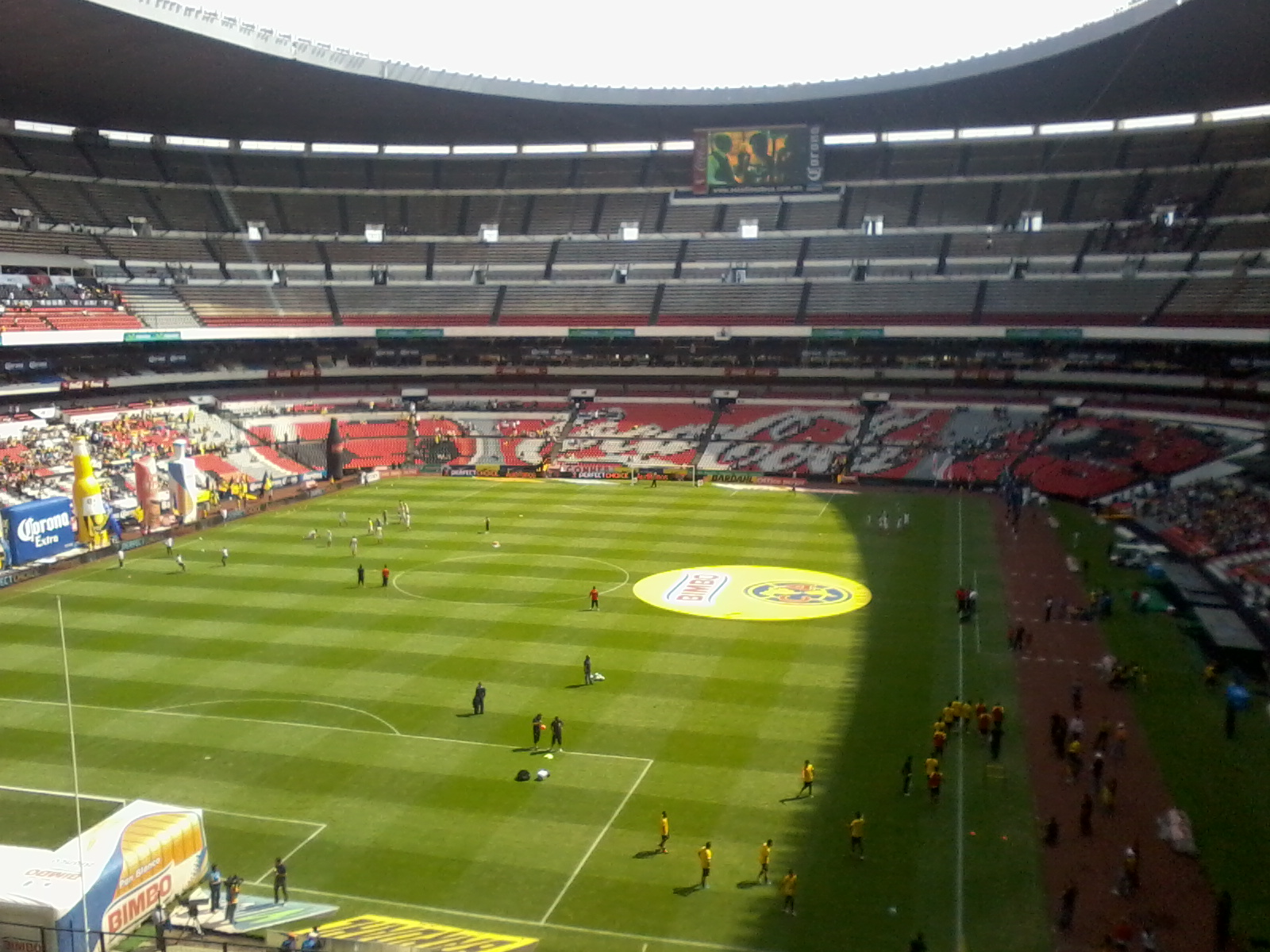
Interior of the stadium prior to a match between Club América and Tijuana, 25 September 2011

The venue is where superstars Pelé (1970) and Diego Maradona (1986) lifted the FIFA World Cup Trophy for the last time. Estadio Azteca has also been used for musical performances throughout its history. Michael Jackson (5 sold-out shows in 1993), Menudo (in 1983), U2 (in 2006 and 2011), Luis Miguel (in 2002), Paul McCartney (in 2012 and 2017), Elton John, Maná, Juan Gabriel, Gloria Estefan, Jaguares, Lenny Kravitz, *Nsync, Hanson, Ana Gabriel, and The Three Tenors all have become part of the stadium's main spectacle. The stadium has also been used for political events, including Mexican president Felipe Calderón's campaign closure in 2006, as well as religious events, such as Jehovah's Witnesses conventions and the appearance of Pope John Paul II in 1999.

In April 2017, it was announced that starting July 2018, Cruz Azul would relocate to the Azteca on a temporary basis, due to the impending demolition of the Estadio Azul. The stadium hosted multiple matches during the 2026 FIFA World Cup, including the opener. It was the third World Cup for Azteca, which hosted the final match in both 1970 and 1986.

=== 2015–19 renovation project ===
The stadium has undergone gradual improvements and renovations, including the replacing of seating within the stadium as well as the installation of electronic advertising boards. In May 2015, modern Panasonic LED panels were installed at the north and south ends of the stadium, replacing the phosphorus panels installed in 1998.

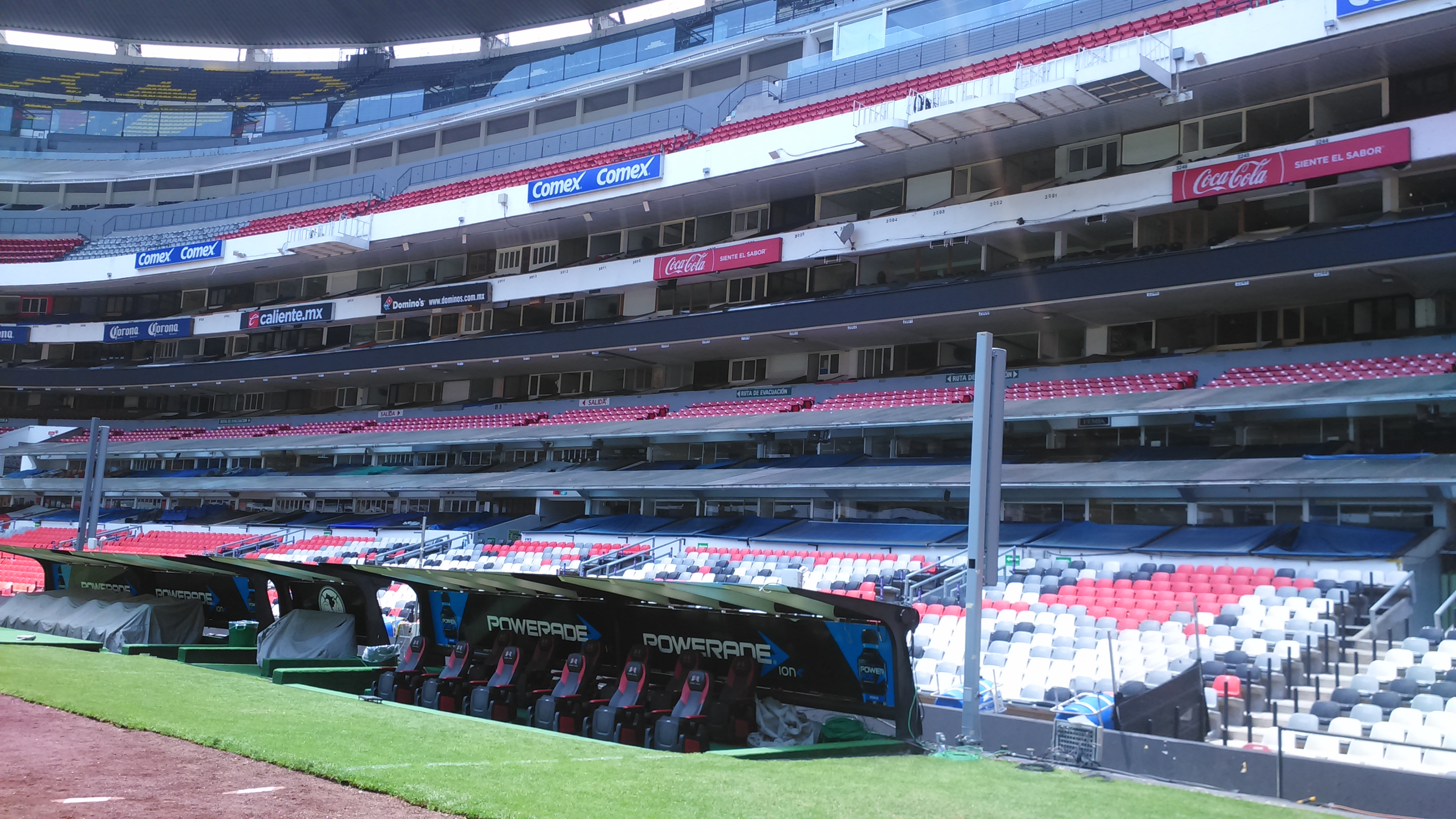
Bench area and side stand

In February 2015, a vast renovation plan was unveiled with the intention that the completion of the project coincide with the stadium's 50th anniversary and with Club América's centenary in 2016, as well as the construction of a commercial hub outside the stadium to be completed some time in 2019. It was reported that Televisa, owners of the stadium, approved a joint-venture bid from private development firms IQ Real Estate and Alhel. The hub, named "Foro Azteca", would reportedly consist of a mall, office spaces, two hotels, new leisure spaces, and parking spaces for 2,500 cars. The planned building of the hub was ultimately abandoned. The renovations to the stadium were planned in two phases: the first saw the demolition of the restaurant and seating at the lower east stand and the construction of a new hospitality area with dining and banqueting spaces, and the second saw the construction of new media boxes and private skyboxes at the upper west stand. The renovations to the stadium were completed in November 2016, with the seating capacity ultimately reduced to 81,070.

=== 2026 World Cup and renovation works ===
The stadium was renamed from Azteca (logo above) to Banorte during the renovations

Mexico City was formally announced as a host city for the 2026 FIFA World Cup in June 2020 when FIFA announced the host cities for the tournament. Mexico City was one of three host cities in Mexico and one of sixteen host cities overall for the tournament which was staged across the United States, Canada and Mexico. On 4 February 2024, it was revealed that the stadium would host the opening match of both Mexico and the tournament on 11 June 2026. In total, the stadium hosted five matches: three group stage matches, one Round of 32 match, and one Round of 16 match, hosting four of Mexico's games as winners of Group A.

A major renovation for the tournament, delayed several times due to financing and access issues, began with the stadium's closure in May 2024. The seating capacity was increased from 83,000 to 87,500 spectators, new video screens were installed, and a hybrid turf pitch was laid. The renovation plan included refurbishing the stadium facade, the installation of LED lighting, new locker rooms under the suites, and a tunnel for the players. High-resolution LED screens were to be installed throughout the stadium, and the seats in the stands would be replaced. Special lounges in the lower part of the stadium were also removed to provide more space in the stands.

The stadium was planned to be structurally reinforced by building two large areas on the sides that will serve as bars. The roof was planned to be renovated, which has reportedly not been repaired for a long time and suffers from leaking. In addition to renovations of the stadium itself, works to the neighborhood were also proposed, however those plans were scaled down after residents of the surrounding area complained about the project. In March 2025, FIFA was accused by Building and Wood Workers' International labor union of not allowing their members to inspect safety regulations taking place during the renovations.

Estadio Azteca reopened on 28 March 2026 with a friendly between Mexico and Portugal that ended in a scoreless draw. A spectator died during the pre-match ceremonies after an apparent fall from a box suite. The renovated stadium was criticized by The Athletic for uneven concrete work, unfinished furnishings, and a chaotic security queue. In May 2026, the stadium was monitored by NASA amid concerns about the structural stability of the stadium.

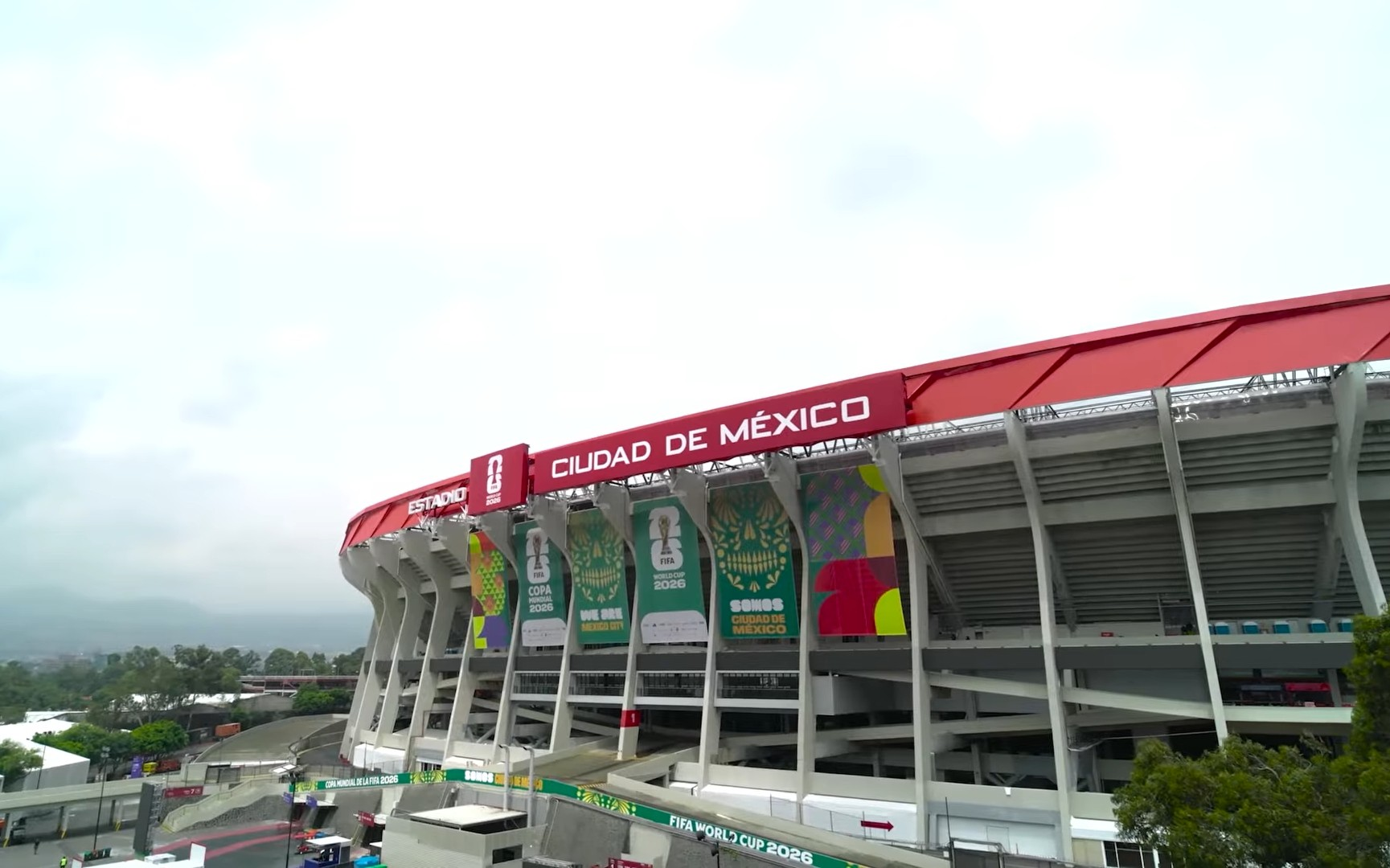
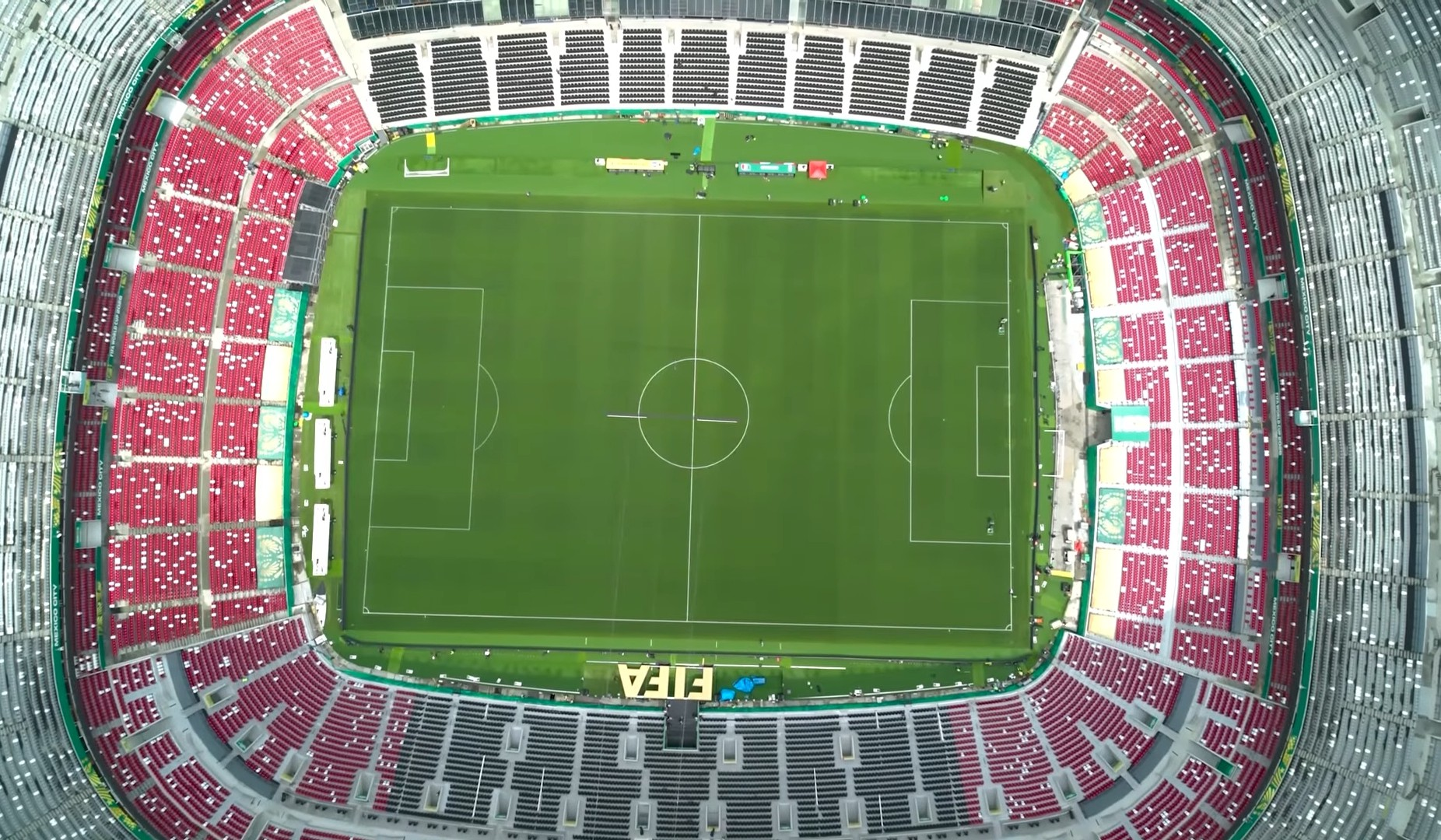
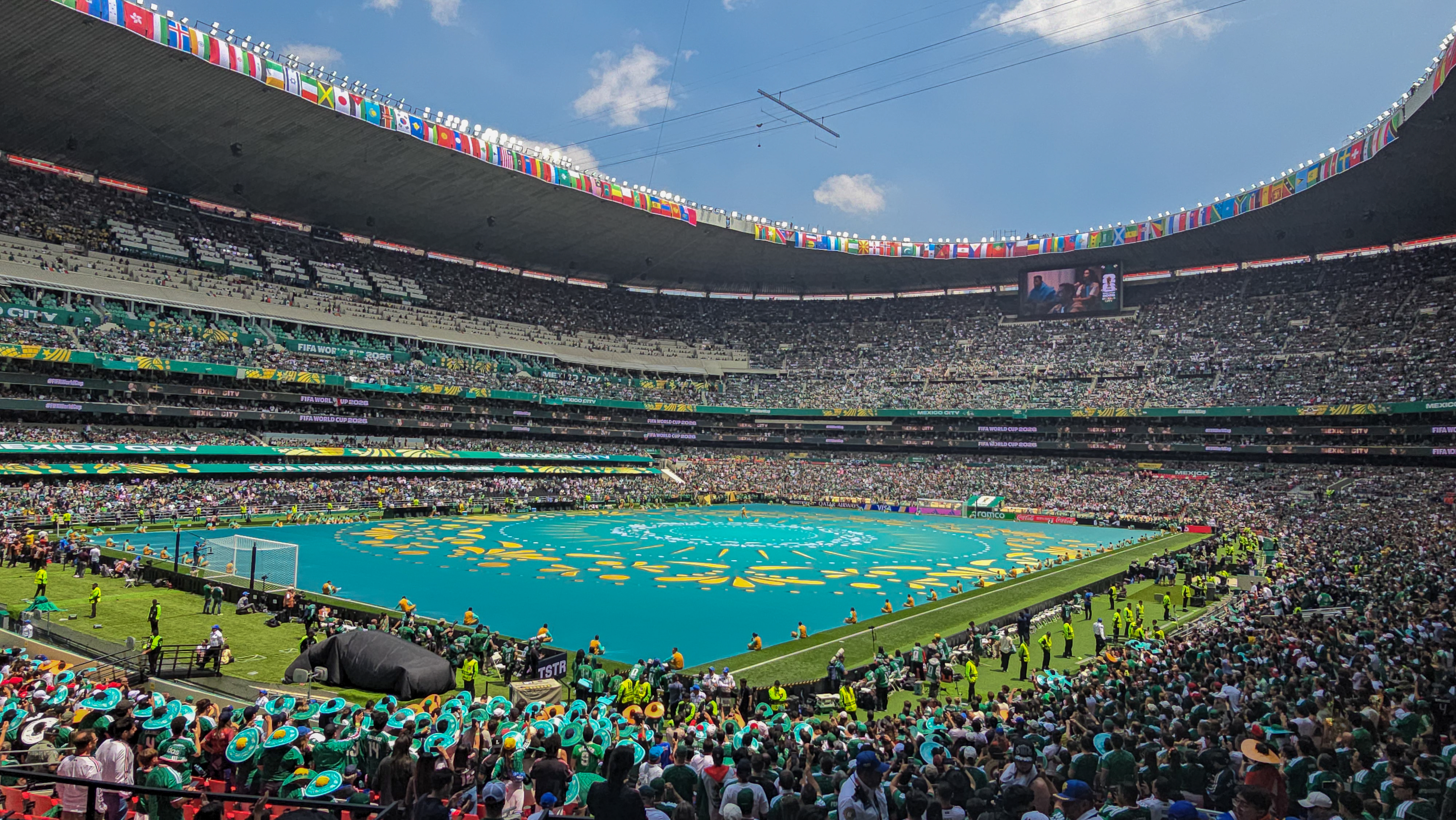
The stadium on 11 June 2026, prior to the opening match of the 2026 FIFA World Cup and inside the stadium during the opening ceremony

On 11 June 2026, the opening match of the 2026 FIFA World Cup was held at the Azteca, in which Mexico played against South Africa. The first goal was scored by Mexico's Julián Quiñones in the ninth minute of the match, this being the first time a player from a CONCACAF national team scored the first goal of a FIFA World Cup edition. The match ended with Mexico winning by 2–0.

That same day, an opening ceremony was held before the match, which included performances by Maná, playing "Oye Mi Amor" with indigenous dancers surrounding the stage. Afterwards, Danny Ocean performed "Partidazo" surrounded by female dancers dressed in china poblana dresses. This was followed by Los Ángeles Azules and Belinda performing "Por Ella" surrounded by male dancers dressed in charro outfits and performing a stylized version of the jarabe with the female dancers, followed by J Balvin and Ryan Castro performing a medley of songs including "Qué Calor", "Una a la Vez", and "I Like It", surrounded by dancers in suits matching the color scheme of the tournament. Shakira and Burna Boy closed the ceremony with a performance of the tournament's official song "Dai Dai" followed by flairs in the colors of the Mexican flag and a fireworks display.

== Name ==
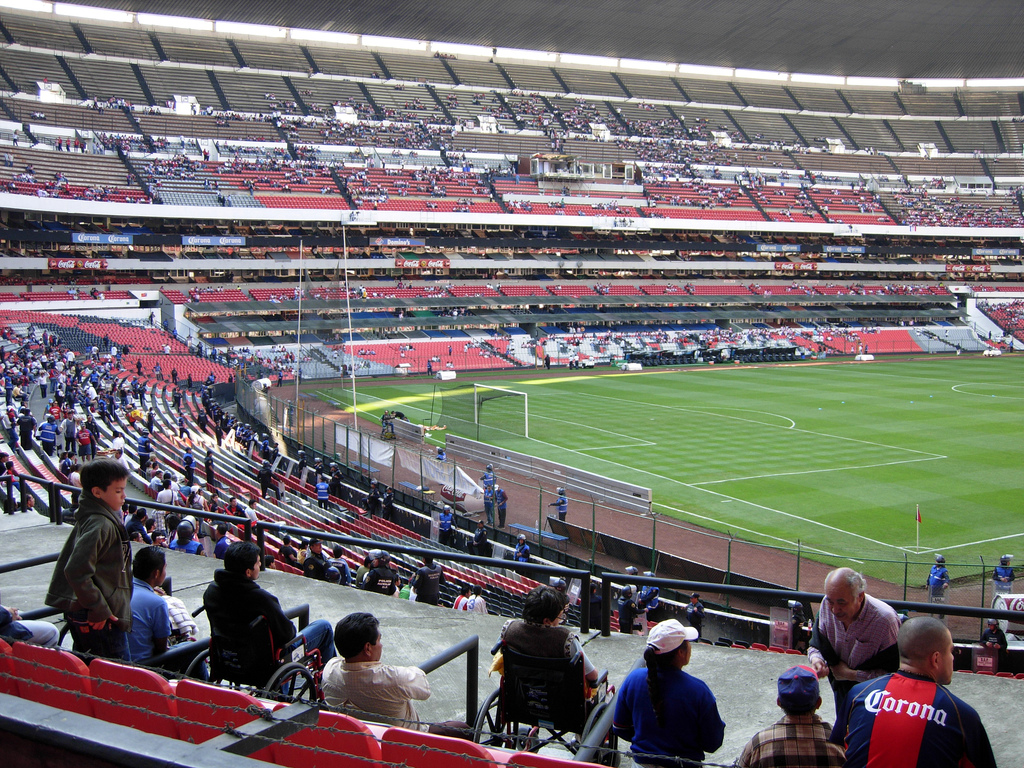
Estadio Azteca prior to a kickoff

The name "Azteca" is a tribute to the Aztec heritage of Mexico City. The stadium is currently owned by Mexican multimedia conglomerate Televisa. In January 1997, Televisa officially changed the stadium's name to Estadio Guillermo Cañedo, in tribute to Guillermo Cañedo de la Bárcena, a top network executive, former Mexican Football Federation president, and a prominent member of the FIFA executive committee who had died earlier that month. After the change proved to be unpopular with the public, Televisa returned to referring to it solely as Estadio Azteca. The stadium is also referred to by the nickname "Coloso de Santa Úrsula" ("Colossus of Santa Ursula"), due to its large structure and Santa Úrsula referring to the suburb where the stadium is located.

On 14 March 2025, Banorte bought the naming rights to the stadium, which helped fund the renovations for the 2026 FIFA World Cup, and renamed it Estadio Banorte. The name was immediately met with overwhelming negative reception. During the 2026 FIFA World Cup, the stadium was called "Mexico City Stadium" (Estadio Ciudad de México) in accordance with FIFA's policy on corporate sponsored names.

== Access, transportation, and entrance ==
It is served by Estadio Azteca station on the Mexico City Light Rail line. This line is an extension of the Mexico City Metro system which begins at Tasqueña light rail station station—connecting with the metro at the Tasqueña metro station—and ends in the Xochimilco light rail station. A bikeway, named Ciclovía La Gran Tenochtitlán, services the area. A nearby transportation hub, CETRAM Huipulco (es), offers local city bus routes. Tickets are available up until kick-off times from the ticket office which is located at the front of the stadium, located towards the exit ramps from the Azteca station. Prices start from as little as MXN$100 (about US$5 as of 2016), and could cost up to MXN$500 (about US$26 as of 2016) for more high-profile matches.

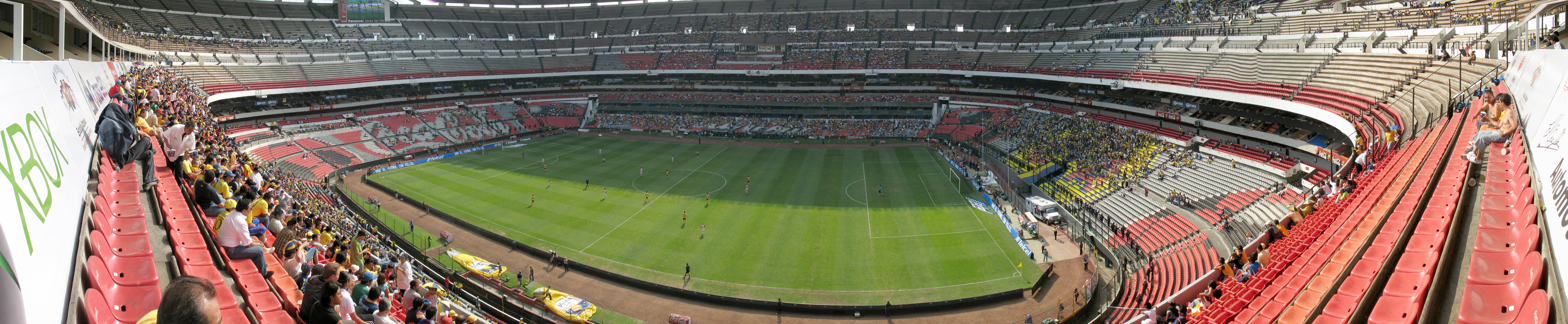
A panorama of Estadio Azteca during a Club América match (Mexico City) vs Tecos (Guadalajara),

== Monuments and memorials ==
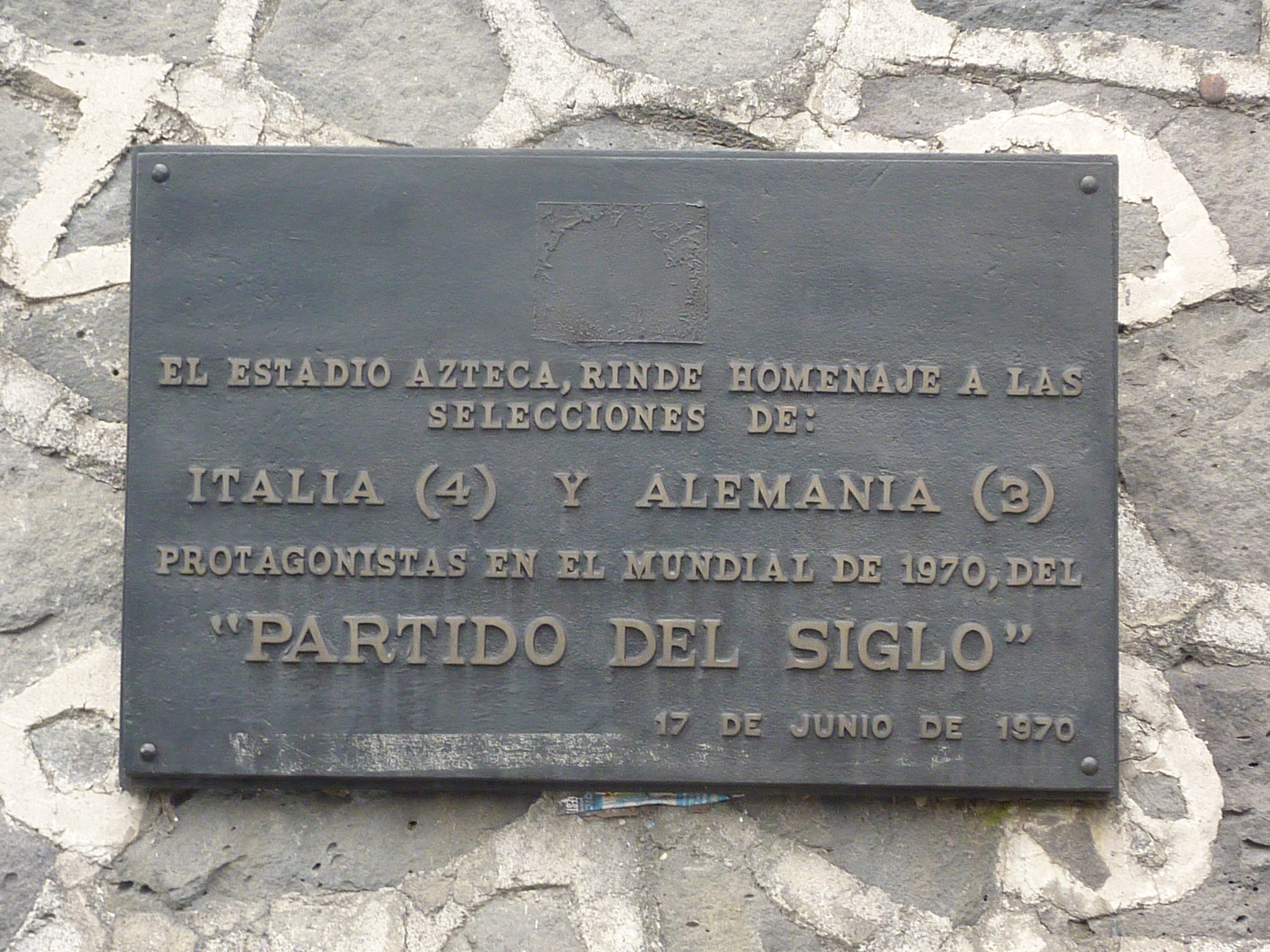
Plaque commemorating the "Game of the Century"

A commemorative bronze plaque of the "Game of the Century" played between Italy and West Germany, as well as Diego Maradona's "Goal of the Century" against England. There is also a commemorative plaque with the names of the first goal scorer in the inaugural match and in the first match played at night.

== Notable events ==
=== FIFA World Cups ===
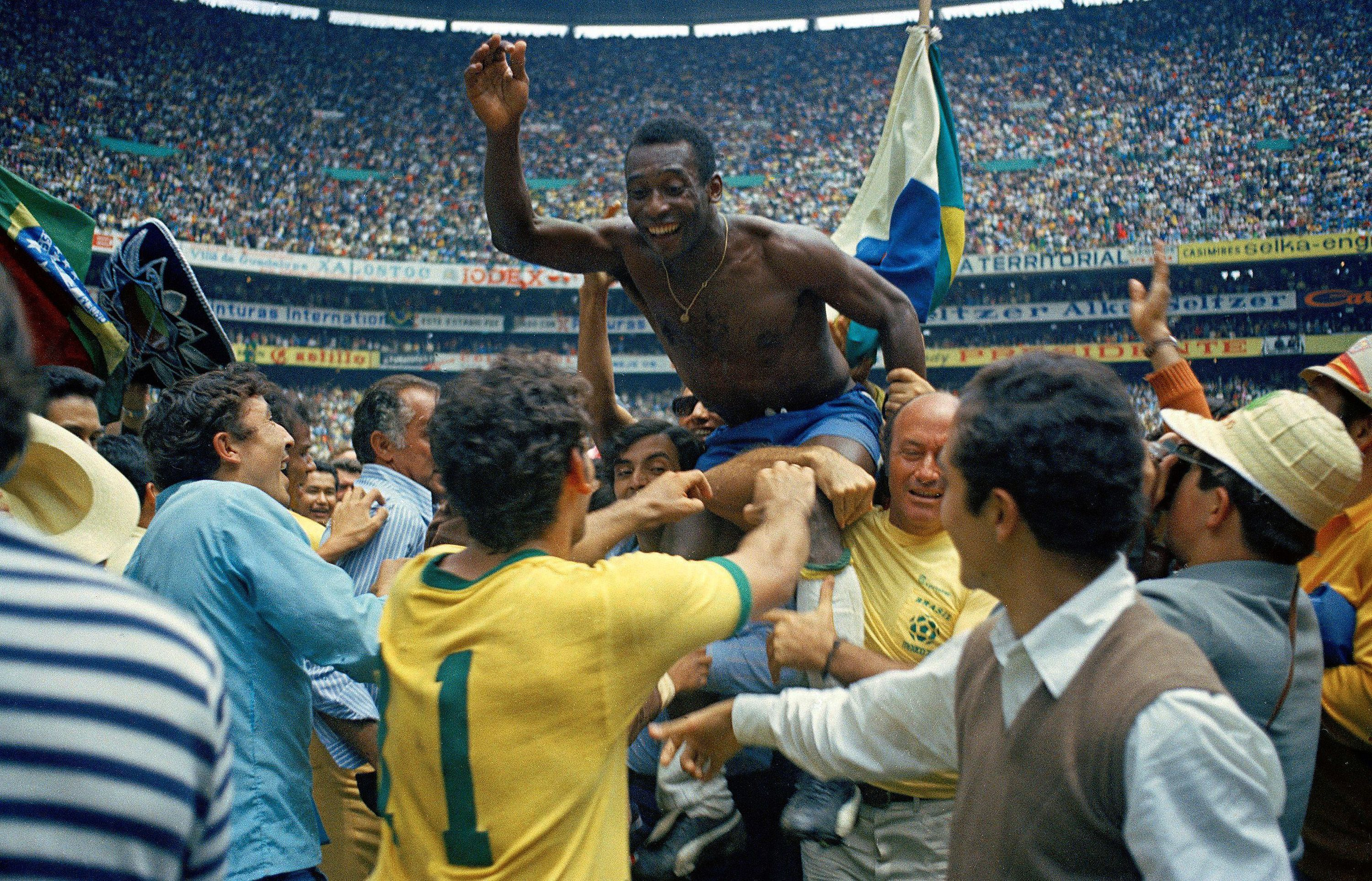
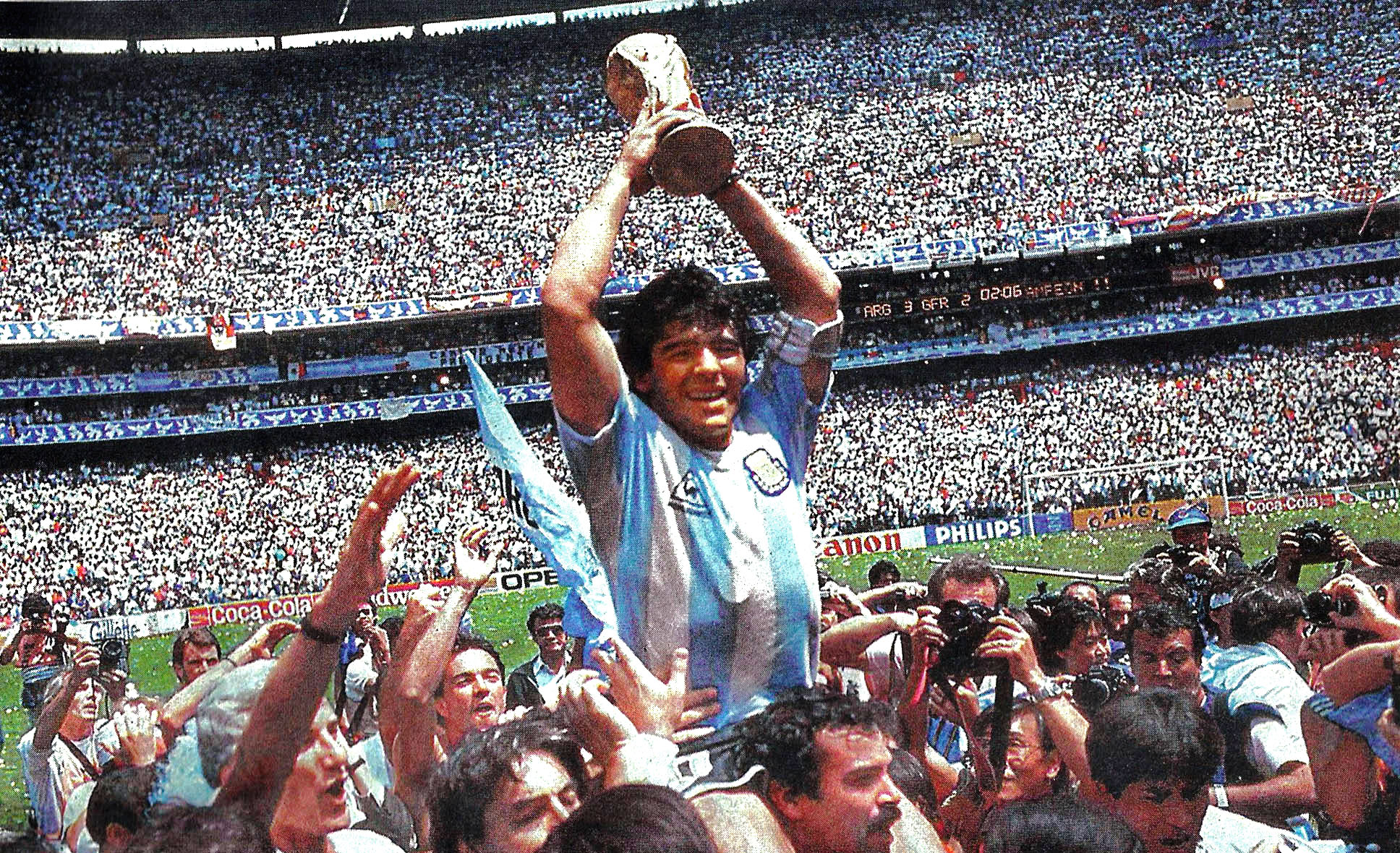
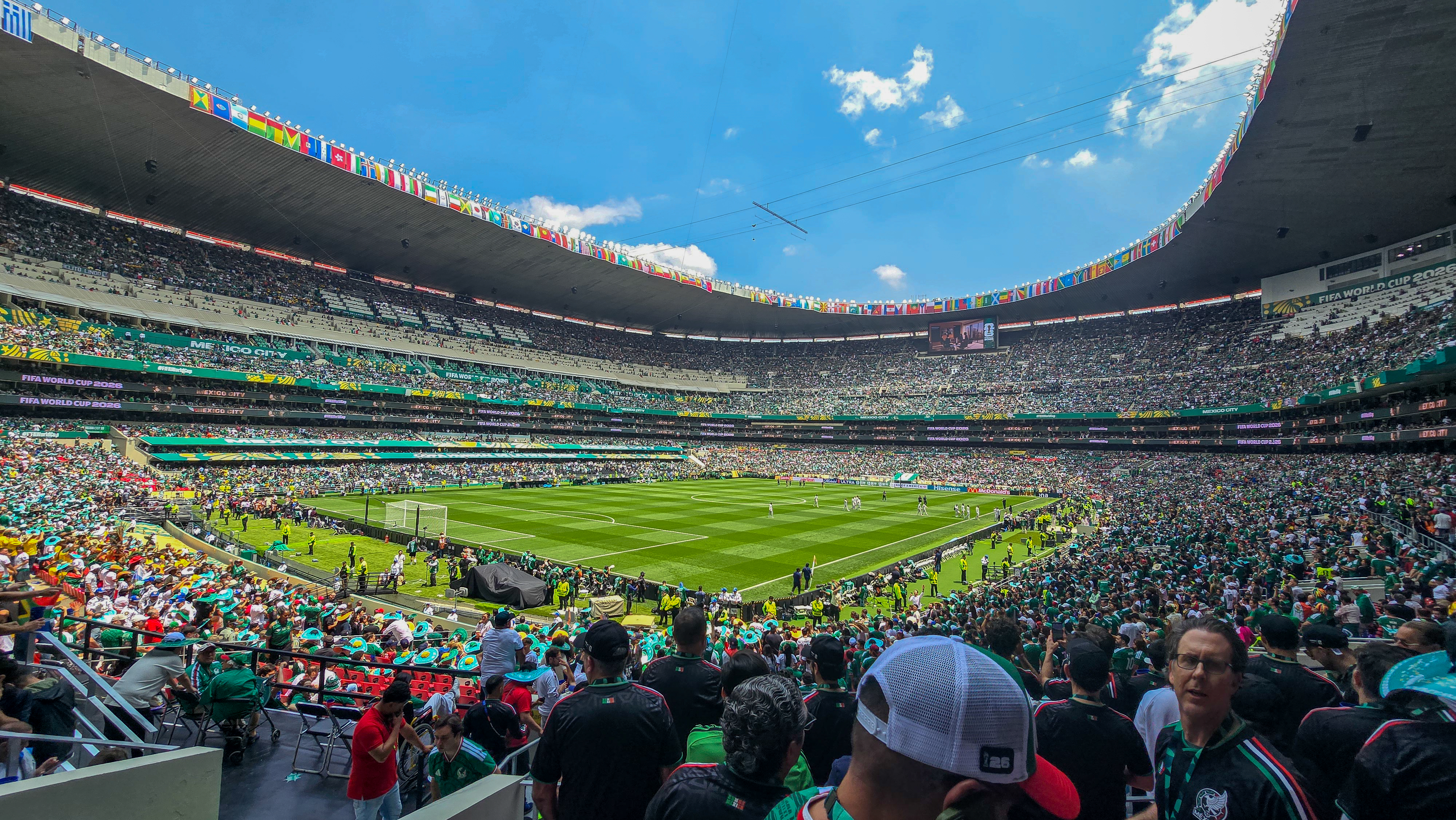
Pelé in 1970 (top) and Diego Maradona in 1986 (middle), celebrate winning the FIFA World Cup at the stadium, and the opening match of the 2026 FIFA World Cup (bottom)

Estadio Azteca has hosted the FIFA World Cup on three occasions, hosting a total of 24 FIFA World Cup matches overall. The stadium hosted ten matches during the 1970 FIFA World Cup including the final. Sixteen years later the stadium hosted nine matches during the 1986 FIFA World Cup, including the final which was the second FIFA World Cup final to be played at the stadium. Estadio Azteca hosted five matches during the 2026 FIFA World Cup (including the opening ceremony) which made the stadium the only one to have hosted the tournament on three occasions.

==== List of 1970 FIFA World Cup matches ====
Date	Time (UTC−6)	Team #1	Res.	Team #2	Round	Attendance
31 May 1970	12:00	Mexico	0–0	Soviet Union	Group 1	107,160
3 June 1970	16:00	Belgium	3–0	El Salvador	Group 1	92,205
6 June 1970	16:00	Soviet Union	4–1	Belgium	Group 1	95,261
7 June 1970	12:00	Mexico	4–0	El Salvador	Group 1	103,058
10 June 1970	16:00	Soviet Union	2–0	El Salvador	Group 1	89,979
11 June 1970	16:00	Mexico	1–0	Belgium	Group 1	108,192
14 June 1970	12:00	Soviet Union	0–1	Uruguay	Quarter-finals	26,085
17 June 1970	16:00	Italy	4–3	West Germany	Semi-finals	102,444
20 June 1970	16:00	Uruguay	0–1	West Germany	3rd place match	104,403
21 June 1970	12:00	Brazil	4–1	Italy	Final	107,412

==== List of 1986 FIFA World Cup matches ====
Date	Time (UTC−6)	Team #1	Res.	Team #2	Round	Attendance
31 May 1986	12:00	Bulgaria	1–1	Italy	Group A	96,000
3 June 1986	12:00	Belgium	1–2	Mexico	Group B	110,000
7 June 1986	12:00	Mexico	1–1	Paraguay	Group B	114,600
11 June 1986	12:00	Iraq	0–1	Mexico	Group B	103,763
15 June 1986	12:00	Mexico	2–0	Bulgaria	Round of 16	114,560
18 June 1986	12:00	England	3–0	Paraguay	Round of 16	98,728
22 June 1986	12:00	Argentina	2–1	England	Quarter-finals	114,580
25 June 1986	16:00	Argentina	2–0	Belgium	Semi-finals	114,500
29 June 1986	12:00	Argentina	3–2	West Germany	Final	114,600

==== List of 2026 FIFA World Cup matches ====
Date	Time (UTC−6)	Team #1	Res.	Team #2	Round	Attendance
11 June 2026	13:00	Mexico	2–0	South Africa	Group A	80,824
17 June 2026	20:00	Uzbekistan	1–3	Colombia	Group K	80,824
24 June 2026	19:00	Czech Republic	0–3	Mexico	Group A	80,824
30 June 2026	19:00	Mexico	2–0	Ecuador	Round of 32	80,824
5 July 2026	18:00	Mexico	2–3	England	Round of 16	80,824

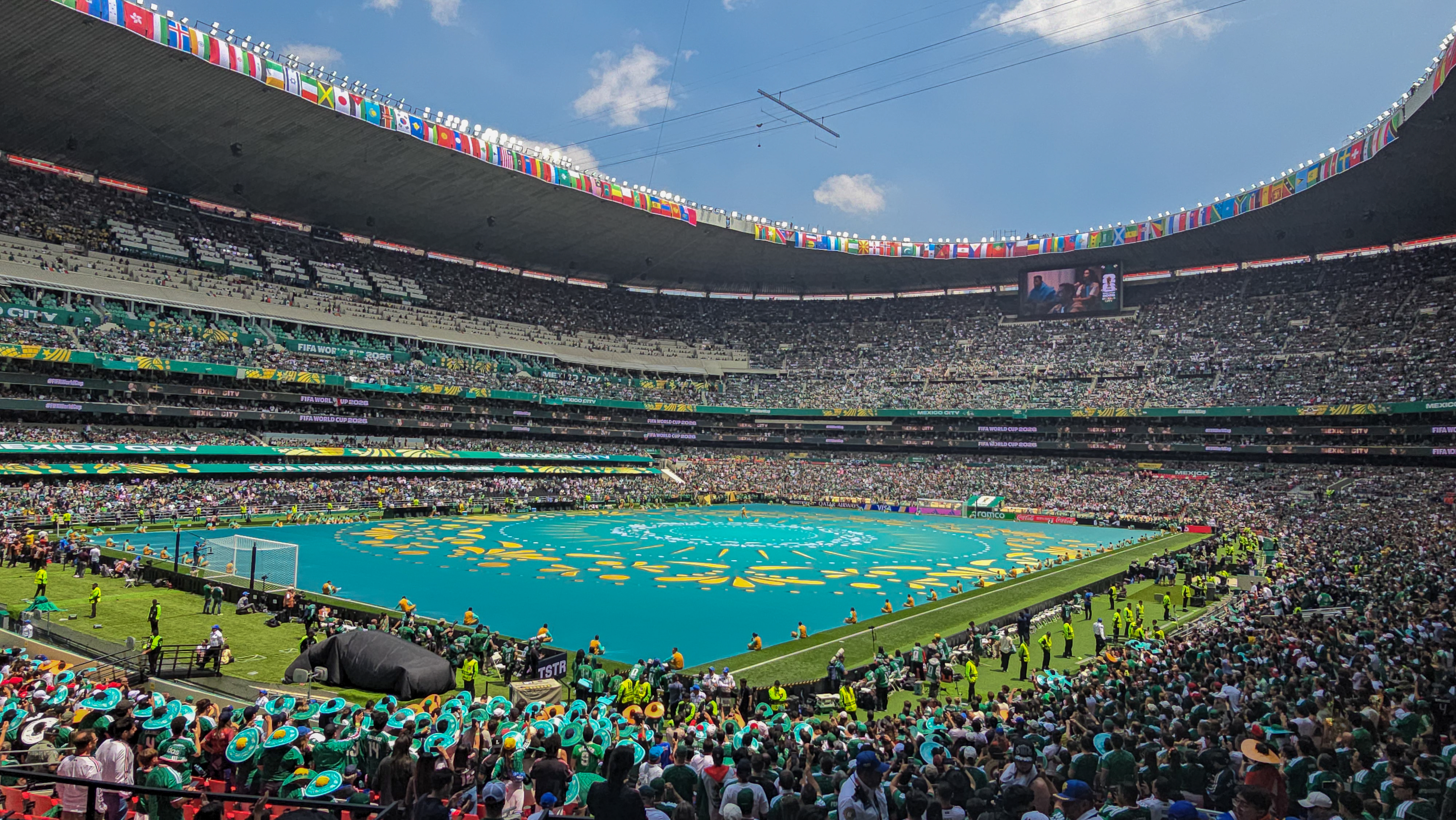
Inside Estadio Azteca during the opening ceremony prior to the opening match of the 2026 FIFA World Cup.

=== Other association football events ===
- 1968 Summer Olympics
- 1971 Women's World Cup
- 1975 Pan American Games
- 1977 CONCACAF Championship
- 1983 FIFA World Youth Championship
- 1985 Mexico City Cup / Azteca 2000
- 1993 CONCACAF Gold Cup
- 1999 FIFA Confederations Cup
- 2003 CONCACAF Gold Cup
- 2011 FIFA U-17 World Cup

=== American football ===
- On 15 August 1994, Estadio Azteca hosted a preseason American Bowl game between the Houston Oilers and Dallas Cowboys which still holds the record for the highest attendance at any NFL game, with 112,376 in attendance. The Houston Oilers won the game 6–0.
- On 2 October 2005, the first international regular-season game in the history of the NFL was played in the stadium between the San Francisco 49ers and the Arizona Cardinals. The game was a 31–14 victory for the Cardinals. It set the record of the largest crowd to attend a regular-season NFL game with 103,467, but this record would be broken in 2009.
- On 21 November 2016, the Oakland Raiders hosted a home game along with the Houston Texans as part of the NFL International Series in the first game dubbed NFL Mexico Game. It was the first Monday Night Football game played outside the United States. The game saw a sell-out crowd of 76,743 in a renovated Estadio Azteca.
- On 19 November 2017, the Raiders hosted the Patriots at the stadium.
- The Kansas City Chiefs were scheduled to play the Los Angeles Rams at the stadium on 19 November 2018. However, due to poor field conditions brought on by recent events, as well as rain, the NFL cancelled the event and moved it to the Rams' home stadium at the time, Los Angeles Memorial Coliseum. The Rams won the relocated game 54–51.
- The Kansas City Chiefs played the Los Angeles Chargers on 18 November 2019, with the Chargers designated as the "home" team.

Date	Away team	Result	Home team	Attendance
15 August 1994	Houston Oilers	6–0	Dallas Cowboys	112,376
17 August 1998	New England Patriots	21–3	Dallas Cowboys	-
19 August 2000	Indianapolis Colts	24–23	Pittsburgh Steelers	-
19 August 2001	Oakland Raiders	6–21	Dallas Cowboys	-
2 October 2005	San Francisco 49ers	14–31	Arizona Cardinals	103,467
21 November 2016	Houston Texans	20–27	Oakland Raiders	76,473
19 November 2017	New England Patriots	33–8	Oakland Raiders	77,357
19 November 2018	Kansas City Chiefs	—N/a	Los Angeles Rams	—N/a (Note: This game was scheduled to be played at Estadio Azteca, but poor field conditions forced the league to move the game to the Rams' home stadium, the Los Angeles Memorial Coliseum.)
18 November 2019	Kansas City Chiefs	24–17	Los Angeles Chargers	76,252
21 November 2022	San Francisco 49ers	38–10	Arizona Cardinals	78,427
22 November 2026	Minnesota Vikings	–	San Francisco 49ers	
2027	TBD	–	TBD	
2028	TBD	–	TBD	

=== Concerts ===
Date	Artist	Tour / concert name	Attendance	Ref.
12 March 1983	Menudo	—	100,000	—
13 November 1992	Elton John	-	300,000	-
29 and 31 October 1993; 7, 9 and 11 November 1993	Michael Jackson	Dangerous World Tour	550,000	
15 February 1997	Gloria Estefan	Evolution World Tour	—	
18 December 1997	Bronco	El Adios a Bronco	-	
16 June 2000	Los Temerarios	—	100,000	
3 March 2001	Maná and Jaguares	"ChiaPaz: Unidos Por La Paz"	104,000	
2 March 2002	Luis Miguel	Mis Romances Tour	—	
15 and 16 February 2006	U2	Vertigo Tour	141,278	
6 November 2008	Wisin & Yandel	Los Extraterrestres World Tour	16,000	
1 April 2009	Wisin & Yandel	Los Extraterrestres World Tour	16,000	
11, 14 and 15 May 2011	U2	360° Tour	282,978	
8 May 2012	Paul McCartney	On the Run	53,080	
16 April 2016	Vicente Fernández	Un Azteca en el Azteca, Adiós a Un Grande	100,000	
11 and 12 October 2018	Shakira	El Dorado World Tour	100,000	
3 December 2022	Los Bukis	Una Historia Cantada		
9 and 10 December 2022	Bad Bunny	World's Hottest Tour	115,000	
21 December 2023	RBD	Soy Rebelde Tour	90,000	
8, 9 and 10 February 2024	Karol G	Mañana Será Bonito Tour	140,795	
6 December 2025	Marilyn Manson, Falling in Reverse, Slaughter to Prevail, Shinedown, While She Sleeps, Hanabie, Fit For an Autopsy			
19 March 2027	Kanye West	Ye Live Concert Tour		

=== Christian events ===
- In 2015, Nigerian Pastor T.B. Joshua held a two-day Christian crusade, attracting an estimated 150,000 over both days.
- From 13 to 14 December 2013, assemblies were held by the Jehovah's Witnesses to commemorate their religious devotion with a series of performances in scenes of biblical passages, social-contemporary themes and Christian baptisms, of which each day record of participation of 105,000 faithful, of which on Sunday there was the record time of eviction of 10 minutes for reasons of other scheduled events and in turn 2000 participants were dedicated to cleaning after each event.

=== Funeral services ===
- A public funeral service for popular Mexican comedian Roberto Gomez "Chespirito" Bolaños was held at Azteca on 30 November 2014, and was attended by 40,000 spectators. Chespirito had been a long-time supporter of Club América.

== See also ==
- El Sol Rojo – Alexander Calder sculpture in Mexico City
- List of association football stadiums by capacity
- List of football stadiums in Mexico
- Lists of stadiums

== Notes ==
Events and tenants
Preceded by National Stadium; Tokyo	Summer Olympics; Men's football final 1968	Succeeded by Olympiastadion; Munich
Preceded by Wembley Stadium; London	FIFA World Cup; Opening venue 1970	Succeeded by Waldstadion; Frankfurt
Preceded by Wembley Stadium; London	FIFA World Cup; Final venue 1970	Succeeded by Olympiastadion; Munich
Preceded by Camp Nou; Barcelona	FIFA World Cup; Opening venue 1986	Succeeded by San Siro; Milan
Preceded by Estadio Santiago Bernabéu; Madrid	FIFA World Cup; Final venue 1986	Succeeded by Stadio Olimpico; Rome
Preceded by Los Angeles Memorial Coliseum; Los Angeles	CONCACAF Gold Cup; Final venue 1993	Succeeded by Los Angeles Memorial Coliseum; Los Angeles
Preceded by King Fahd II Stadium; Riyadh	FIFA Confederations Cup; Final venue 1999	Succeeded by International Stadium Yokohama; Yokohama
Preceded by Rose Bowl; Pasadena (Los Angeles)	CONCACAF Gold Cup; Final venue 2003	Succeeded by Giants Stadium; East Rutherford (New York)
Preceded by National Stadium; Abuja	FIFA U-17 World Cup; Final venue 2011	Succeeded by Mohammed bin Zayed Stadium; Abu Dhabi
Preceded by Al Bayt Stadium; Al Khor	FIFA World Cup; Opening venue 2026	Succeeded by TBD; TBD
