= Terminal Central de Autobuses del Sur =

Bus station in Mexico City

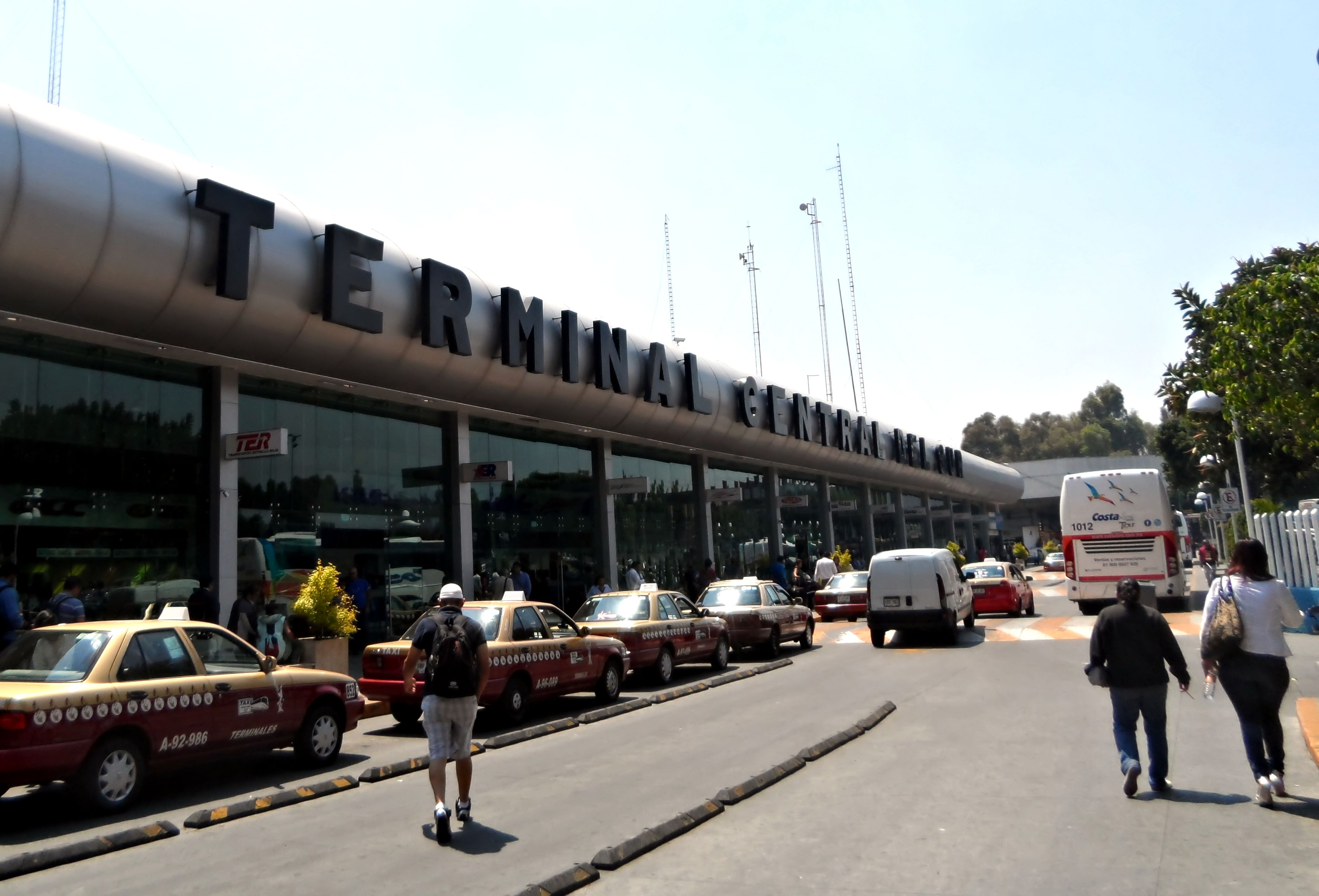
The station in 2014

Terminal Central de Autobuses del Sur is the southern intercity bus station in Mexico City.

== Connections ==
=== Public transport ===
The Tasqueña metro station and the Tasqueña light rail station are adjacent. Trolleybus line 1 also stops close by.

=== Road ===
The Calzada de Tlalpan passes close by.
