= Iztapasauria =

Dinosaur theme park in Iztapalapa, Mexico City

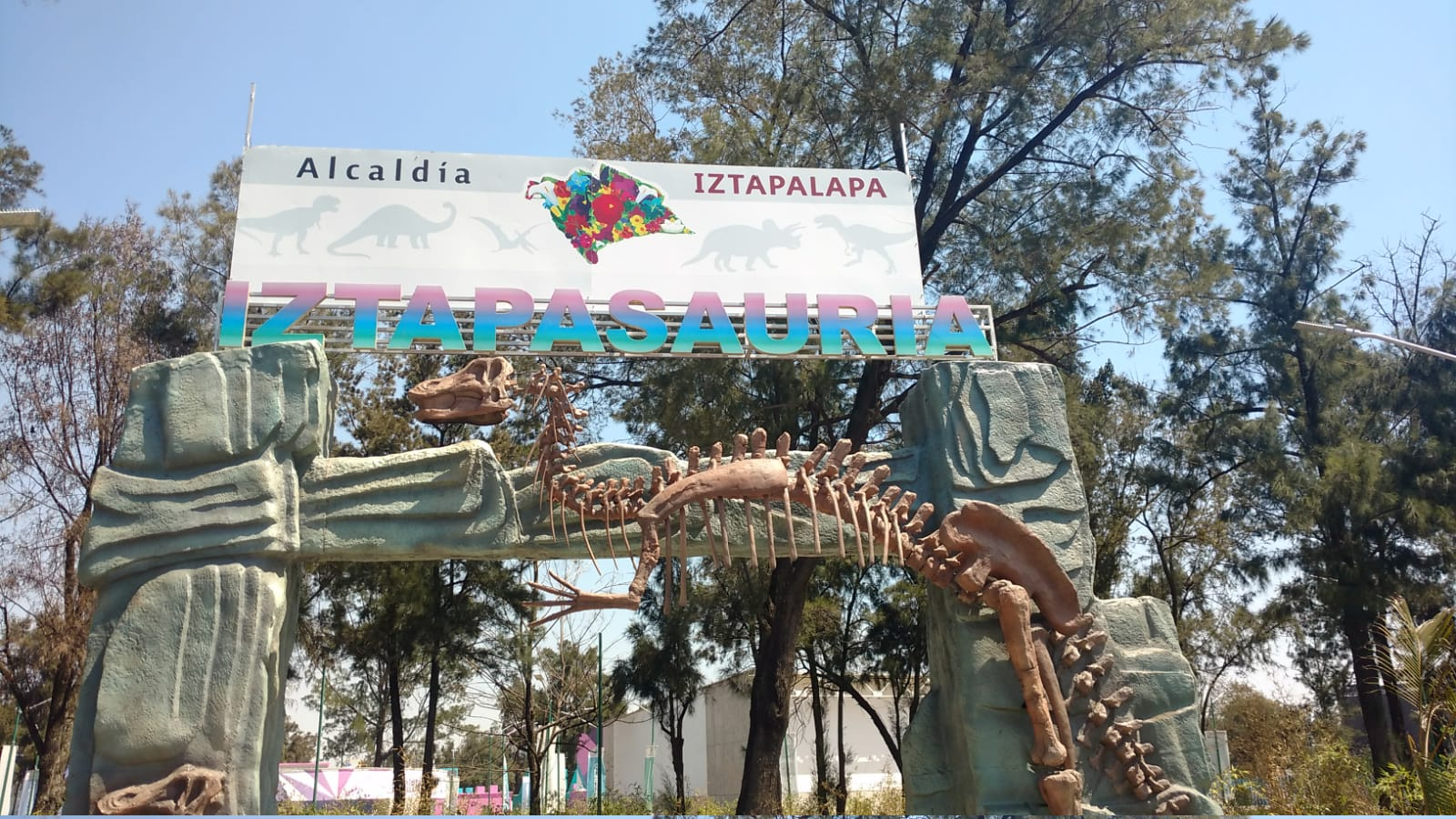
- Entrance, 2022
- Interactive map of Iztapasauria
- Coordinates: 19°20′39″N 99°02′53″W
- Status: Operating
- Opened: 4 December 2021
- Owner: Government of Iztapalapa
- Theme: Dinosaurs

Iztapasauria (also branded as IztapaSauria) is a free-entry dinosaur theme park in Iztapalapa, Mexico City. It opened on 4 December 2021 inside the Deportivo Utopía Santa Cruz Meyehualco sports complex. The theme park has several green areas decorated as a Mesozoic jungle in which there are thirteen animatronic dinosaurs.

== History and construction ==
An Ankylosaurus animatronic

Experts from UNAM's Institute of Geology contributed to the planning of the park. The complete rehabilitation of the sports center, which included the installation of the theme park, cost 100 million pesos. The rehabilitation and installation was requested by Clara Brugada, the head of the borough's office, and was inaugurated on 4 December 2021. Among the animatronics are species of Triceratops, Tyrannosaurus, Velociraptor, Omeisaurus, Irritator, Carnotaurus and Brontosaurus.

The Deportivo Santa Cruz Meyehualco sports complex was later renovated and transformed into Utopía Meyehualco, a cultural and recreational center of which Iztapasauria became a part. It has an area of 150,000 square meters (1,600,000 sq ft). The complex includes an Olympic-sized swimming pool, a gymnasium, sports courts, a music school, a coffee shop, an auditorium, a velodrome, athletics tracks, a women's spa, and a senior center.

Brugada announced in 2025 a spin-off amusement park, planned to be placed in the borough of Coyoacán, and projected to be named Coyosauria. It would also include dinosaur figures, and it is planned to be built in an area measuring almost 5,000 square meters (54,000 sq ft) in the neighborhood of Santa Úrsula Coapa.
