= Tasqueña light rail station =

Northern terminal of the Xochimilco Light Rail

Tasqueña
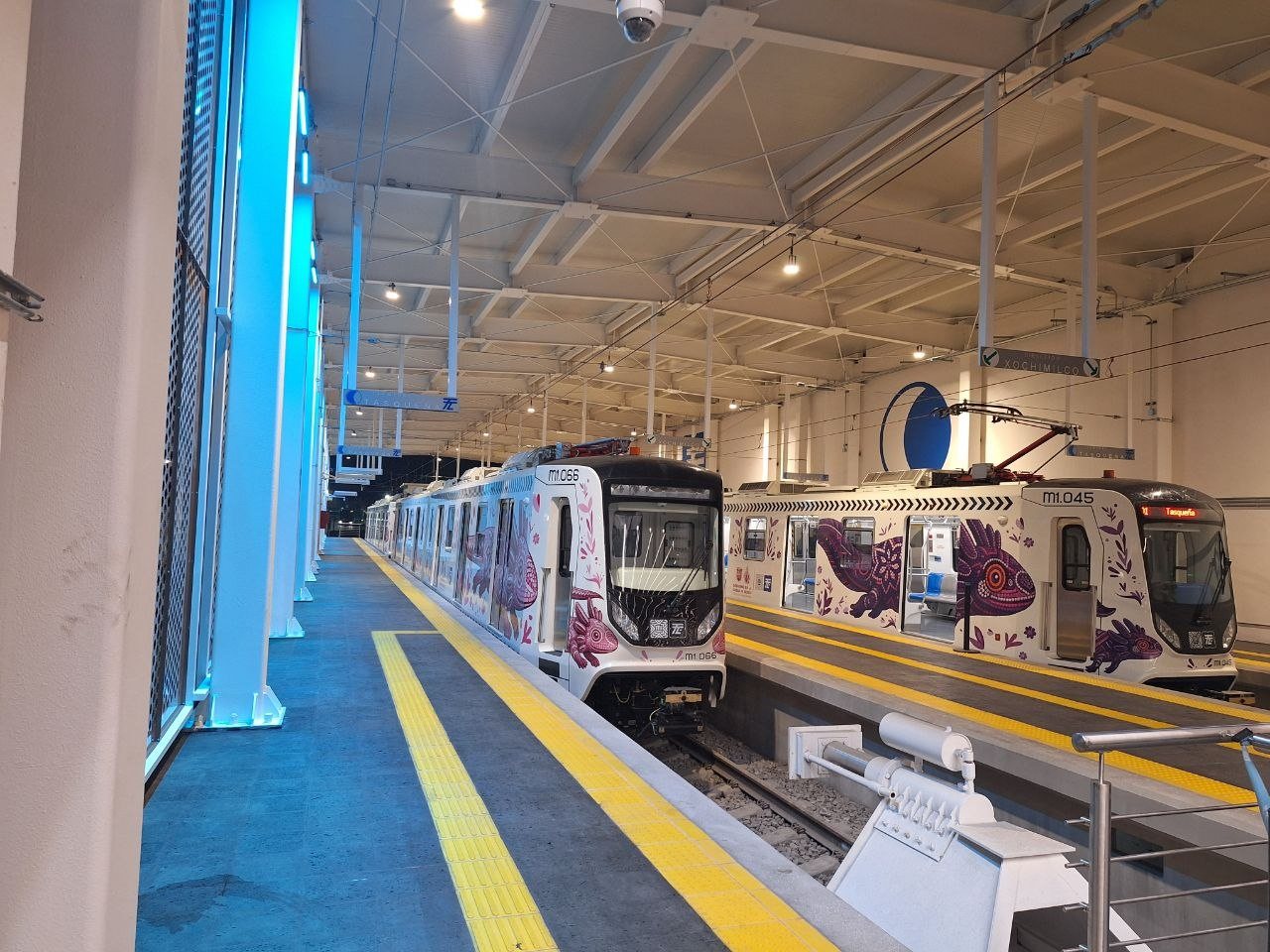
- Station platforms, 2026

General information
- Location: Calzada de Tlalpan, Calzada Taxqueña and Canal de Miramontes; Coyoacán, Mexico City; Mexico
- Coordinates: 19°20′37″N 99°08′26″W
- System: Mexico City Light Rail
- Owner: Government of Mexico City
- Operator: Servicio de Transportes Eléctricos (STE)
- Platforms: 2 side platforms; 1 island platform
- Tracks: 2
- Connections: Tasqueña; Tasqueña; South Bus Terminal; Routes: 2-A, 17-F, 31-B, 81-A, 111-A, 143, 145-A; Lines 1, 7 and 12; Routes: 2-A, 2-F, 5-A, 17-C, 17-H, 17-I

Construction
- Structure type: At grade
- Accessible: Yes

Other information
- Status: In service

History
- Opened: 1 August 1986; 40 years ago
- Rebuilt: 2025–2026

Key dates
- 1 July 2019; 7 years ago: Temporarily closed
- 16 January 2020; 6 years ago: Reopened
- 28 July 2025; 15 months ago: Temporarily closed
- 11 May 2026; 5 months ago: Reopened

Services
Preceding station	STE	Following station
Terminus	Mexico City Light Rail	Las Torres toward Xochimilco
Route map
Location
- Location within Mexico City
- Area map

Tasqueña light rail station, (Note: Estación Tasqueña del Tren Ligero. Spanish pronunciation: [tasˈke.ɲa]. The name of the station is the denomyn for a woman from Taxco, Guerrero.) alternatively spelled Taxqueña, is a station of the Mexico City Light Rail in the colonia (neighborhood) of Campestre Churubusco, in the borough of Coyoacán, Mexico City. It is an at-grade station with two side platforms and one island platform, featuring the Spanish solution layout. It serves as the northern terminus of the only light train service in the city. It is followed by Las Torres station.

The station is situated adjacent to the Mexico City Metro station of the same name, which is the southern terminus of Line 2. The name of both stations reference the nearby Calzada Taxqueña, a major avenue in the area. The station's pictogram depicts a crescent moon. Due to its connection with the metro station, the light rail station facilities are accessible to people with disabilities featuring elevators, tactile paving, braille plates, and wheelchair ramps. Outside, the station has a transportation hub servicing local bus routes, the trolleybus system, and the southern intercity bus station. Additionally, there is a bicycle parking station, an Internet café, a women's assistance module, a health center, and a mural.

Tasqueña opened on 1 August 1986, providing southward service toward Estadio Azteca station. It has undergone several renovations, the most recent between 2025 and 2026, to expand its platforms from two side platforms to a Spanish solution layout, adding a new central platform in anticipation of increased tourist demand for the 2026 FIFA World Cup, as the line connects to Estadio Azteca.

== Location ==
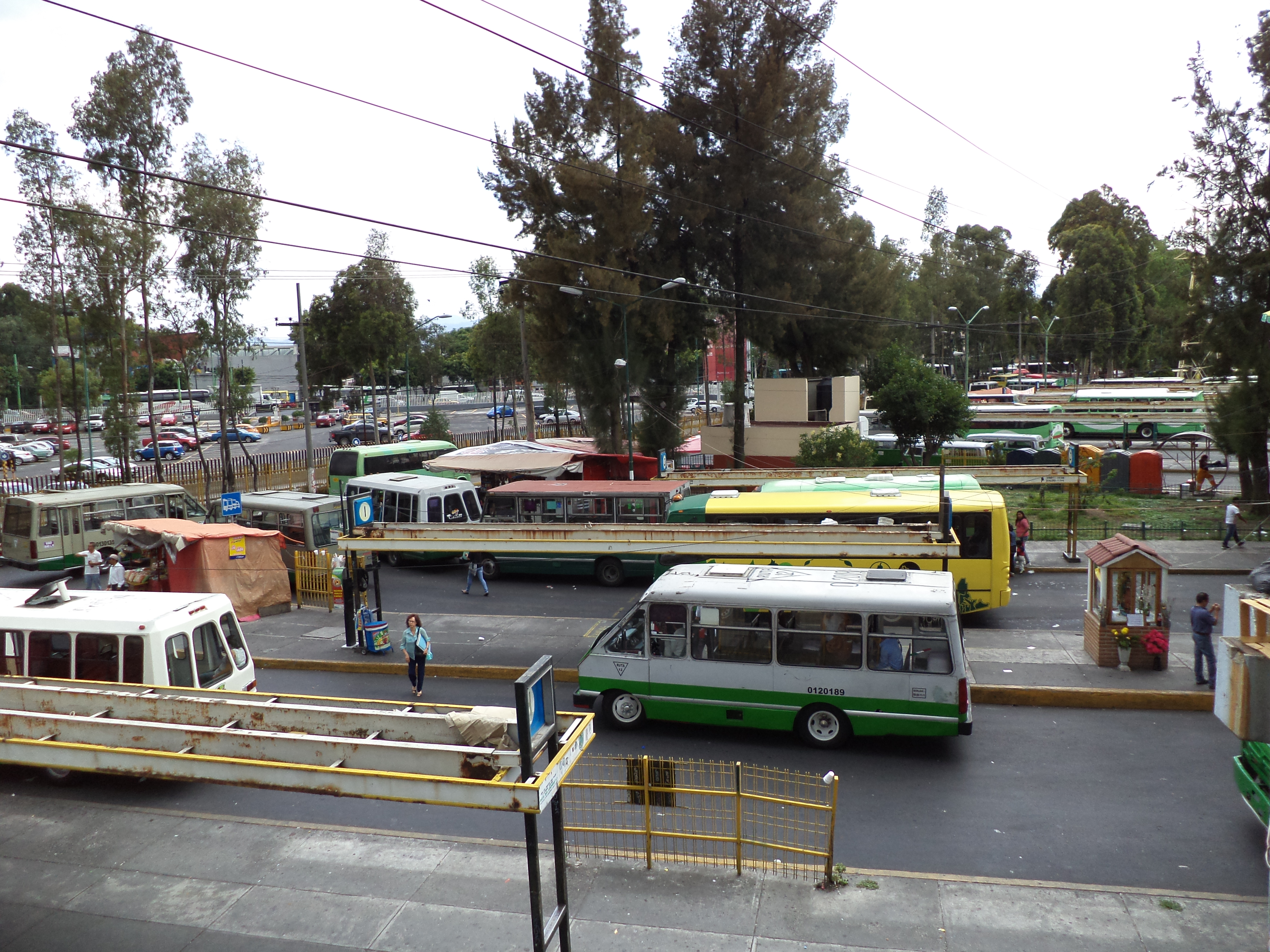
View of the Tasqueña transportation hub in 2013

Tasqueña is an at-grade light rail station situated next to the terminus station of the same name of the Mexico City Metro along Line 2 (the Blue Line). It is located within the CETRAM Tasqueña transportation hub, between Calzada de Tlalpan, Calzada Taxqueña and Canal de Miramontes avenues, in the Campestre Churubusco neighborhood of Coyoacán, south-central Mexico City.

Outside the railway stations is the CETRAM Tasqueña transportation hub, which conects to multiple local bus routes, bus routes operated by the Red de Transporte de Pasajeros (RTP), the trolleybus system, and the southern intercity bus station. The hub is operated under the Centro de transferencia modal (CETRAM) system.

== History and layout ==
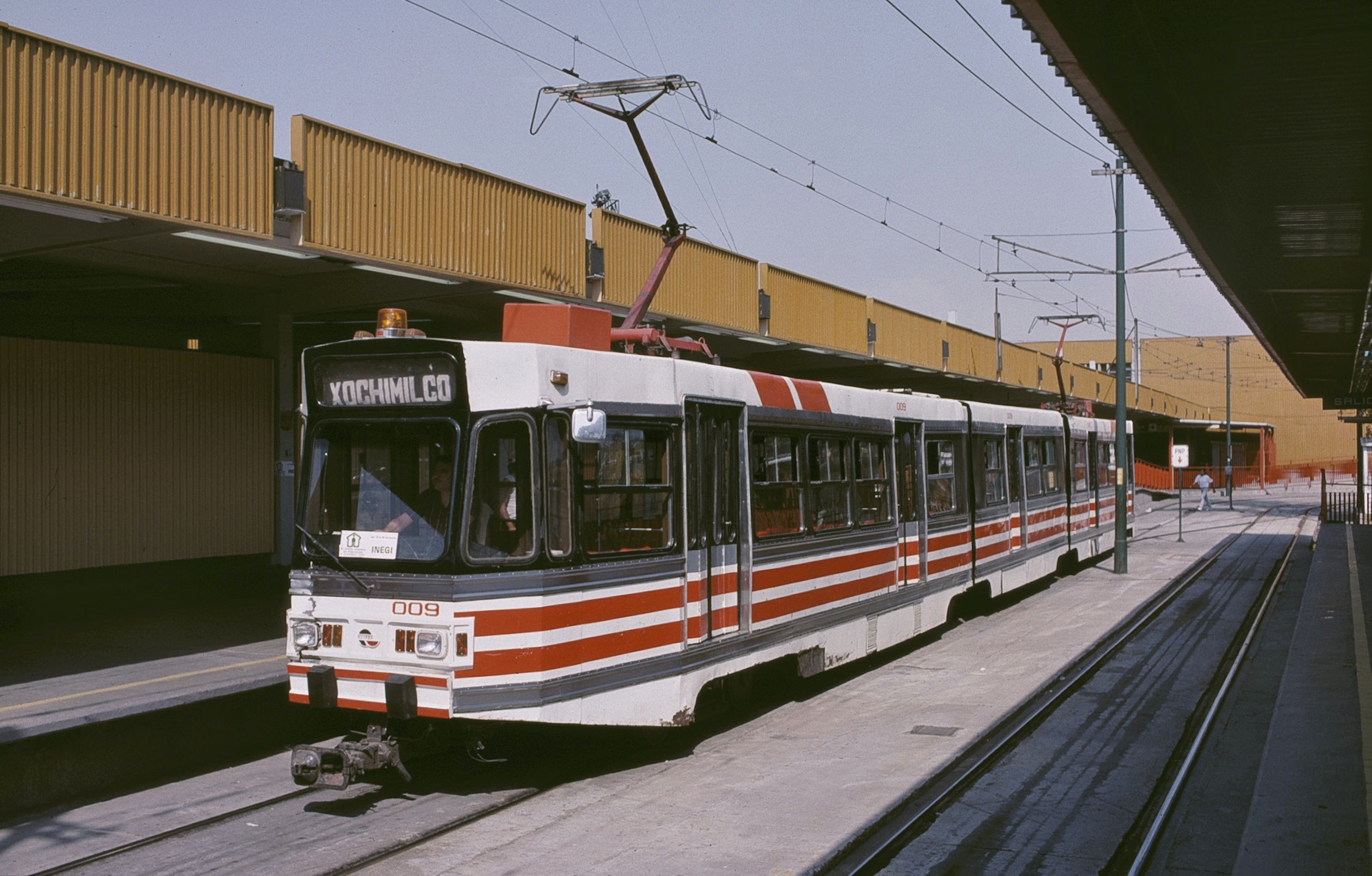
A Moyada-built light rail car at Tasqueña in 1990

Tasqueña light rail station opened on 1 August 1986, operating toward Estadio Azteca station. Within the system, Tasqueña is followed by Las Torres.

Since it is connected to Tasqueña metro station, the station indirectly has two exits that connect to Calzada Canal de Miramontes. The northern exit is in the corner of Calle Cerro de Jesús, while the southern one leads to the CETRAM between Avenida Taxqueña and Calzada de Tlalpan. The metro station offers a disabled-accessible service with elevators, wheelchair ramps, tactile paving, and braille signage plates. Other facilities in the metro station building include a bicycle parking station, an Internet café, a women's assistance module, a health center, and a mural titled Elementos by Alberto Castro Leñero.

The name of the metro station comes from Calzada Taxqueña. In turn, the road was named after a woman from Taxco, Guerrero, who owned the land and was known by the denomyn Taxqueña. The station's pictogram depicts the silhouette of a crescent moon, referencing the area's former local name, La Luna ("The Moon"), which came from a bakery once located in the area. According to the metro system, the name distinction between Tasqueña and Taxqueña helps differentiate the station from the avenue.

Service at Tasqueña light rail station was suspended between 1 July 2019 and 16 January 2020 due to a system refurbishment. Tracks that had been in use since the 1890s, which were once used by the former streetcars before the conversion to light rail, were replaced due to lack of adhesion and misalignments.

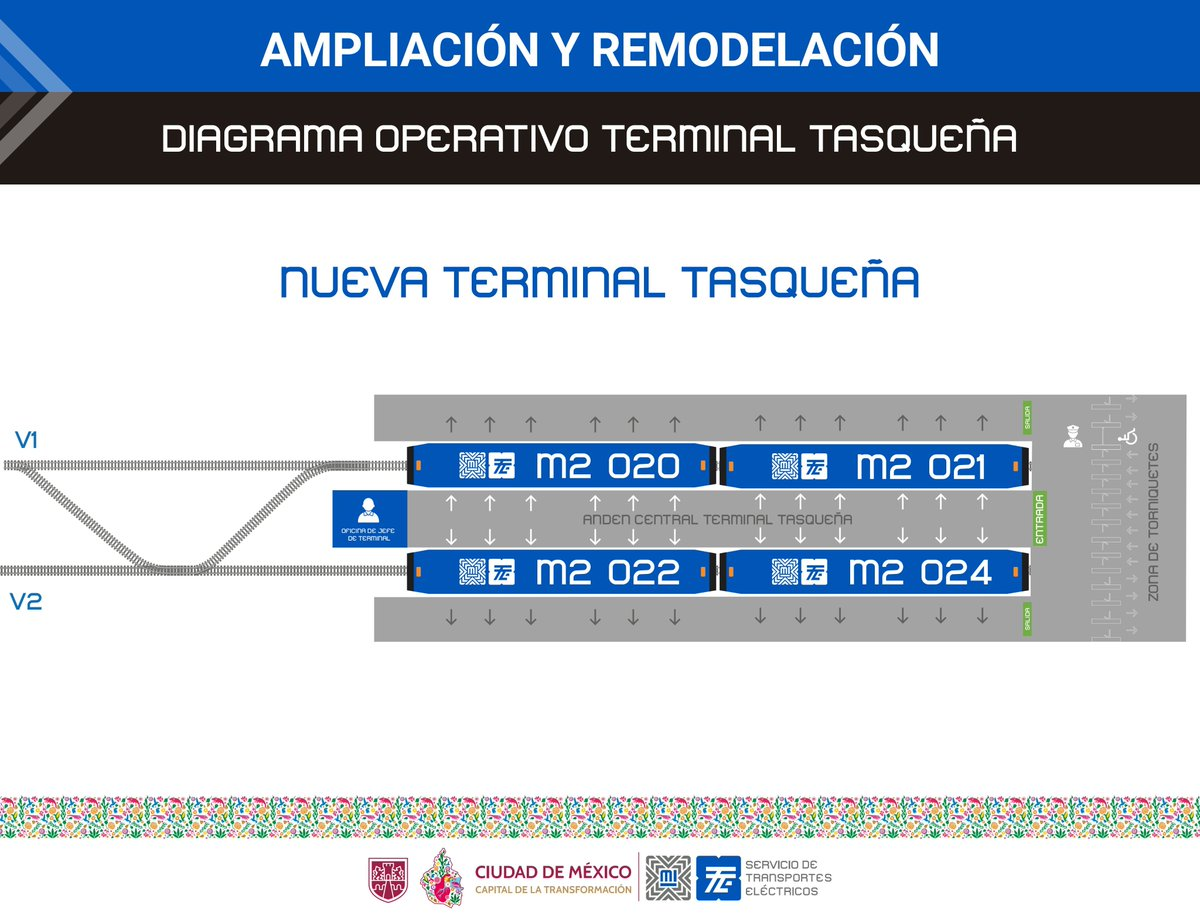
The station has a Barcelona design, featuring two side platforms and one island platform

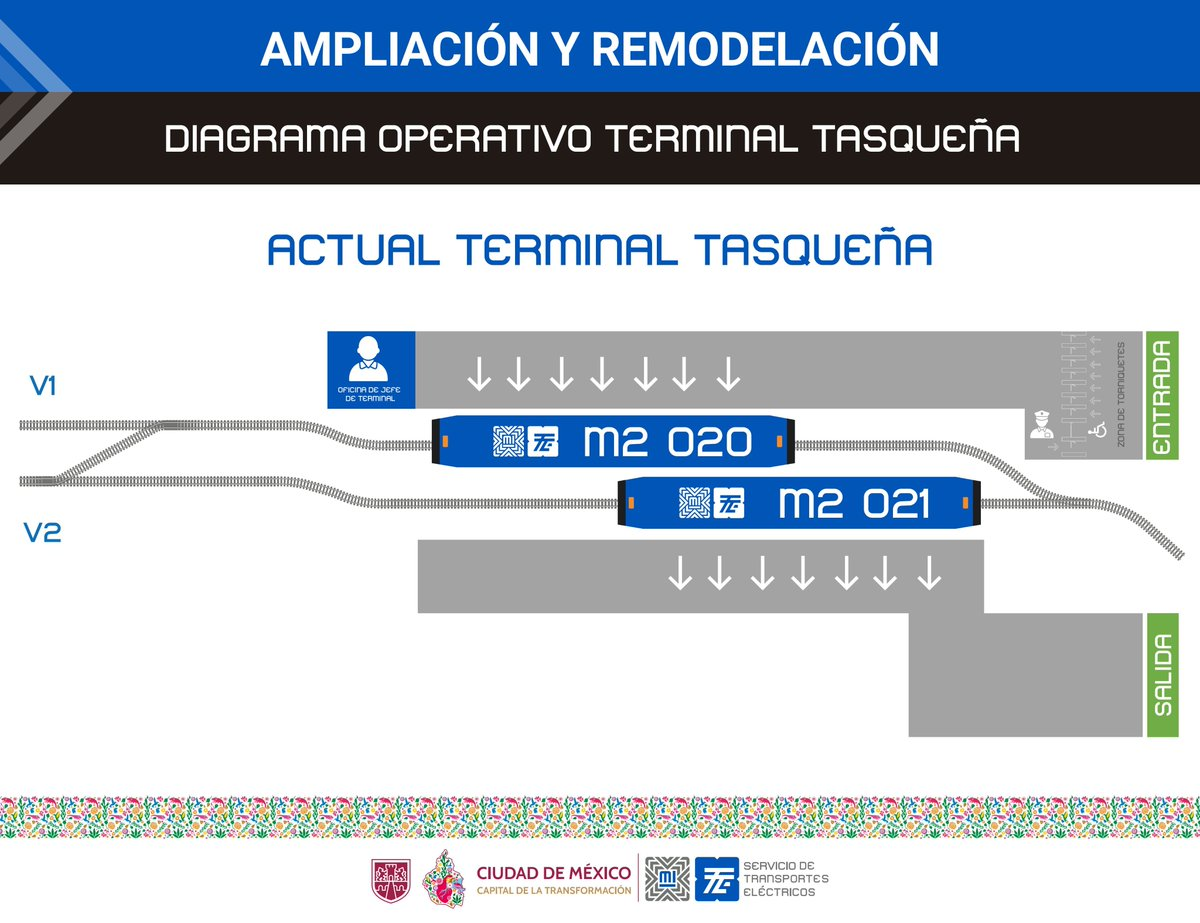
The station had side platforms

From 1986 to 2025, the side platforms were relatively small, and expansion plans were proposed for many years. In 2003, the French engineering firm SYSTRA was commissioned to develop a renovation and upgrade project for the metro lines 1, 2 and 3, which indirectly would have affected the light rail station if it had been carried out.

On 28 July 2025, in preparation for increased demand due to the 2026 FIFA World Cup, renovation works began at the station to add an additional platform to the light rail station. The Barcelona solution was chosen to allow passengers to disembark onto the side platforms while boarding occurs on the central island platform. The light rail line connects to the Estadio Azteca light rail station, which serves the stadium of the same name.

The station temporarily reopened still under construction on 28 March 2026, in time for the friendly match between Mexico and Portugal. It was closed the next day. It was officially reopened on 11 May.

=== Incidents ===
On 22 May 2001, at approximately 9:30 p.m. (UTC−6), two trains collided less than 1 kilometer (0.62 mi) from the terminal while repair work on the line had reduced traffic to a single track. The trains were nearly empty, one passenger died of a heart attack, and 39 others resulted injured. Authorities attributed the accident to a lack of communicative coordination.

== Gallery ==
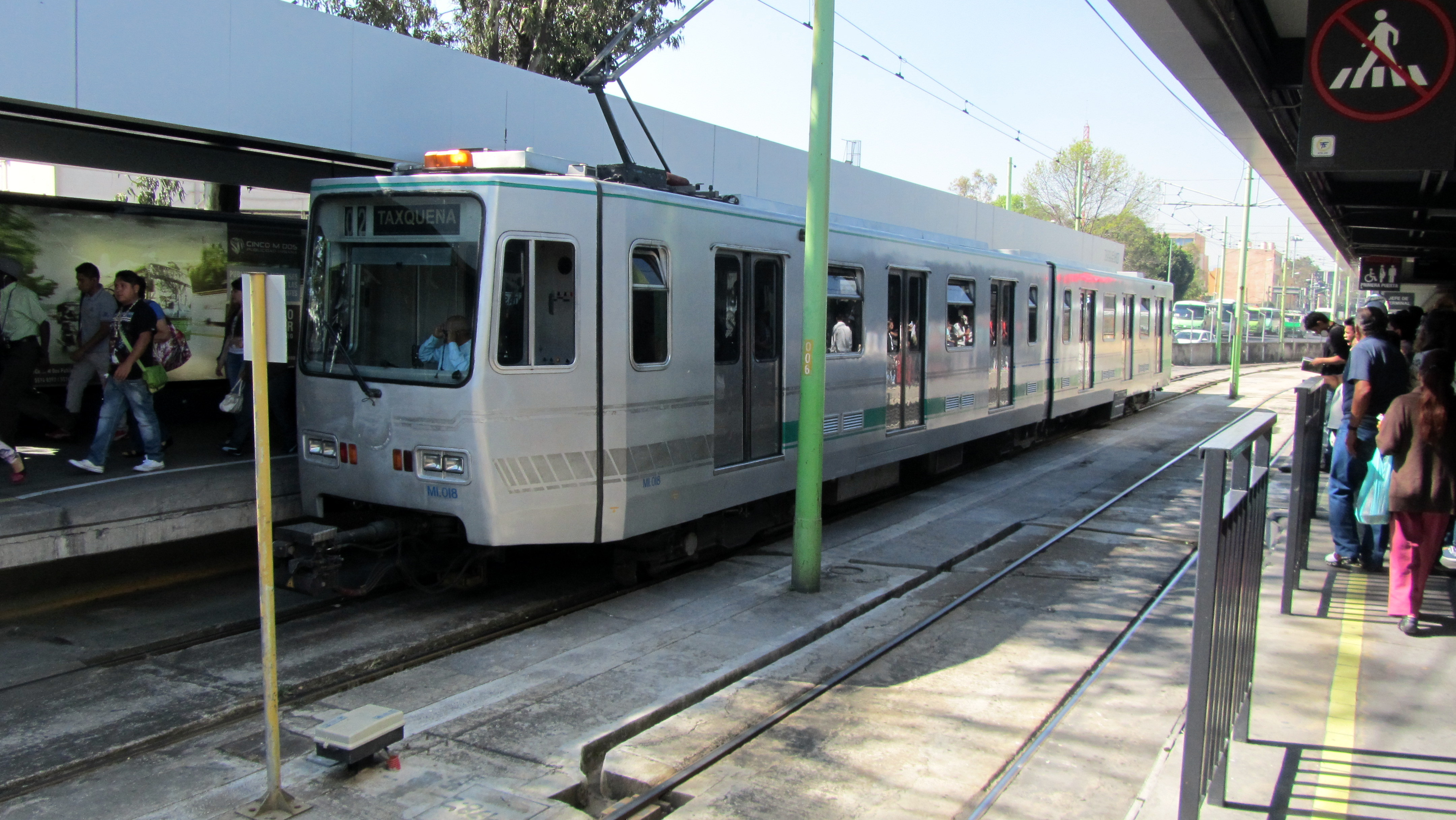
A TE-12 Concarril train disembarking at Tasqueña in 2014

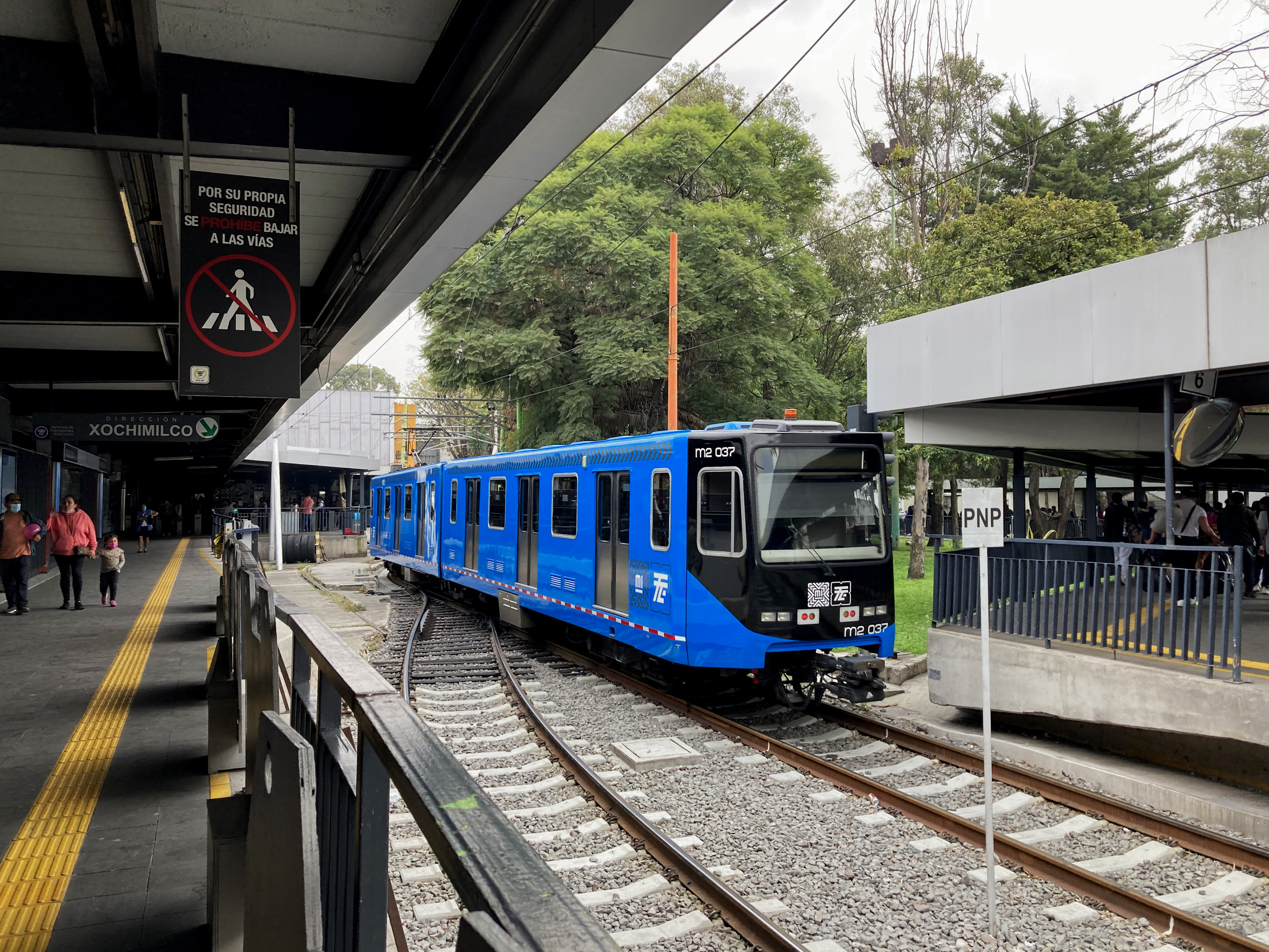
A TE-23 CRRC Zhuzhou Locomotive train at the station

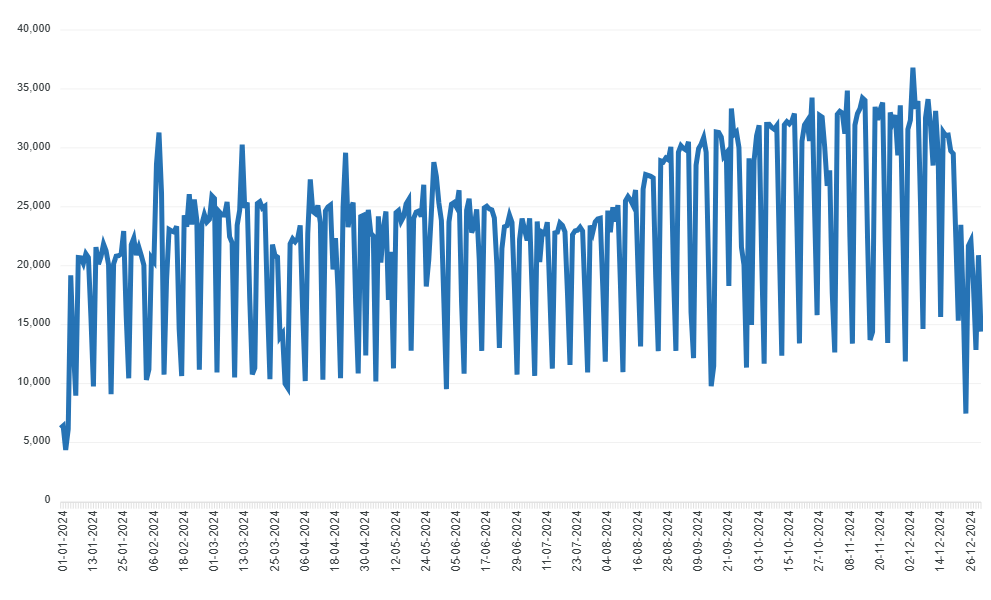
In 2024, station entry ridership ranged from 4,300 to 37,000 passengers.
