= Santa Úrsula, Mexico City =

Neighborhood in Mexico City

Coordinates: 19.3098°N 99.1435°W

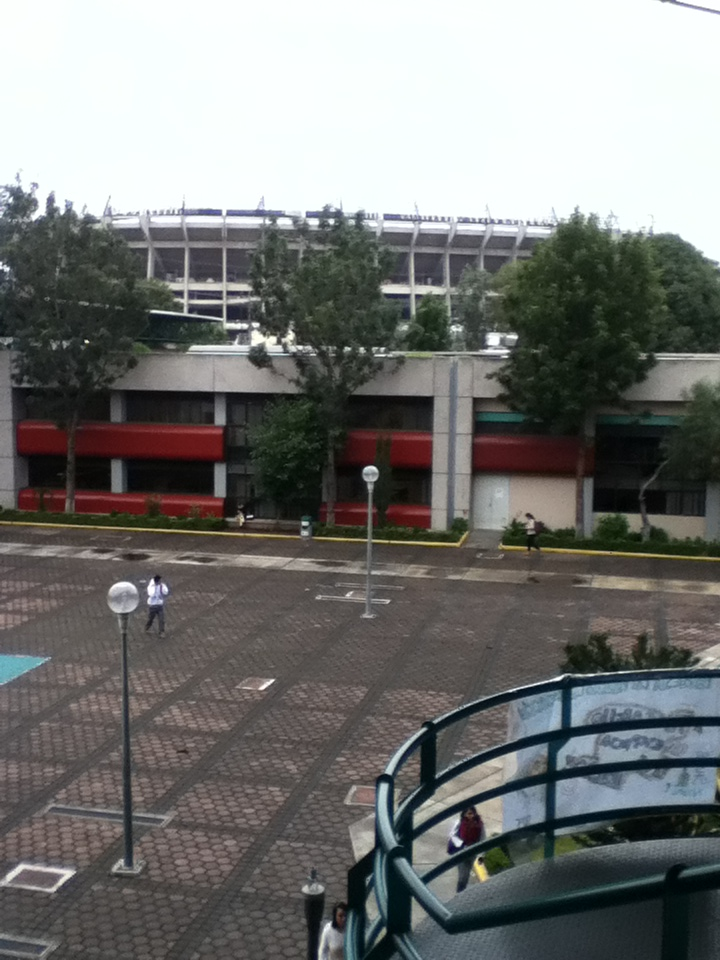
High school "Escuela Preparatoria Coyoacán Ricardo Flores Magón" in Santa Úrsula

Santa Úrsula Coapa is a neighborhood in Coyoacan, a borough in Mexico City. It is home to the Estadio Azteca, the home ground of football club Club América.
