= Tasqueña metro station =

Mexico City metro station

Tasqueña
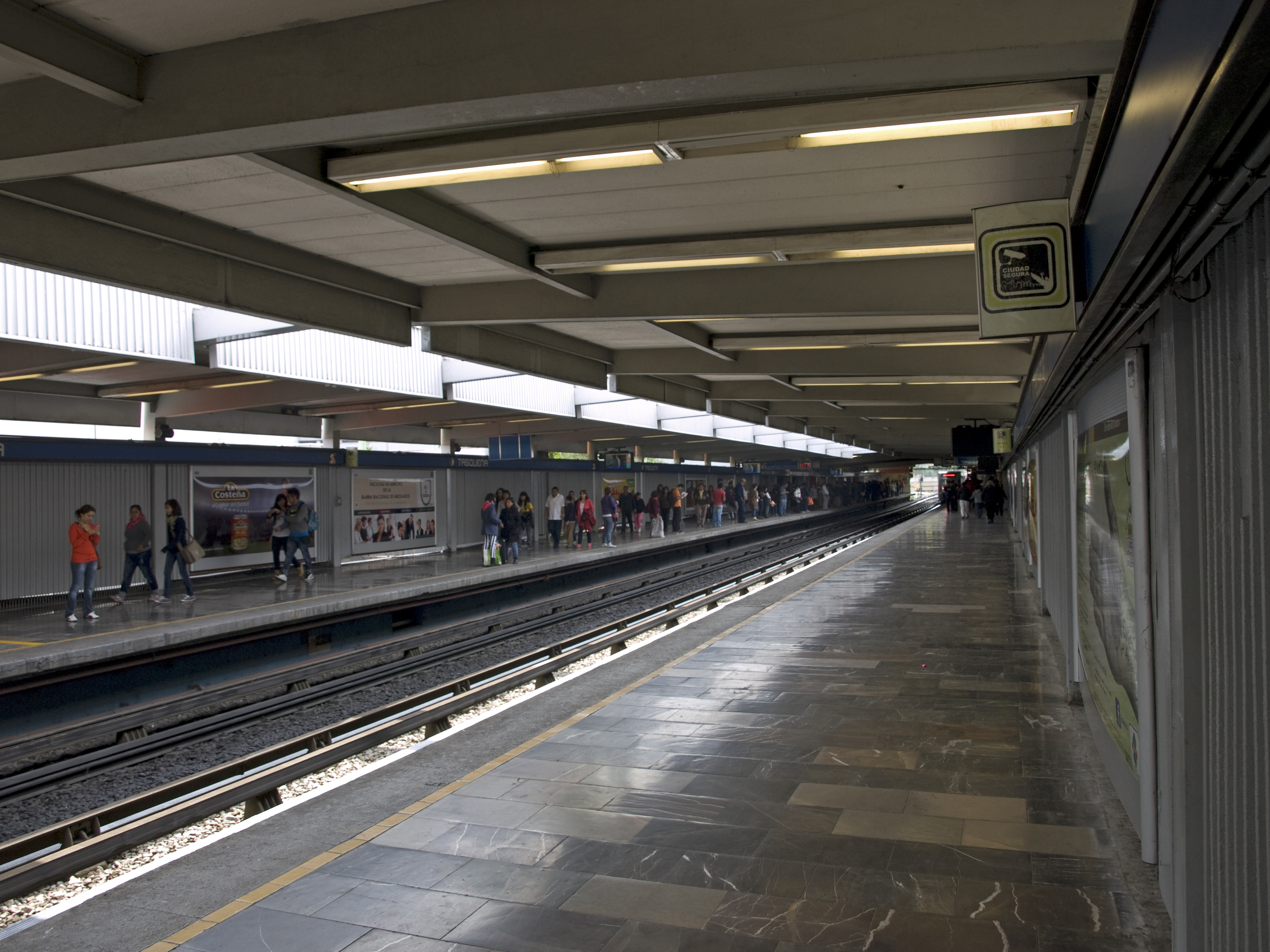
- Station platforms, 2014

General information
- Location: Calzada de Tlalpan, Calzada Taxqueña and Canal de Miramontes; Coyoacán, Mexico City; Mexico
- Coordinates: 19°20′39″N 99°08′34″W
- System: Mexico City Metro
- Owner: Government of Mexico City
- Operator: Sistema de Transporte Colectivo (STC)
- Platforms: 2 side platforms
- Tracks: 2
- Connections: Tasqueña; Tasqueña; South Bus Terminal; Routes: 2-A, 17-F, 31-B, 81-A, 111-A, 143, 145-A; Lines 1, 7 and 12; Routes: 2-A, 2-F, 5-A, 17-C, 17-H, 17-I

Construction
- Structure type: At grade
- Accessible: Yes

Other information
- Status: In service

History
- Opened: 1 August 1970; 56 years ago

Passengers
- 2025: 19,382,368 (Note: The system's website counts only passenger entries into stations and does not include passengers passing through, transferring between lines, or exiting the station. The data here is limited to the most recent ten years to avoid excessive listings; earlier figures can be found in this page's history or on the Mexico City Metro website. To calculate the average daily ridership, the annual total is divided by 365 days (366 in leap years), with decimals omitted from the result. Each station per line is ranked individually, as the system counts transfer stations separately. The percentage change is calculated automatically using the data from the current year and the previous year.) ▲6.24%
- Rank: 5/195

Services
Preceding station	Mexico City Metro	Following station
General Anaya toward Cuatro Caminos	Line 2	Terminus
Route map
Location
- Location within Mexico City
- Area map

Tasqueña metro station, (Note: Estación del Metro Tasqueña. Spanish pronunciation: [tasˈke.ɲa]. The name of the station is the denomyn for a woman from Taxco, Guerrero.) alternatively spelled Taxqueña, is a station on the Mexico City Metro in the city's borough of Coyoacán. It is an at-grade railway stop with two side platforms serving Line 2 (Blue Line). It serves as the southern terminus of the line, and is followed by General Anaya station.

Tasqueña was opened on 1 August 1970, providing service north toward Pino Suárez. The station is situated adjacent to Tasqueña light rail station, which serves as the northern terminus of the Mexico City Light Rail. The station's name reference the nearby Calzada Taxqueña, a major avenue in the area. The station's pictogram depicts a crescent moon. Tasqueña metro station's facilities are accessible to people with disabilities featuring elevators, tactile paving, braille plates, and wheelchair ramps. Outside, it has a transportation hub servicing local bus routes, the trolleybus system, and the southern intercity bus station.

Other services and features include a bicycle parking station, an Internet café, a women's assistance module, a health center, and a mural. The station services the colonia (neighborhood) of Campestre Churubusco. In 2025, Tasqueña metro station had an average daily ridership of 53,102 passenger entries, ranking it the fifth busiest stop in the network.

== Location and layout ==
Tasqueña is an at-grade metro station on Line 2 located next to the terminus station, Tasqueña light rail station, of the Mexico City Light Rail system. It is located within the CETRAM Tasqueña transportation hub, between Calzada de Tlalpan, Calzada Taxqueña and Canal de Miramontes avenues, in the Campestre Churubusco neighborhood of Coyoacán, south-central Mexico City.

Within the system, General Anaya is the next stop. The railyard and the line's workshop, also known as Tasqueña, are located adjacent to the station. The station's facilities are accessible to people with disabilities featuring elevators, tactile paving, braille plates, and wheelchair ramps.

Outside the railway stations is the CETRAM Tasqueña transportation hub, which conects to multiple local bus routes, bus routes operated by the Red de Transporte de Pasajeros (RTP), the trolleybus system, and the southern intercity bus station. The hub is operated under the Centro de transferencia modal (CETRAM) system.

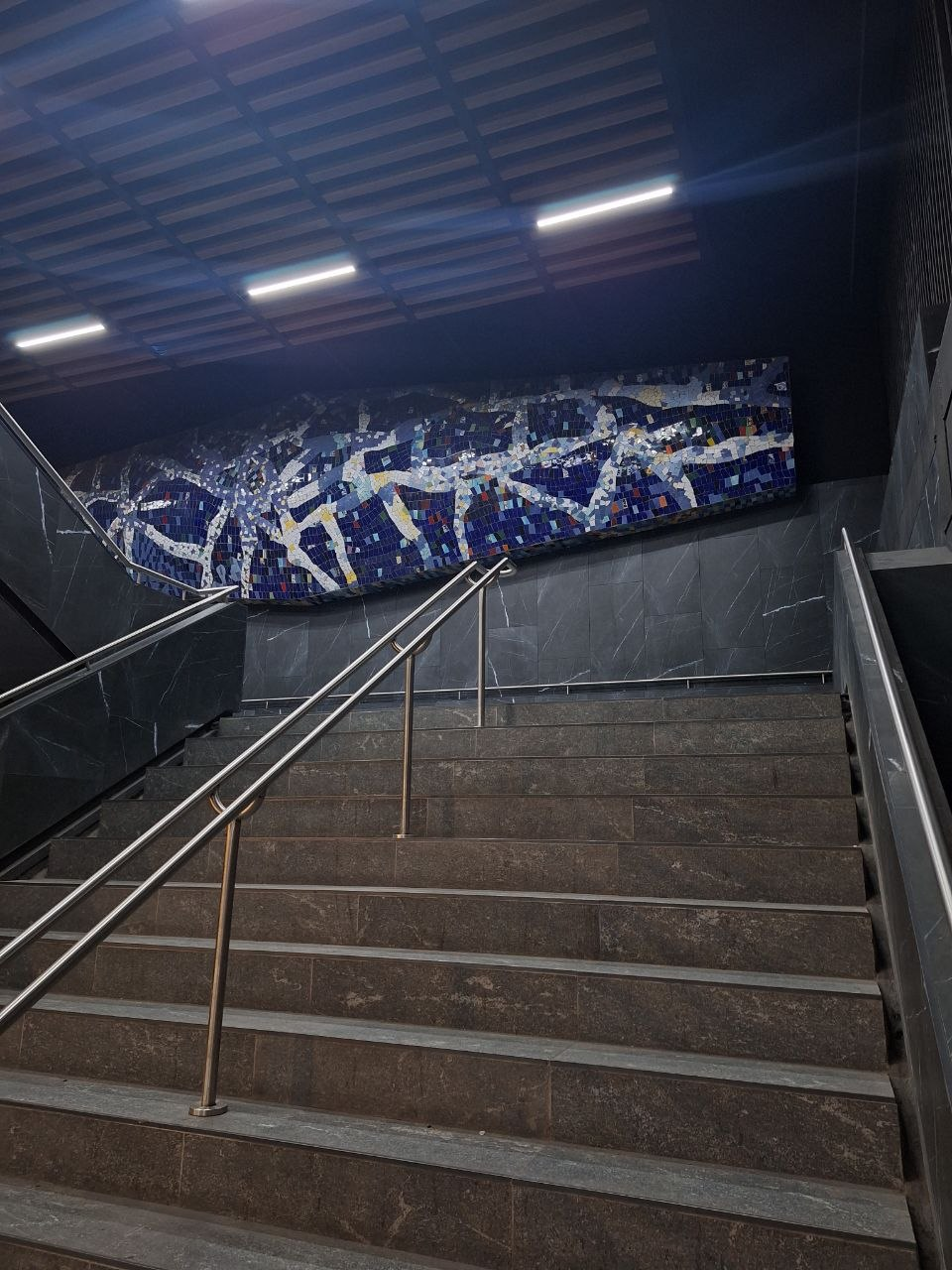
Azul, by Castro Leñero

Inside Tasqueña metro station, there are several murals by Alberto Castro Leñero, created with Talavera-style tiles and ceramics. Collectively named Elementos, Castro Leñero made Aliento, Fuego, Horizone, and Azul, which all have hexagonal shapes, and were installed in November 2006. He said the goal was to cover the station's four walls to "envelop" commuters and "convey something", adding that even if they do not take the time to appreciate the artworks, "something remains with them". According to La Jornada journalist Daniel López Aguilar, "each piece represents an element and allows viewers to generate personal meanings through color, shape, and volume".

Other facilities in the metro station building include a bicycle parking station, an Internet café, a women's assistance module, and a health center.

== History and construction ==
Line 2 of the Mexico City Metro was built by Ingeniería de Sistemas de Transportes Metropolitano, Electrometro and Cometro, the latter being a subsidiary of Empresas ICA. Its first section was inaugurated on 1 August 1970, running from Tasqueña to Pino Suárez. The section between Tasqueña and General Anaya is 1,330 meters (4,360 ft) long.

In the early 2000s, the Sistema de Transporte Collectivo (STC), the public agency that operates the Mexico City Metro, commissioned the consulting firm Systra to develop a renovation plan for Line 2, including the possibility of constructing an additional platform to increase passenger capacity.

In preparation for increased demand caused by the 2026 FIFA World Cup, Tasqueña metro station underwent renovations between 2025 and 2026. The station's turnstiles were replaced with speed gates. Castro Leñero visited his murals in March 2026, saying that they have not required any maintenance thanks to the materials used, and stating that simply dusting them is sufficient to preserve them. Instead, he recommended improving the surrounding elements, which could otherwise obstruct a clear view of the murals.

=== Name and pictogram ===
The stop is named after Calzada Taxqueña, which in turn was named after the area, as it was reportedly owned by a woman from Taxco, Guerrero, and taxqueña is the demonym for a woman from the city. The etymology of Taxco derives from the Nahuatl word tlachco, meaning "place where ball games are played". It is unclear why the Mexico City Metro adopted a spelling with an "s" instead of an "x".

Before the metro station was built, transportation routes used both spellings interchangeably. According to Rafael Alberto Flores, tasqueño or tasqueña do not derive directly from Nahuatl because the letter "ñ" was borrowed from Spanish. He mentioned that tlachco was Hispanicized and the pronunciation changed from [tat͡ʃˈkeɲo] to [tasˈkeɲo] because of phonetical simplicity.

The station's pictogram features the silhouette of a crescent moon, which, according to the Mexico City Metro website, references a former local bakery named La Luna. Other explanations have been proposed for why the station features a moon in its pictogram. In pre-Columbian times, moon was venerated by the Culhuacán people, who settled near present-day Calzada Taxqueña. Another possibility is a historical association between the moon and silver, as Taxco is known for its silver mining activities.

=== Incidents ===
On 24 August 2026, a metallic object fell to the tracks, causing a short circuit and igniting the tires of a train. No injuries were reported.

== Ridership ==
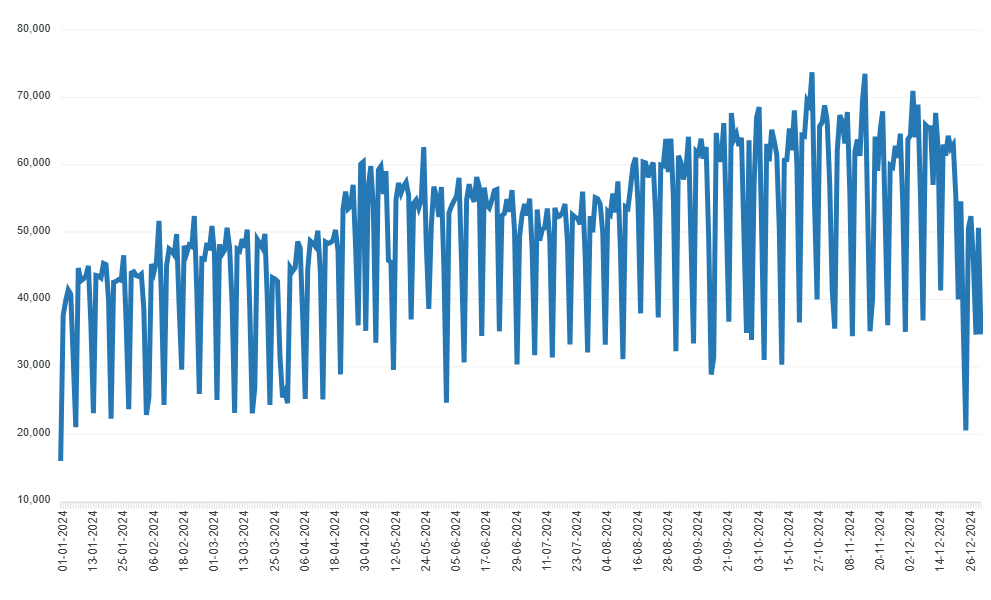
Daily ridership for Tasqueña station in 2024

According to official data, before the impact of the COVID-19 pandemic, Tasqueña metro station recorded between 73,000 and 80,000 average daily entries from 2016 to 2019. In 2025, it recorded 19,382,368 passenger entries, ranking fifth among the system's 195 stations.

Annual passenger ridership
Year	Ridership	Average daily	Rank	% change	Ref.
2025	19,382,368	53,102	5/195	+6.24%	
2024	18,243,171	49,844	7/195	−1.68%	
2023	18,555,590	50,837	4/195	−13.94%	
2022	21,560,705	59,070	6/195	+48.84%	
2021	14,486,239	39,688	7/195	+5.12%	
2020	13,781,230	37,653	7/195	−48.78%	
2019	26,905,368	73,713	7/195	−7.78%	
2018	29,175,678	79,933	7/195	+7.76%	
2017	27,075,614	74,179	7/195	−3.11%	
2016	27,943,776	76,349	7/195	−14.78%	
