= Calzada de Tlalpan =

Avenue in Mexico City

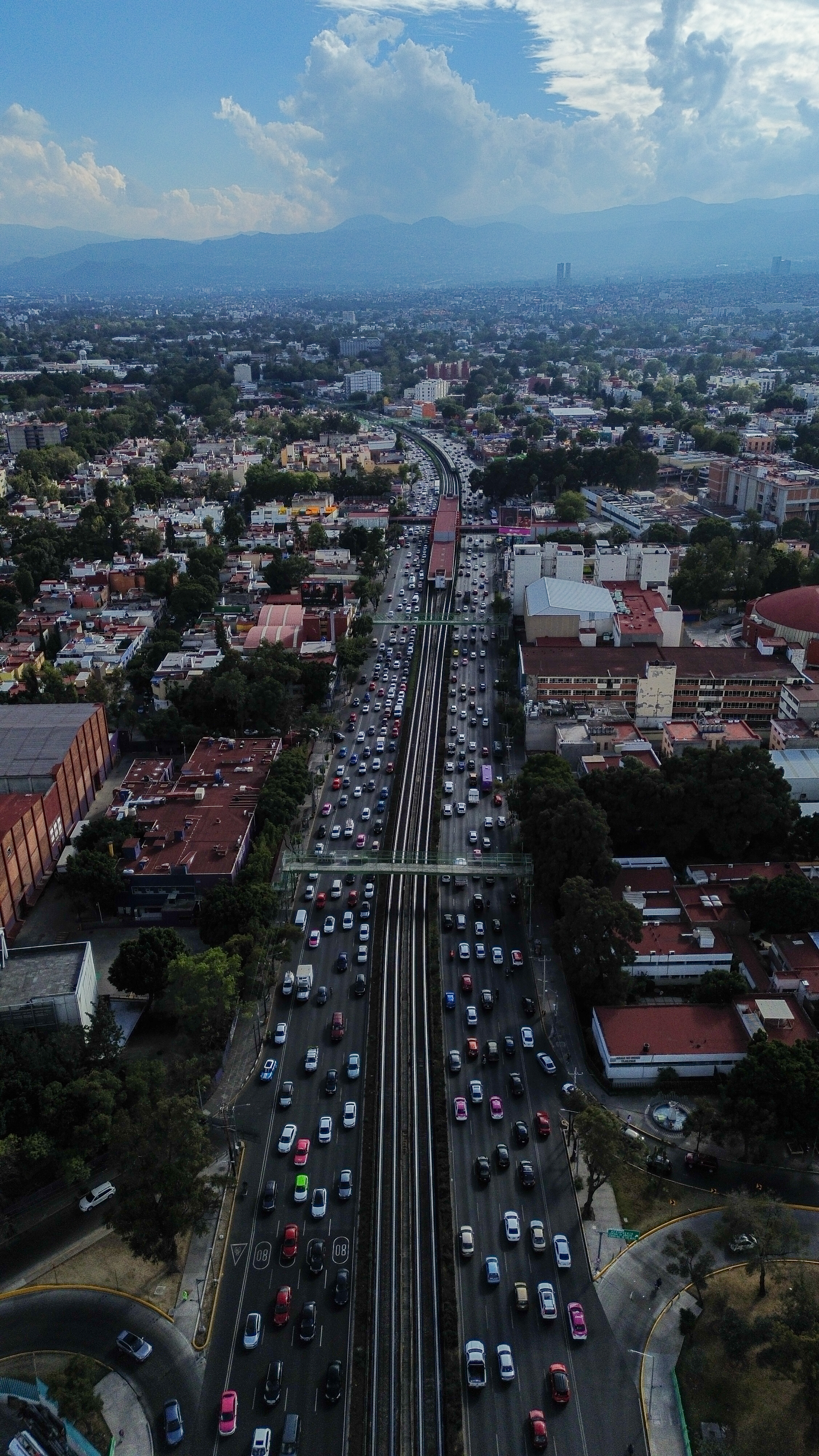
- Calzada de Tlalpan in Coyoacán
- Interactive map of Calzada de Tlalpan
- Length: 18 km (11 mi)
- From: Calzada de San Antonio Abad
- To: Avenida de los Insurgentes

Construction
- Inauguration: 1432

Video of the interchange between the Calzada de Tlalpan and the Circuito Interior.

The Calzada de Tlalpan ("causeway of Tlalpan") is a major north-south thoroughfare in Mexico City. Originally laid down to connect the island city of Tenochtitlan with the southern shores of Lake Texcoco, in its present-day form it connects the city's downtown with the highways heading south out from the city to the states of Morelos and Guerrero over a distance of 18 km.

== History ==
Construction of the causeway began during the reign of tlatoani Itzcoatl in 1432. It was one of three that linked Tenochtitlan with the shores of the surrounding lakes. In 1519 it was used by conquistador Hernán Cortés to enter the city.

== Modern day ==
Since 1970, Line 2 of the Mexico City Metro runs down the Calzada de Tlalpan's median after emerging from its underground section at San Antonio Abad station. The Mexico City Light Rail continues down the Calzada after the metro's terminus at Tasqueña. Both transit systems follow the right-of-way of a former tram line.

For vehicular traffic, the Calzada ends at its junction with Avenida Insurgentes in the borough of Tlalpan, where Federal Highways 95 and 95D continue south to Cuernavaca, Morelos, and beyond.

== See also ==
- Ciclovía La Gran Tenochtitlán
- Estadio Azteca
