= Gamiz =

Gamiz may refer to:

- Gamiz (surname)
- Gámiz, Álava, a village in Basque Country, Spain
- Gamiz, a former parish, now part of Gamiz-Fika, a town in Basque Country, Spain
