= Paseo de la Viga (painting) =

Painting by Pedro Villegas

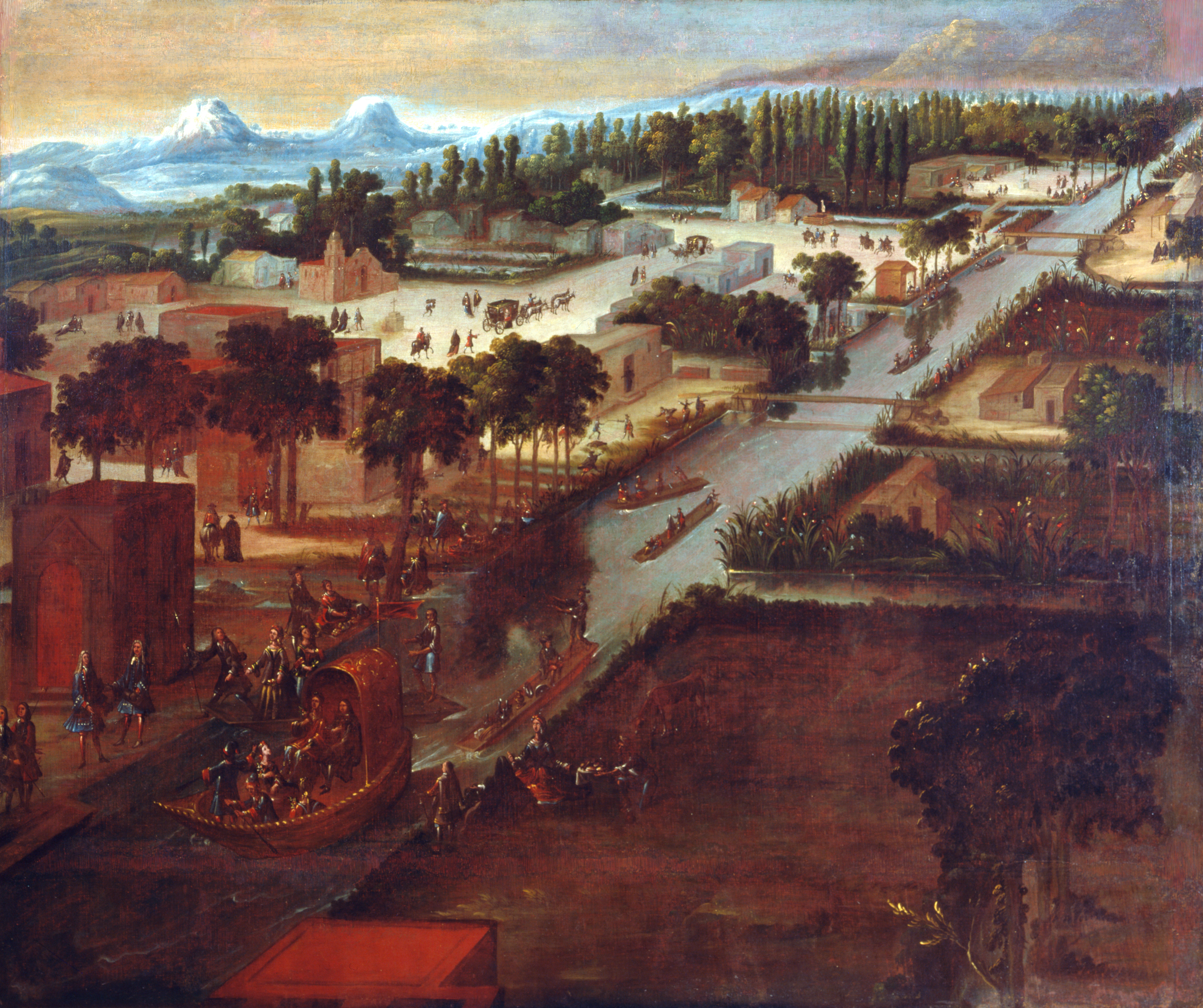
- Artist: Pedro Villegas
- Year: 1706

Paseo de la Viga with the Church of Iztacalco (Spanish: Paseo de la Viga con la iglesia de Iztacalco) is an oil painting. It was made by Pedro Villegas in 1706 and it is the oldest representation of the Paseo de la Viga, a Mexico City roadway.

It belongs to the collection of the Museo Soumaya in Mexico City.

== Description ==
La Viga was the road used by the merchants who walked from Chalco and Xochimilco, to then sell their products in the city. The painting shows the arrival of New Spain's viceroy, Francisco Fernández de la Cueva, and his wife Juana de la Cerda. They are represented in a boat and they come along with two women. Their social position is emphasized by a cloth structure that covers the couple.

The picture also represents the everyday life of the place: the merchants, the trajineras, chinampas, guardians, a church in Iztacalco, people walking around the place and the volcanoes Popocatépetl and Iztaccíhuatl.
