= Daniel Ordóñez Hernández =

Mexican lawyer and politician

Deputy of the Congress of the Union for the 13th district of the Federal District
- In office 1 September 2015 – 31 August 2018
- Preceded by: Roberto Carlos Reyes Gámiz
- Succeeded by: Mario Martín Delgado

Deputy of the Congress of the Union for the 14th district of the Federal District
- In office 1 September 2003 – 31 August 2006
- Preceded by: José Benjamín Muciño Pérez
- Succeeded by: Higinio Chávez García

Personal details
- Born: 13 June 1968 (age 57) Mexico City, Mexico
- Party: PRD
- Occupation: Lawyer and politician

Daniel Ordóñez Hernández (born 13 June 1968) is a Mexican lawyer and politician affiliated with the Party of the Democratic Revolution. He represented the 13th district of the Federal District as a deputy in the 68th Congress (2015–2018) and the Federal District's 14th district in the 59th Congress (2003–2006).

== Life ==
As he worked toward his law degree from the UNAM, which he obtained in 1993, Ordóñez served as a legal advisor to the PRD faction in the 55th Congress (1991–94) and again during the 57th Congress (1997–2000). However, Ordóñez primarily worked as a lawyer, being a partner at the law office of Ordóñez, Nava and Cisneros from 1994–95, as well as an associated lawyer for Grupo Abogados Empresariales between 1995 and 1998.

In the early 2000s, Ordóñez primarily served in various roles in the PRD. He was a state-level councilor from 1998 to 2005, a regional coordinator for the fourth electoral region in 2000, the National Affiliation Coordinator from 2000 to 2001, a special delegate from the national party when Boca del Río, Veracruz, had special internal elections in 2002, and a national councilor between 2003 and 2006.

In 2003, Ordóñez was elected to the Chamber of Deputies for the first time, representing the Federal District's 14th district in the 59th Congress. He was a secretary on two commissions: one dealing with government, as well as a special commission following corruption and public officials in the state of Morelos involved with drug trafficking.

After the 59th Congress concluded, Ordóñez served twice in the Legislative Assembly of the Federal District, from 2006 to 2009 and again from 2012 to 2015. In the first of two stints, he presided over the Commission for the Administration and Prosecution of Justice; in the second, he served on seven commissions and two committees. Between 2013 and 2015, Ordóñez was associated with the National Public Administration Institute (INAP).

Voters in the 13th district of the Federal District sent Ordóñez back to the Chamber of Deputies in 2015. During that term, he was the president of the Constitutional Points Committee and also served on two others: Federal District and Justice.
