= Xochimilco (disambiguation) =

Xochimilco is one of the 16 boroughs of Mexico City.

Xochimilco may also refer to:

- Xochimilco (altepetl), a pre-Columbian city-state
- Lake Xochimilco, an ancient endorheic lake
- Xochimilco light rail station, serving the borough
- Francisco Goitia light rail station, formerly named Xochimilco
