= Emilio Serrano =

Emilio Serrano may refer to

- Emilio Serrano y Ruiz (1850–1939), Spanish pianist and composer
- Emilio Serrano Jiménez (born 1950), Mexican politician
