= Gaceta UNAM =

Logo

Gaceta de la Universidad Nacional Autónoma de México (or Gaceta UNAM) is the newspaper for the National Autonomous University of Mexico (UNAM). It reports on cultural, scientific, cultural, sports and institutional about news in all organs of UNAM and all the institutions attached to the university.

It is published every Monday and Thursday to be delivered to all the facilities of UNAM (including institutions of secondary and higher incorporated into the UNAM Colegio de Ciencias y Humanidades and Escuela Nacional Preparatoria) and its digitized website.

The Gaceta was founded by professor Henrique Gonzalez Cazanova on August 23, 1954. In 2014 it turned 60 years old, with more than 80,000 notes, 627 4000 issues and more than 60 million copies distributed.
