= Escuela Nacional Preparatoria 1 "Gabino Barreda" =

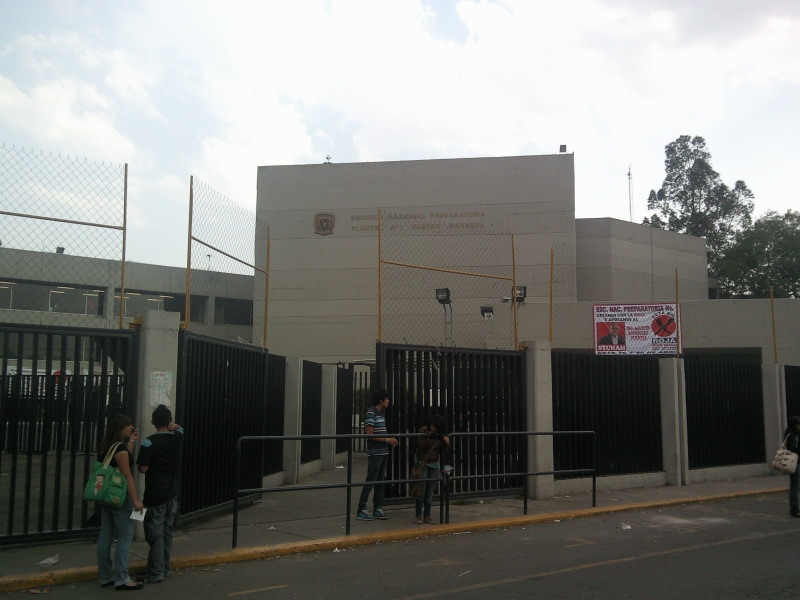
- Xochimilco, Mexico City; Mexico

Escuela Nacional Preparatoria Plantel 1 "Gabino Barreda" is a national senior high school of the National Autonomous University of Mexico (UNAM) Escuela Nacional Preparatoria (ENP1) system located in Xochimilco, Mexico City.
