= 14th federal electoral district of Mexico City =

Federal electoral district of Mexico

Mexico City's 14th
- Electoral district of the Chamber of Deputies of Mexico

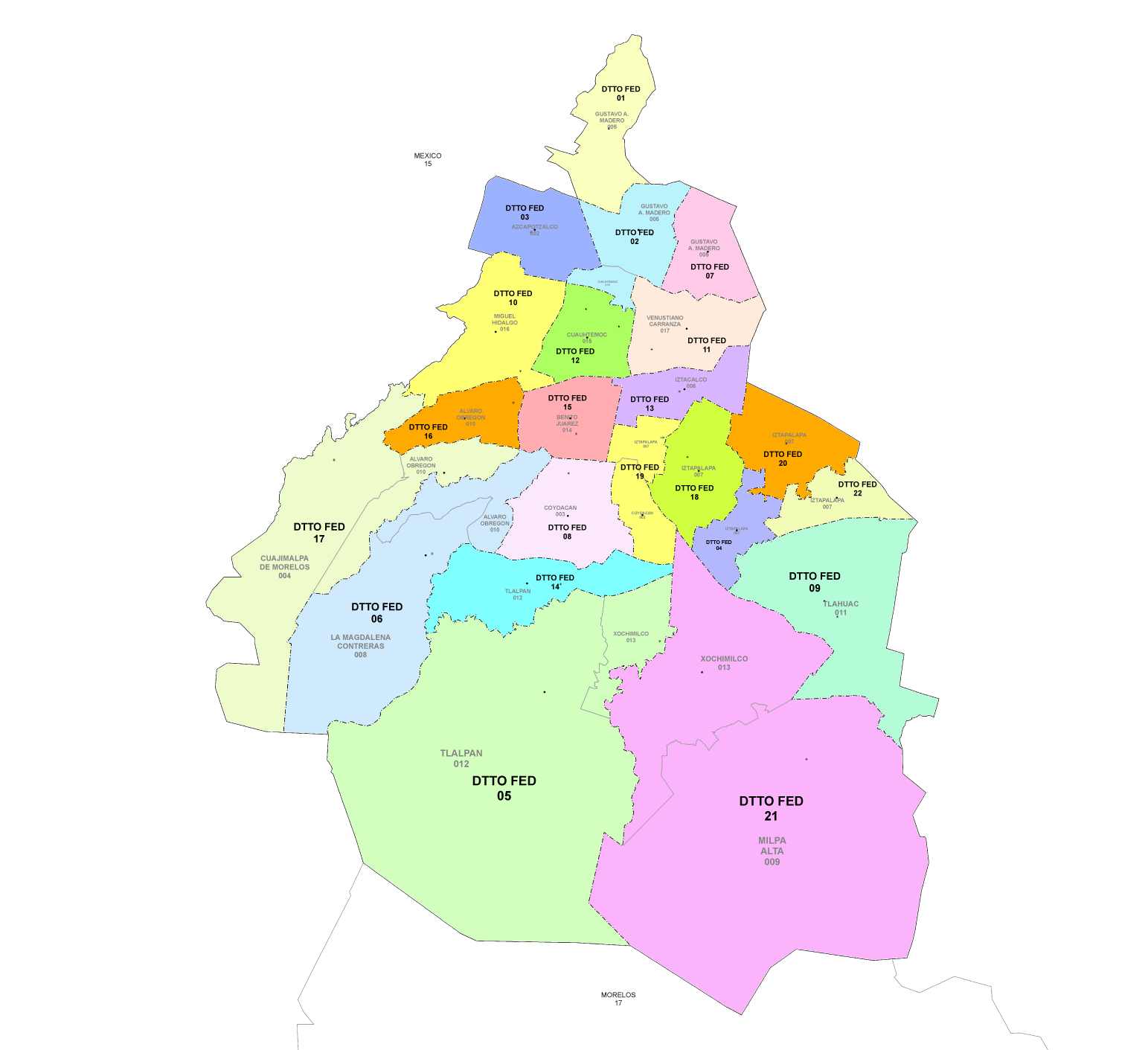
- 14th district since 2023

Incumbent
- Member: Carlos Hernández Mirón
- Party: ▌Morena
- Congress: 66th (2024–2027)

District
- State: Mexico City
- Head town: Tlalpan
- Coordinates: 19°18′30″N 99°13′30″W
- Covers: Tlalpan (part)
- PR region: Fourth
- Precincts: 259
- Population: 424,411 (2020 census)

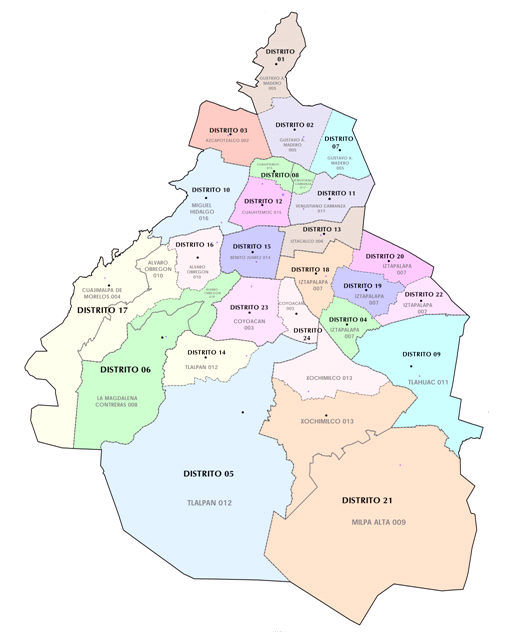
Mexico City under the 2017–2022 districting plan

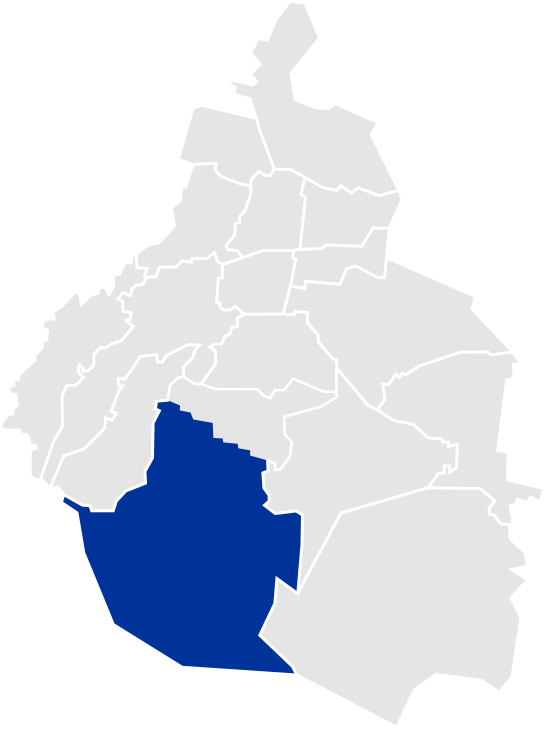
2005–2017 14th district shaded blue

The 14th federal electoral district of Mexico City (Spanish: Distrito electoral federal 14 de la Ciudad de México; previously "of the Federal District") is one of the 300 electoral districts into which Mexico is divided for elections to the federal Chamber of Deputies and one of the 22 currently operational districts in Mexico City.

It elects one deputy to the lower house of Congress for each three-year legislative session by means of the first-past-the-post system. Votes cast in the district also count towards the calculation of proportional representation ("plurinominal") deputies elected from the fourth region.

The current member for the district, elected in the 2024 general election, is Carlos Hernández Mirón of the National Regeneration Movement (Morena).

== District territory ==
Under the 2023 districting plan adopted by the National Electoral Institute (INE), which is to be used for the 2024, 2027 and 2030 federal elections, the 14th district covers 259 electoral precincts (secciones electorales) in the northern (urban) portion of the borough (alcaldía) of Tlalpan.

The district reported a population of 424,411 in the 2020 census.

== Previous districting schemes ==
Evolution of electoral district numbers
	1974	1978	1996	2005	2017	2023
Mexico City (Federal District)	27	40	30	27	24	22
Chamber of Deputies	196	300				

2017–2022

Between 2017 and 2022 the 14th district covered the northern, more urban part of Tlalpan.

2005–2017

Under the 2005 districting scheme, the 14th district covered the southern portion of the borough (delegación) of Tlalpan.

1996–2005

Between 1996 and 2005, the district covered the eastern portion of Benito Juárez and the westernmost third of Iztacalco.

1978–1996

The districting scheme in force from 1978 to 1996 was the result of the 1977 electoral reforms, which increased the number of single-member seats in the Chamber of Deputies from 196 to 300. Under that plan, the Federal District's seat allocation rose from 27 to 40. The 14th district covered portions of the boroughs of Iztacalco and Venustiano Carranza in the centre of the city.

== Deputies returned to Congress ==
(Mexico) National parties
- Current
- PAN
- PRI
- PT
- PVEM
- MC
- Morena
- PAZ
- Somos
- Defunct or local only
- PLM
- PNR
- PRM
- PNM
- PP
- PPS
- PARM
- PFCRN
- CON
- PANAL
- PSD
- PES
- PES
- PRD

Mexico City's 14th district
Election	Deputy	Party	Term	Legislature
The 14th district was suspended between 1865 and 1922
1922	Romeo Ortega	Laborist Party (Mexico)	1922–1924	30th Congress
1924	Rafael Ponce de León	Laborist Party (Mexico)	1924–1926	31st Congress
1926	Arturo de Saracho Valenzuela	Laborist Party (Mexico)	1926–1928	32nd Congress
1928	Aurelio Manrique Jr.	PO	1928–1930	33rd Congress
The 14th district was suspended between 1930 and 1952 (Note: An amendment to Article 52 of the Constitution in 1928 changed the original provision of "one deputy per 60,000 inhabitants" to "one deputy per 100,000"; as a result, the size of the Chamber of Deputies fell from 281 in the 1928 election to 171 in 1934.)
1952	Juventino Aguilar Moreno	Partido Nacionalista Mexicano	1952–1955	42nd Congress
1955	Ramón Castilleja Zárate	Institutional Revolutionary Party	1955–1958	43rd Congress
1958	Rafael Buitrón Maldonado	Institutional Revolutionary Party	1958–1961	44th Congress
1961	Rómulo Sánchez Mireles	Institutional Revolutionary Party	1961–1964	45th Congress
1964	Manuel Contreras Carrillo	Institutional Revolutionary Party	1964–1967	46th Congress
1967	Alberto Briceño Ruiz	Institutional Revolutionary Party	1967–1970	47th Congress
1970	Luis Velázquez Jaacks	Institutional Revolutionary Party	1970–1973	48th Congress
1973	Onofre Hernández Rivera	Institutional Revolutionary Party	1973–1976	49th Congress
1976	Jorge Mendicutti Negrete	Institutional Revolutionary Party	1976–1979	50th Congress
1979	Eduardo Rosas González	Institutional Revolutionary Party	1979–1982	51st Congress
1982	Álvaro Brito Alonso	Institutional Revolutionary Party	1982–1985	52nd Congress
1985	Lorenzo Silva Ruiz	Institutional Revolutionary Party	1985–1988	53rd Congress
1988	Serafín Ramírez Ramírez	National Action Party (Mexico)	1988–1991	54th Congress
1991	José Guadalupe Rodríguez Rivera	Institutional Revolutionary Party	1991–1994	55th Congress
1994	Lourdes Torre Gutiérrez	Institutional Revolutionary Party	1994–1997	56th Congress
1997	Gilberto López y Rivas	Party of the Democratic Revolution	1997–2000	57th Congress
2000	José Benjamín Muciño Pérez		2000–2003	58th Congress
2003	Daniel Ordóñez Hernández		2003–2006	59th Congress
2006	Higinio Chávez García		2006–2009	60th Congress
2009	Héctor Hugo Hernández Rodríguez		2009–2012	61st Congress
2012	Martha Lucía Mícher Camarena		2012–2015	62nd Congress
2015	Carlos Hernández Mirón		2015–2018	63rd Congress
2018	Alfonso Ramírez Cuéllar; Javier Uriel Aguirre Valenciana		2018–2020; 2020–2021	64th Congress
2021	Rocío Banquells (Note: Elected for the PRD but switched to the Citizens' Movement in February 2022.)		2021–2024	65th Congress
2024	Carlos Hernández Mirón		2024–2027	66th Congress

== Presidential elections ==
Mexico City's 14th district
Election	District won by	Party or coalition	%
2018	Andrés Manuel López Obrador	Juntos Haremos Historia	61.9632
2024	Claudia Sheinbaum Pardo	Sigamos Haciendo Historia	50.4012
