= 13th federal electoral district of Mexico City =

Federal electoral district of Mexico

Mexico City's 13th
- Electoral district of the Chamber of Deputies of Mexico

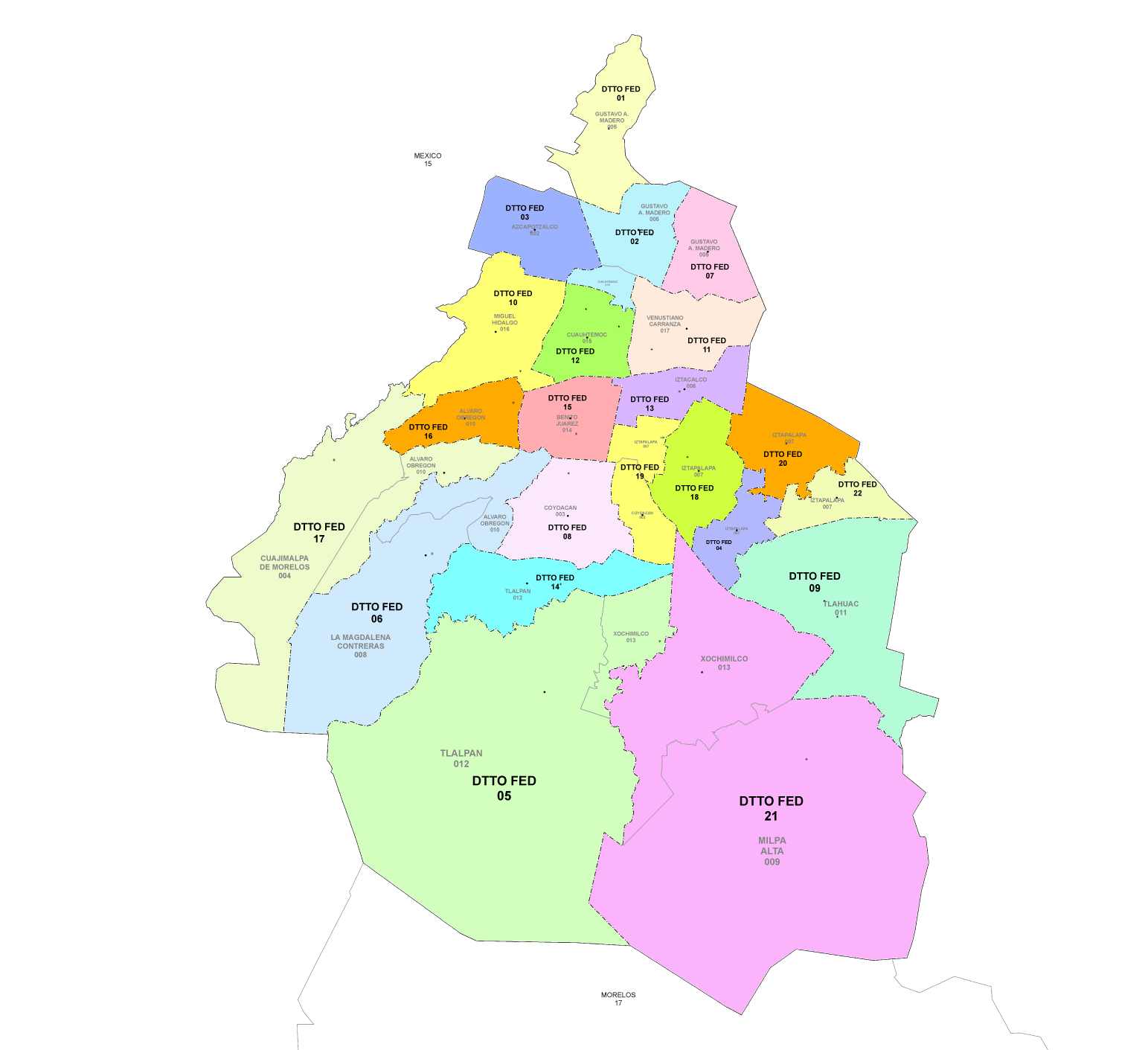
- 13th district since 2023

Incumbent
- Member: Francisco Sánchez Cervantes
- Party: ▌Morena
- Congress: 66th (2024–2027)

District
- State: Mexico City
- Head town: Iztacalco
- Coordinates: 19°23′43″N 99°05′52″W
- Covers: Iztacalco
- PR region: Fourth
- Precincts: 299
- Population: 404,643 (2020 census)

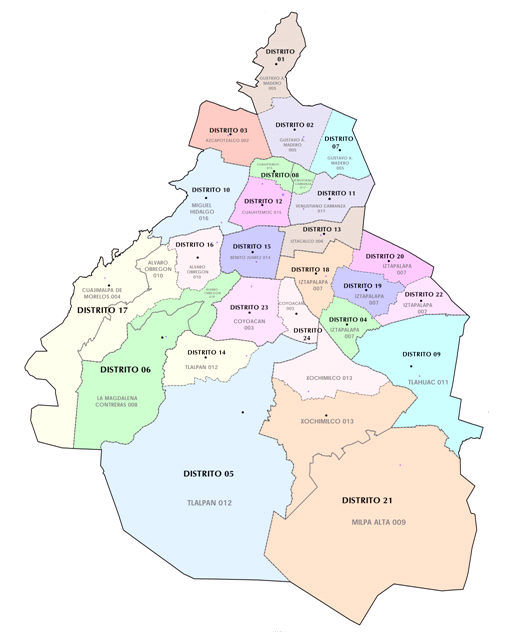
Mexico City under the 2017–2022 districting plan

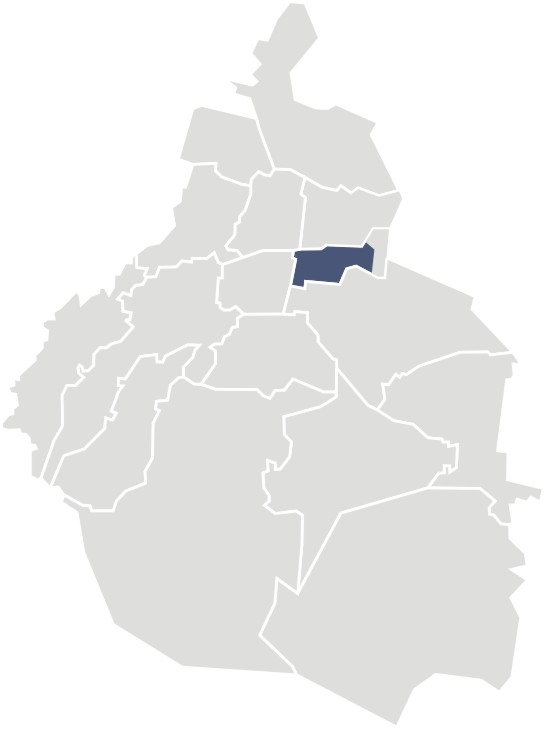
13th district in 2005–2017

The 13th federal electoral district of Mexico City (Spanish: Distrito electoral federal 13 de la Ciudad de México; previously "of the Federal District") is one of the 300 electoral districts into which Mexico is divided for elections to the federal Chamber of Deputies and one of 22 such districts in Mexico City.

It elects one deputy to the lower house of Congress for each three-year legislative session by means of the first-past-the-post system. Votes cast in the district also count towards the calculation of proportional representation ("plurinominal") deputies elected from the fourth region.

The current member for the district, elected in the 2024 general election, is Francisco Sánchez Cervantes of the National Regeneration Movement (Morena).

== District territory ==
Under the 2023 districting plan adopted by the National Electoral Institute (INE), which is to be used for the 2024, 2027 and 2030 federal elections, the thirteenth district covers the 299 electoral precincts (secciones electorales) that make up the borough (alcaldía) of Iztacalco.

The district reported a population of 404,643 in the 2020 census.

== Previous districting schemes ==
Evolution of electoral district numbers
	1974	1978	1996	2005	2017	2023
Mexico City (Federal District)	27	40	30	27	24	22
Chamber of Deputies	196	300				

2017–2022

From 2017 to 2022, the district covered a portion of the borough of Venustiano Carranza, with the remainder assigned to the 8th district.

2005–2017

Under the 2005 districting scheme, the 13th district covered the whole of Iztacalco, with the exception of its easternmost sector, which belonged to the 11th district.

1996–2005

Between 1996 and 2005, the district covered the central and eastern portions of Iztacalco.

1978–1996

The districting scheme in force from 1978 to 1996 was the result of the 1977 electoral reforms, which increased the number of single-member seats in the Chamber of Deputies from 196 to 300. Under that plan, the Federal District's seat allocation rose from 27 to 40. The 13th district covered a portion of Venustiano Carranza.

== Deputies returned to Congress ==
(Mexico) National parties
- Current
- PAN
- PRI
- PT
- PVEM
- MC
- Morena
- PAZ
- Somos
- Defunct or local only
- PLM
- PNR
- PRM
- PNM
- PP
- PPS
- PARM
- PFCRN
- CON
- PANAL
- PSD
- PES
- PES
- PRD

Mexico City's 13th district
Election	Deputy	Party	Term	Legislature
The 13th district was suspended between 1865 and 1922
1922	Rubén Vizcarra	Laborist Party (Mexico)	1922–1924	30th Congress
1924	Rafael Delhumeán Jr.	Laborist Party (Mexico)	1924–1926	31st Congress
1926	Carlos Aragón	Laborist Party (Mexico)	1926–1928	32nd Congress
1928	Tomás A. Robinson	PO	1928–1930	33rd Congress
The 13th district was suspended between 1930 and 1952 (Note: An amendment to Article 52 of the Constitution in 1928 changed the original provision of "one deputy per 60,000 inhabitants" to "one deputy per 100,000"; as a result, the size of the Chamber of Deputies fell from 281 in the 1928 election to 171 in 1934.)
1952	Fidel Ruiz Moreno	Institutional Revolutionary Party	1952–1955	42nd Congress
1955	Vacant		1955–1958	43rd Congress
1958	Gastón Novelo Von Glumer	Institutional Revolutionary Party	1958–1961	44th Congress
1961	Carlos L. Díaz	Institutional Revolutionary Party	1961–1964	45th Congress
1964	Hilda Anderson Nevárez	Institutional Revolutionary Party	1964–1967	46th Congress
1967	Joaquín Gamboa Pascoe	Institutional Revolutionary Party	1967–1970	47th Congress
1970	Leopoldo Cerón Sánchez	Institutional Revolutionary Party	1970–1973	48th Congress
1973	Javier Blanco Sánchez	National Action Party (Mexico)	1973–1976	49th Congress
1976	Rodolfo González Guevara	Institutional Revolutionary Party	1976–1979	50th Congress
1979	Joel Ayala Almeida	Institutional Revolutionary Party	1979–1982	51st Congress
1982	Hilda Anderson Nevárez	Institutional Revolutionary Party	1982–1985	52nd Congress
1985	Federico Durán y Liñán	Institutional Revolutionary Party	1985–1988	53rd Congress
1988	Hilda Anderson Nevárez	Institutional Revolutionary Party	1988–1991	54th Congress
1991	Aníbal Pacheco López	Institutional Revolutionary Party	1991–1994	55th Congress
1994	Fernando Salgado Delgado	Institutional Revolutionary Party	1994–1997	56th Congress
1997	Bruno Espejel Basaldúa	Party of the Democratic Revolution	1997–2000	57th Congress
2000	Máximo Soto Gómez	National Action Party (Mexico)	2000–2003	58th Congress
2003	Emilio Serrano Jiménez	Party of the Democratic Revolution	2003–2006	59th Congress
2006	Pablo Trejo Pérez	Party of the Democratic Revolution	2006–2009	60th Congress
2009	Emilio Serrano Jiménez	Party of the Democratic Revolution	2009–2012	61st Congress
2012	Roberto Carlos Reyes Gámiz	Party of the Democratic Revolution	2012–2015	62nd Congress
2015	Daniel Ordóñez Hernández	Party of the Democratic Revolution	2015–2018	63rd Congress
2018	Mario Delgado Carrillo; Óscar Gutiérrez Camacho	National Regeneration Movement	2018–2020; 2020–2021	64th Congress
2021	Óscar Gutiérrez Camacho	National Regeneration Movement	2021–2024	65th Congress
2024	Francisco Javier Sánchez Cervantes	National Regeneration Movement	2024–2027	66th Congress

== Presidential elections ==
Mexico City's 13th district
Election	District won by	Party or coalition	%
2018	Andrés Manuel López Obrador	Juntos Haremos Historia	58.9686
2024	Claudia Sheinbaum Pardo	Sigamos Haciendo Historia	55.9408
