= Puebla metro station =

Mexico City metro station

Puebla
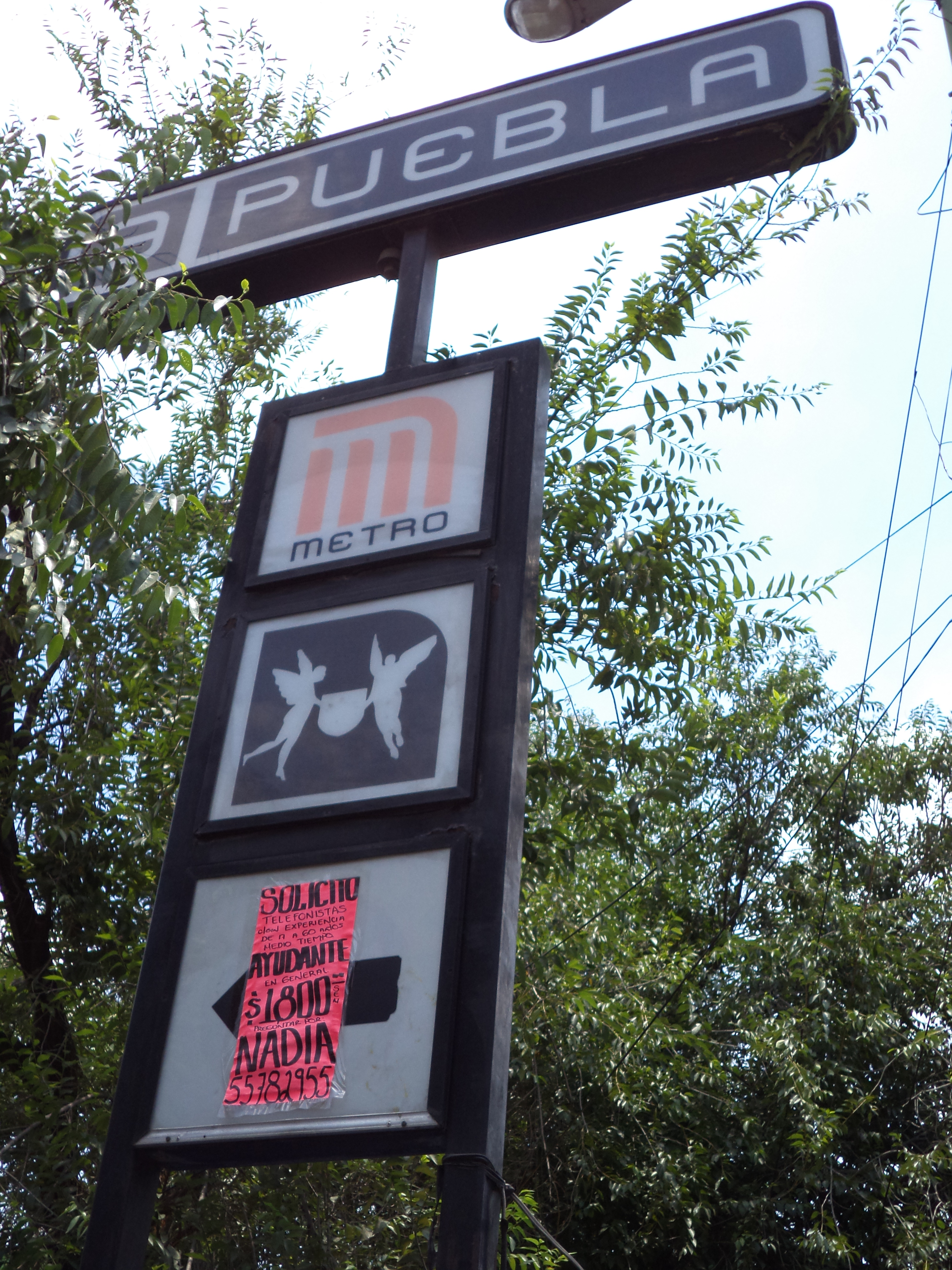

General information
- Location: Mexico City; Mexico
- Coordinates: 19°24′26″N 99°04′57″W
- System: Mexico City Metro
- Platforms: 2 side platforms
- Tracks: 2

Construction
- Structure type: Elevated

Other information
- Status: In service

History
- Opened: 26 August 1987; 39 years ago

Key dates
- 17 December 2023; 2 years ago: Temporarily closed
- 10 September 2024; 2 years ago: Reopened

Passengers
- 2025: 13,632,939 (Note: The data here is limited to the most recent ten years to avoid excessive listings; earlier figures can be found in this page's history or on the Mexico City Metro website. To calculate the average daily ridership, the annual total is divided by 365 days (366 in leap years), with decimals omitted from the result. Each station per line is ranked individually, as the system counts transfer stations separately. The percentage change is calculated automatically using the data from the current year and the previous year.) ▲241.25%
- Rank: 36/195

Services
Preceding station	Mexico City Metro	Following station
Ciudad Deportiva toward Tacubaya	Line 9	Pantitlán Terminus
Route map
Location
- Location within Mexico City
- Area map

Puebla is a station on the Mexico City Metro. It is located in the Puebla district of the Iztacalco delegation of Mexico City; both the area it is located in and the station are named for the nearby city of Puebla. The station logo depicts two angels carrying a shield, as the city is commonly called The City of Angels.

The station is elevated and has two entrances on opposite sides of the avenue. Street vendors occupy the areas around the station entrances and a bus depot is underneath the Metro Line. Puebla is often used by commuters wishing to cross the city from the east, who wish to avoid the relative overcrowding of the terminal station Pantitlán. Due to subsidance in Pantitlán, Puebla was temporarily closed.

== Ridership ==
Annual passenger ridership
Year	Ridership	Average daily	Rank	% change	Ref.
2025	9,267,334	25,389	36/195	+241.25%
2024	2,715,718	7,419	151/195	−80.08%
2023	13,632,939	37,350	11/195	+21.61%
2022	11,209,946	30,712	19/195	+58.58%
2021	7,068,973	19,367	27/195	−3.80%
2020	7,348,054	20,076	27/195	−39.70%
2019	12,185,200	33,384	32/195	−0.08%
2018	12,194,837	33,410	30/195	+2.94%
2017	11,846,171	32,455	35/195	−0.39%
2016	11,892,743	32,582	37/195	−6.05%

== See also ==
- Autódromo Hermanos Rodríguez – nearby
