= Pablo Trejo Pérez =

Mexican politician

Deputy of the Congress of the Union for the 13th district of the Federal District
- In office 1 September 2006 – 31 August 2009
- Preceded by: Emilio Serrano Jiménez
- Succeeded by: Emilio Serrano Jiménez

Personal details
- Born: 24 January 1964 (age 62) Mexico City, Mexico
- Party: PRD
- Occupation: Politician

Pablo Trejo Pérez (born 24 January 1964) is a Mexican politician affiliated with the Party of the Democratic Revolution (PRD). In 2006–2009 he served as a federal deputy in the 60th Congress, representing the Federal District's thirteenth district for the PRD.
