= Hilda Anderson Nevárez =

Mexican trade union leader and politician

Deputy of the Congress of the Union for the 4th electoral region
- In office 1 September 2000 – 31 August 2003
- Constituency: Federal District

Deputy of the Congress of the Union for the 13th district of the Federal District
- In office 1 September 1988 – 31 August 1991
- Preceded by: Federico Durán y Liñán
- Succeeded by: Anibal Pacheco López
- In office 1 September 1982 – 31 August 1985
- Preceded by: Joel Ayala Almeída
- Succeeded by: Federico Durán y Liñán
- In office 1 September 1964 – 31 August 1967
- Preceded by: Carlos L. Díaz
- Succeeded by: Joaquín Gamboa Pascoe

Deputy of the Congress of the Union for the 19th district of the Federal District
- In office 1 September 1970 – 31 August 1973
- Preceded by: Adolfo Ruiz Sosa
- Succeeded by: José María Leoncio Aleja Ruíz Zavala

Personal details
- Born: 10 October 1938 Mazatlán, Sinaloa, Mexico
- Died: 5 July 2011 (aged 72) Mexico City, Mexico
- Party: PRI
- Occupation: Trade union leader and politician

Hilda Josefina Amalia Anderson Nevárez (Note: In this Mexican name, the surname is Anderson and the second or maternal family name is Nevárez.) (10 October 1938 – 5 July 2011) was a Mexican trade union leader and politician from the Institutional Revolutionary Party (PRI). She served as a federal deputy in five sessions of Congress (1964–67; 1970–73; 1982–85; 1988–91 and 2000–03) and as Senator from 1976 to 1982 representing Sinaloa.

She died on 5 July 2011.
