= Island of the Dolls =

Island in Xochimilco, Mexico City

Coordinates: 19°16′22.4″N 99°05′17.2″W

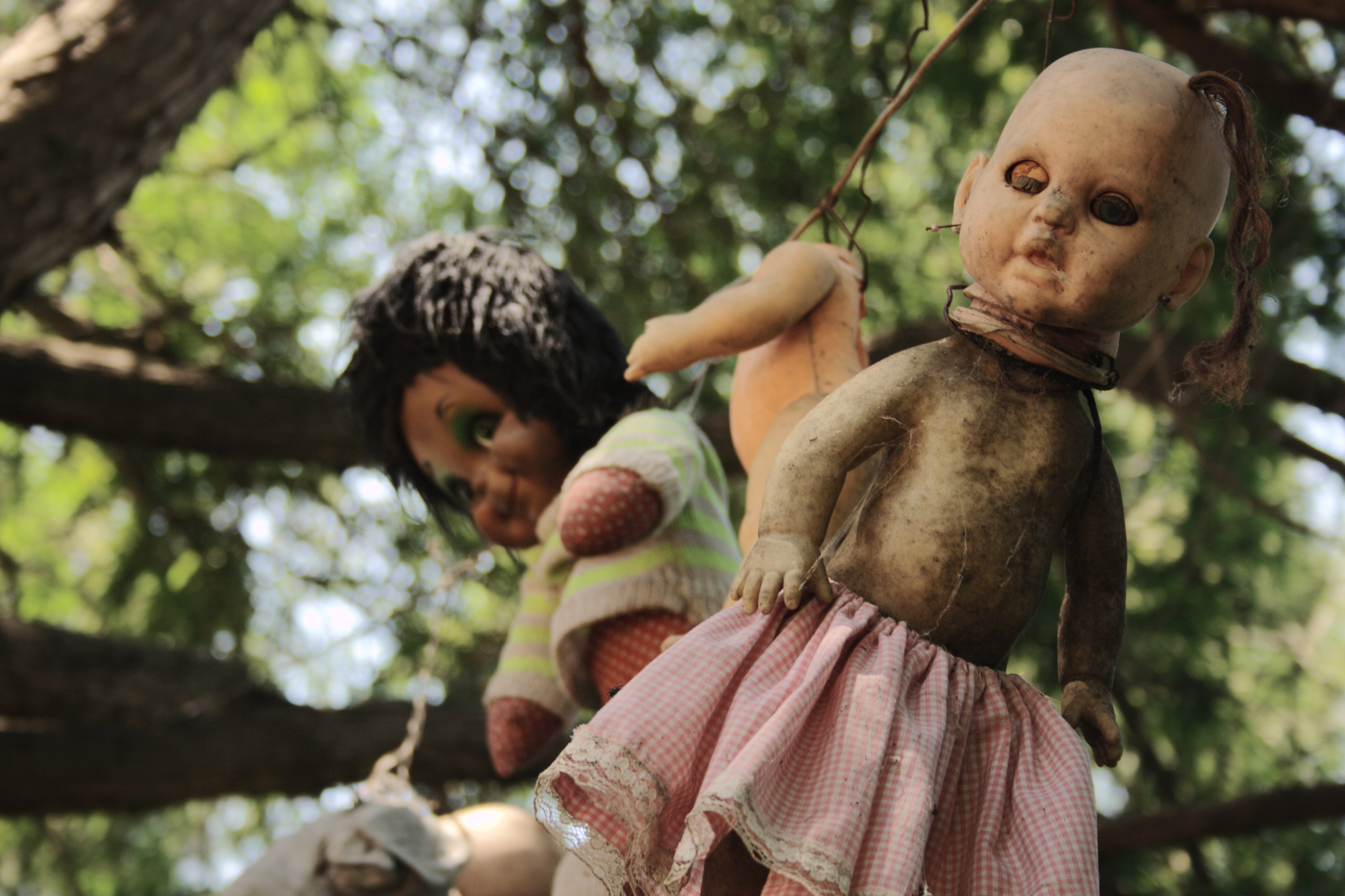
Barrera's dolls on the Island of the Dolls, Mexico City

The Island of the Dolls (Spanish: Isla de las Muñecas) is a chinampa of the Laguna de Tequila located in the channels of Xochimilco, south of the center of Mexico City, Mexico. A multitude of dolls of various styles and colors can be found throughout the island. Local legends surround the dolls and the island's reclusive former owner, Don Julián Santana Barrera, making the island a popular destination for dark tourism. In 2022, Guinness World Records recognized the island as hosting the world’s largest collection of haunted dolls.

== History ==
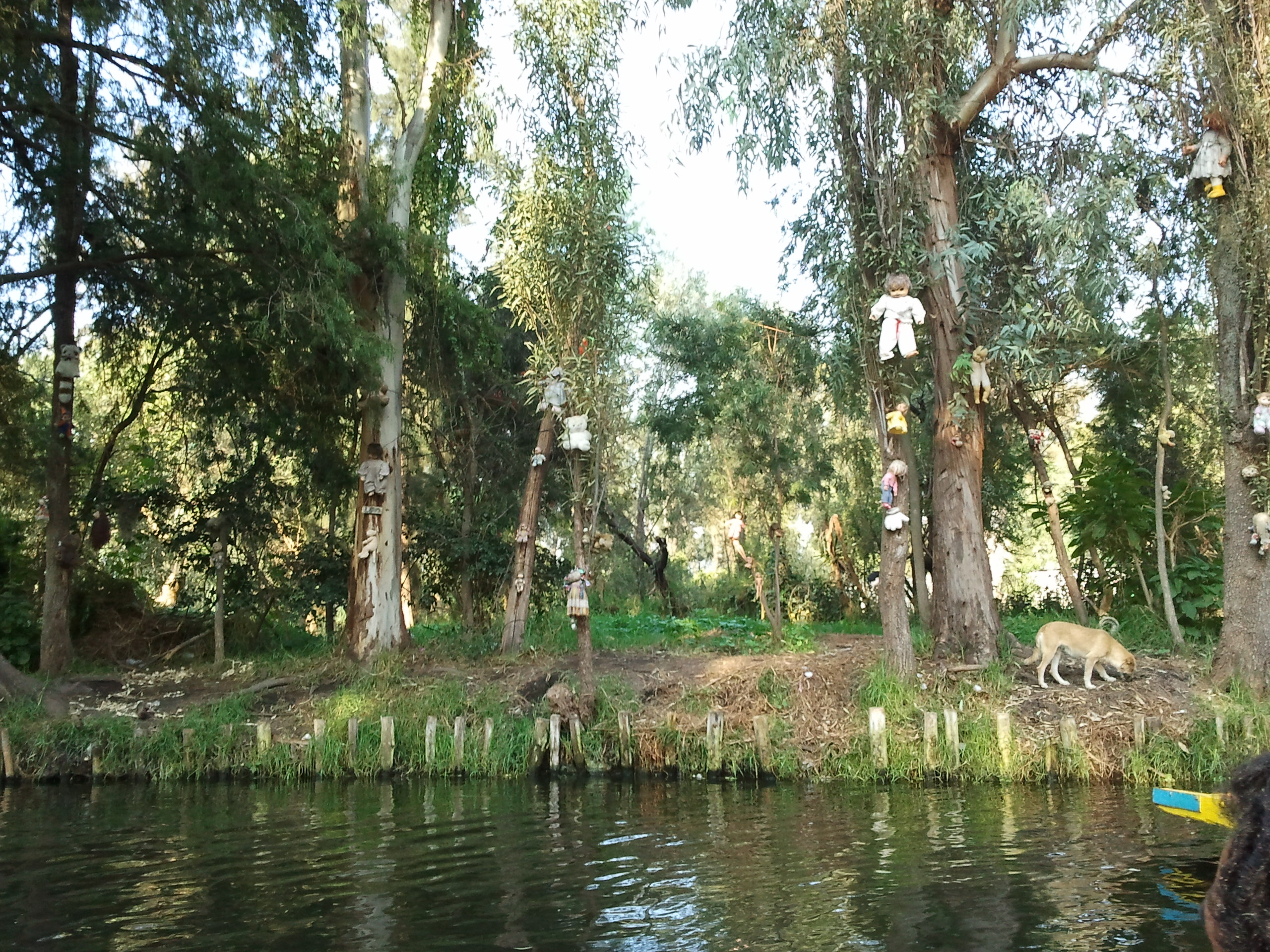
Dolls seen from the lake

In the mid-20th century, Don Julián Santana Barrera began to collect dolls and hang them around the small island. The island gained notoriety in 1943 when Mexican director Emilio Fernández used it as the location of the film María Candelaria. After Barrera's death in 2001, his family opened the island to the public as a tourist attraction. In addition to the hundreds of dolls, the grounds host three huts, and a small museum with articles from local newspapers about both the island and the previous owner. In the one-room hut Barrera slept in, the first doll Barrera collected is displayed, as well as Agustina, his favorite doll.

The Island of the Dolls is accessible to the public via gondola-like boats referred to as trajineras. Most rowers are willing to transport people to the island, but there are those who refuse out of superstition. The journey often includes a tour of the Ecological Area, Ajolote Museum, Apatlaco Canal, Teshuilo Lagoon and Llorona Island.

== Legend ==
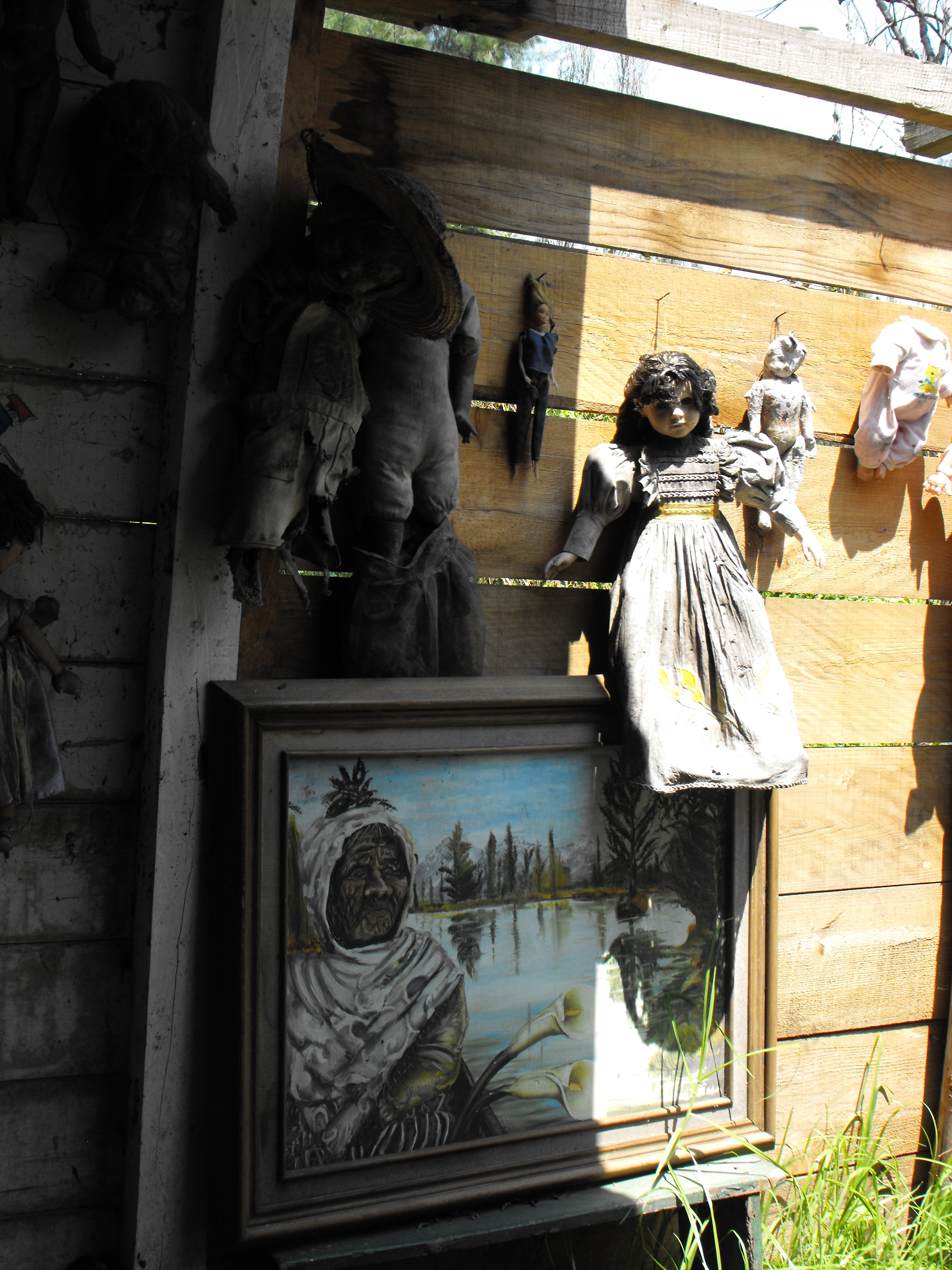
Oldest doll on the Island of the Dolls, in Xochimilco, Mexico City

Barrera is said to have either come across the body of a girl floating in the canals or failed to save her from drowning. The next day, Barrera found a doll drifting down the canal; believing it belonged to the girl, he hung the doll from a tree in her memory and as a talisman to ward off evil spirits. It is sometimes claimed that Barrera found a second doll in the canal the next day. It is speculated that after her death the young girl's spirit haunted the island, and to appease her Barrera began scouring the trash and trading produce from his garden in exchange for more dolls. Evidence of the girl's existence has yet to be reported.

In 2001, Barrera's nephew came to the island to help his uncle. As they fished in the canal, Barrera, then 80, sang passionately, claiming that mermaids in the water were calling for him. The nephew left briefly, and upon his return found Barrera lifeless, face down in the canal, in the same spot where the girl was said to have drowned.

Since the island became open to the public, there have been reports of the dolls moving their heads, arms, and opening their eyes. Visitors also claim to have heard the dolls whispering to each other. Visitors occasionally place offerings around the dolls in exchange for miracles and blessings. Some change the dolls' clothes and maintain the island as a form of worship.
