= Escuela Nacional Preparatoria 2 "Erasmo Castellanos Quinto" =

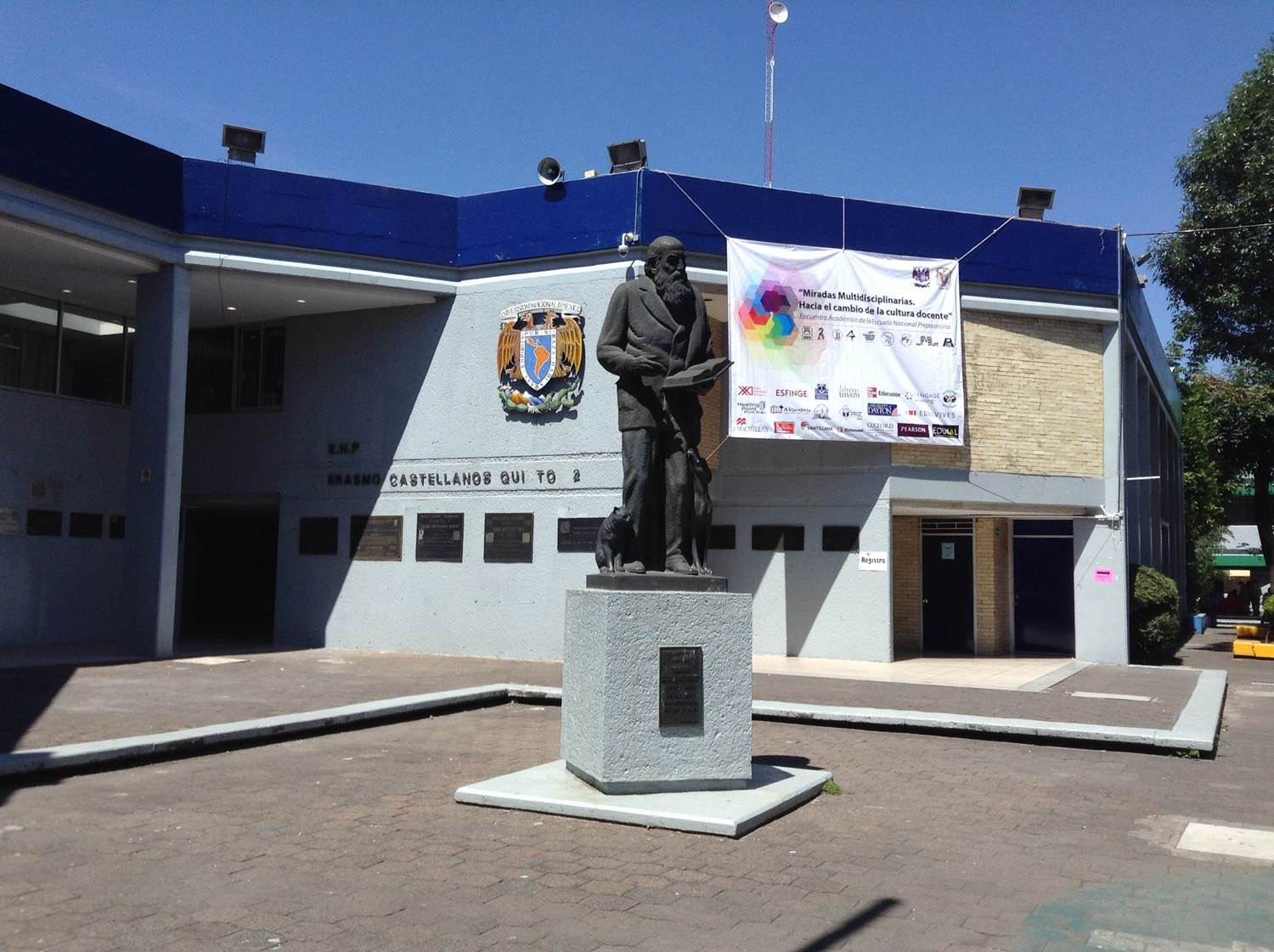
- Iztacalco, Mexico City; Mexico

Escuela Nacional Preparatoria Plantel 2 "Erasmo Castellanos Quinto" is a national senior high school of the National Autonomous University of Mexico (UNAM) Escuela Nacional Preparatoria system located in Iztacalco, Mexico City.
