= Gamiz (surname) =

Gamiz may refer to two surnames: Gámiz and Gamíz.

Notable people with the surname Gámiz include:

- Andrea Gámiz (born 1992), Venezuelan tennis player
- Pedro López de Gámiz (1528–1588), Spanish sculptor
- Roberto Carlos Reyes Gámiz (born 1969), Mexican politician
- Sergio Gámiz (born 1978), Spanish footballer

Notable people with the surname Gamíz include:

- Luis Gamíz (born 2000), Mexican footballer
