= Nevarez =

Nevarez or Nevárez is a surname. Notable people with the surname include:

- Angel Nevarez, American artist
- Francisco Nevarez (born 2000), Mexican footballer
- Gloria Nevarez, American sports executive
- Hilda Anderson Nevárez (1938–2011), Mexican trade union leader and politician
- Micaela Nevárez (born 1972), Puerto Rican actress
- Pedro Ávila Nevárez (1937–2020), Mexican politician
- Poncho Nevárez (born 1972), American politician
