= Xochimilco light rail station =

Rail station in southern Mexico City

Xochimilco
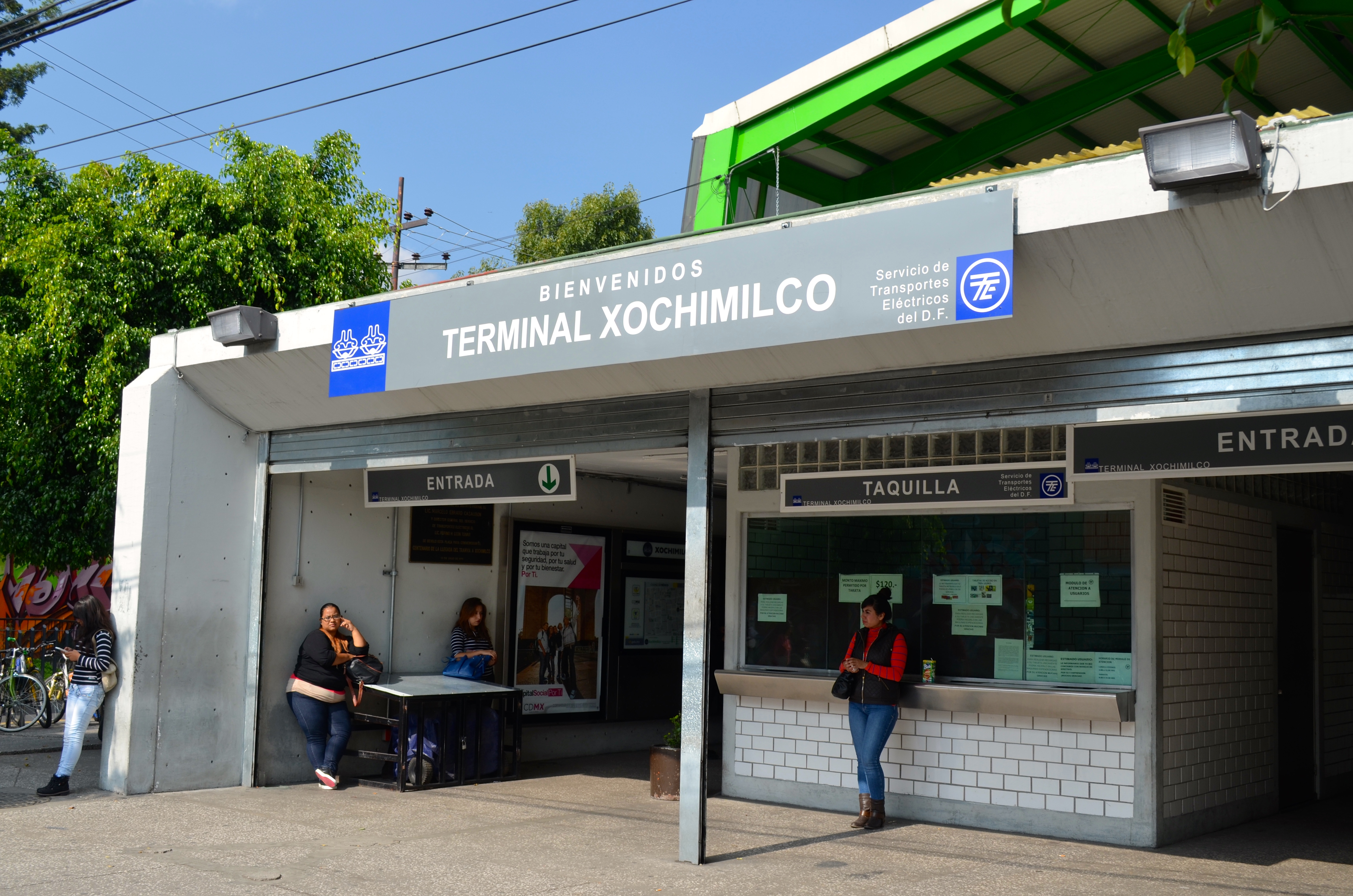
- Station

General information
- Location: Cuauhtémoc y Gladiolas. Col. Barrio de San Pedro. Xochimilco, Mexico City; Mexico
- Coordinates: 19°15′33″N 99°06′28″W
- System: Mexico City Light Rail
- Owner: Government of Mexico City
- Operator: Servicio de Transportes Eléctricos (STE)
- Platforms: 2 side platforms; 1 island platform
- Tracks: 3

Construction
- Structure type: At-grade

History
- Opened: 14 September 1995
- Rebuilt: 14 December 2008
- Former names: Embarcadero

Services
Preceding station	STE	Following station
Francisco Goitia toward Tasqueña	Mexico City Light Rail	Terminus
Route map
Location
- Location within Mexico City urban area
- Area map

Xochimilco is the southern terminal of the Mexico City Light Rail. It is located in the south of Mexico City in the borough of Xochimilco.

== Information ==
Xochimilco is the southern terminal station of the Light Rail, located in the center of the borough that bears the same name, famous for its trajineras, chinampas, and the extensive network of canals that is the home to flora and fauna that once existed throughout the valley of Mexico. The logo of the terminal is the glyph that means "Xochimilco".

In November 2007, the relocation and construction of the new station began to increase the capacity of the service, in what was previously a maintenance workshop of the Light Rail. The old station, whose infrastructure had two platforms and a single track for the light train, was demolished and instead is a two-track railway with an island platform that serves to access the new station. The new station was officially opened on 14 December 2008.

== Station layout ==
The station makes use of the Spanish solution.

Street level	Mezzanine access to the platform
1	Departures from the platforms to Cuauhtémoc and Gladiolas streets
Platforms	Side platform, doors open to the right (disembarking only)
Platforms	Xochimilco	← towards Tasqueña (Francisco Goitia)
Platforms	Island platform, doors open to the left (boarding only)
Platforms	Xochimilco	← towards Tasqueña (Francisco Goitia)
Platforms	Side platform, doors open to the right (disembarking only)
