= Emilio Serrano Jiménez =

Mexican politician

Deputy of the Congress of the Union for the 13th district of the Federal District
- In office 1 September 2009 – 31 August 2012
- Preceded by: Pablo Trejo Pérez
- Succeeded by: Roberto Carlos Reyes Gámiz
- In office 1 September 2003 – 31 August 2006
- Preceded by: Máximo Soto Gómez
- Succeeded by: Pablo Trejo Pérez

Personal details
- Born: 21 May 1950 (age 75) Mexico City, Mexico
- Party: PRD
- Occupation: Politician

Emilio Serrano Jiménez (born 21 May 1950) is a Mexican politician affiliated with the Party of the Democratic Revolution (PRD).

Serrano Jiménez has served as a federal deputy on two occasions, representing the 13th district of the Federal District for the PRD on both:

- 2003 to 2006, in the 59th Congress
- 2009 to 2012 in the 61st Congress
