= Máximo Soto Gómez =

Mexican politician

Deputy of the Congress of the Union for the 13th district of the Federal District
- In office 1 September 2000 – 31 August 2003
- Preceded by: Bruno Espejel Basaldúa
- Succeeded by: Emilio Serrano Jiménez

Personal details
- Born: 11 May 1949 (age 76) Mexico City, Mexico
- Party: PAN
- Occupation: Politician

Máximo Soto Gómez (born 11 May 1949) is a Mexican politician from the National Action Party (PAN). From 2000 to 2003 he served as a federal deputy in the 58th Congress, representing the Federal District's thirteenth district for the PAN.
