= Fernando Salgado Delgado =

Mexican politician

- Born: 26 November 1966 (age 59); Cuauhtémoc, D.F., Mexico
- Occupation: Deputy
- Political party: PRI

Fernando Salgado Delgado (born 26 November 1966) is a Mexican politician affiliated with the PRI. As of 2013 he served as Deputy of the LXII Legislature of the Mexican Congress representing the State of Mexico.
