= Gamiz, Álava =

Hamlet in Álava, Spain

Gamiz
- Concejo
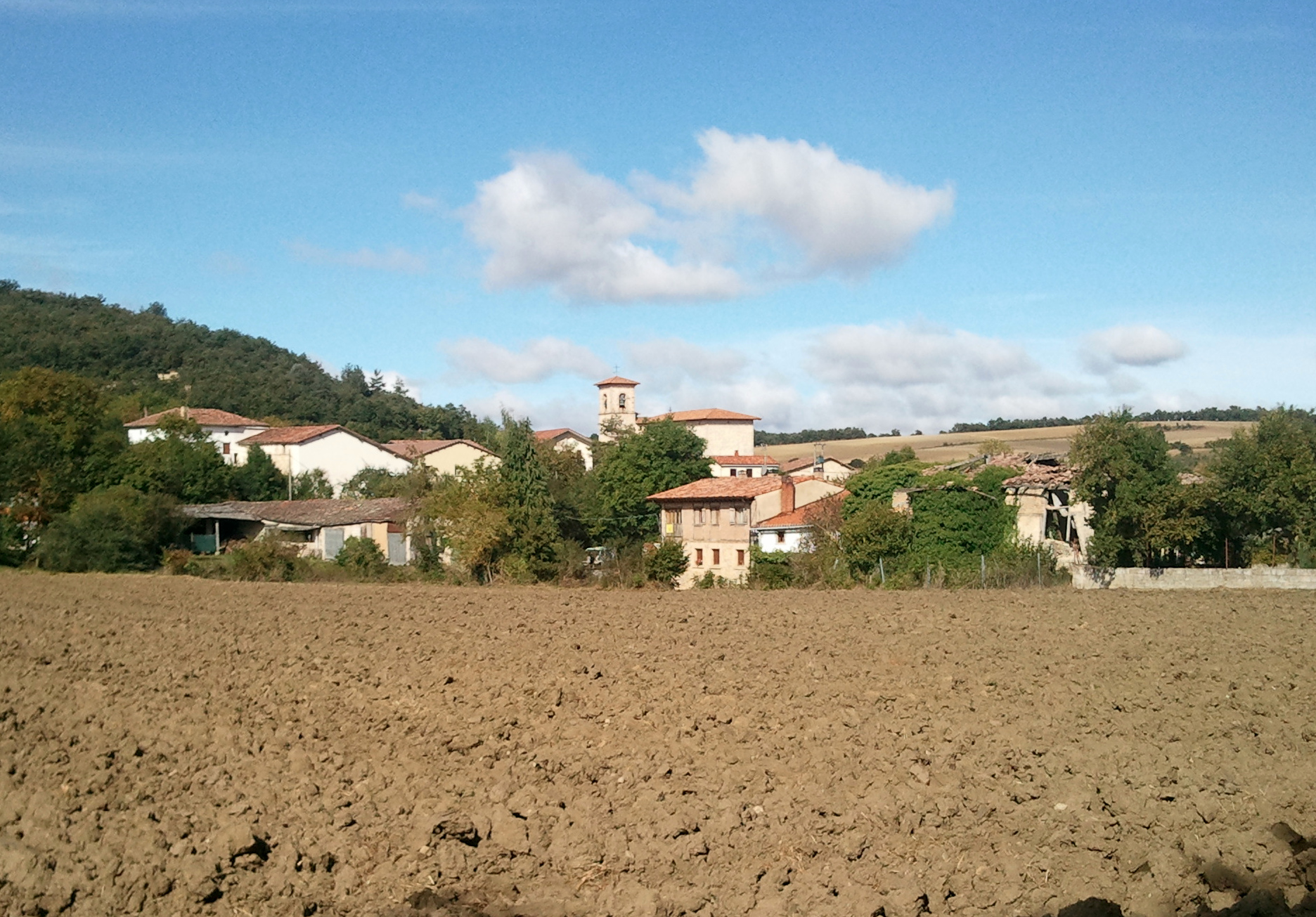
- View of Gamiz

- Location within Álava Location within the Basque Country Location within Spain
- Coordinates: 42°49′08″N 2°37′12″W
- Country: Spain
- Autonomous community: Basque Country
- Province: Álava
- Comarca: Vitoria-Gasteiz
- Municipality: Vitoria-Gasteiz

Area
  - Total: 3.54 km^{2} (1.37 sq mi)
- Elevation: 580 m (1,900 ft)

Population (2022)
  - Total: 32
  - Density: 9.0/km^{2} (23/sq mi)
- Postal code: 01194

Gamiz (Spanish: Gámiz) is a hamlet and concejo located in the municipality of Vitoria-Gasteiz, in Álava province, Basque Country, Spain.

== Sport ==
Stage 2 of the Women's 2024 Tour of the Basque Country passed through Gamiz on May 11.
