= Higinio Chávez García =

Mexican politician

- Born: 10 January 1959 (age 67); Mexico City, Mexico
- Occupation: Politician
- Political party: PRD

Higinio Chávez García (born 10 January 1959) is a Mexican politician affiliated with the Party of the Democratic Revolution (PRD). Between 2006 and 2009 he served as a federal deputy in the 60th Congress, representing the Federal District's 14th district.
