= Escuela Nacional Preparatoria =

Coordinates: 19°23′25″N 99°10′04″W

Escuela Nacional Preparatoria ENP
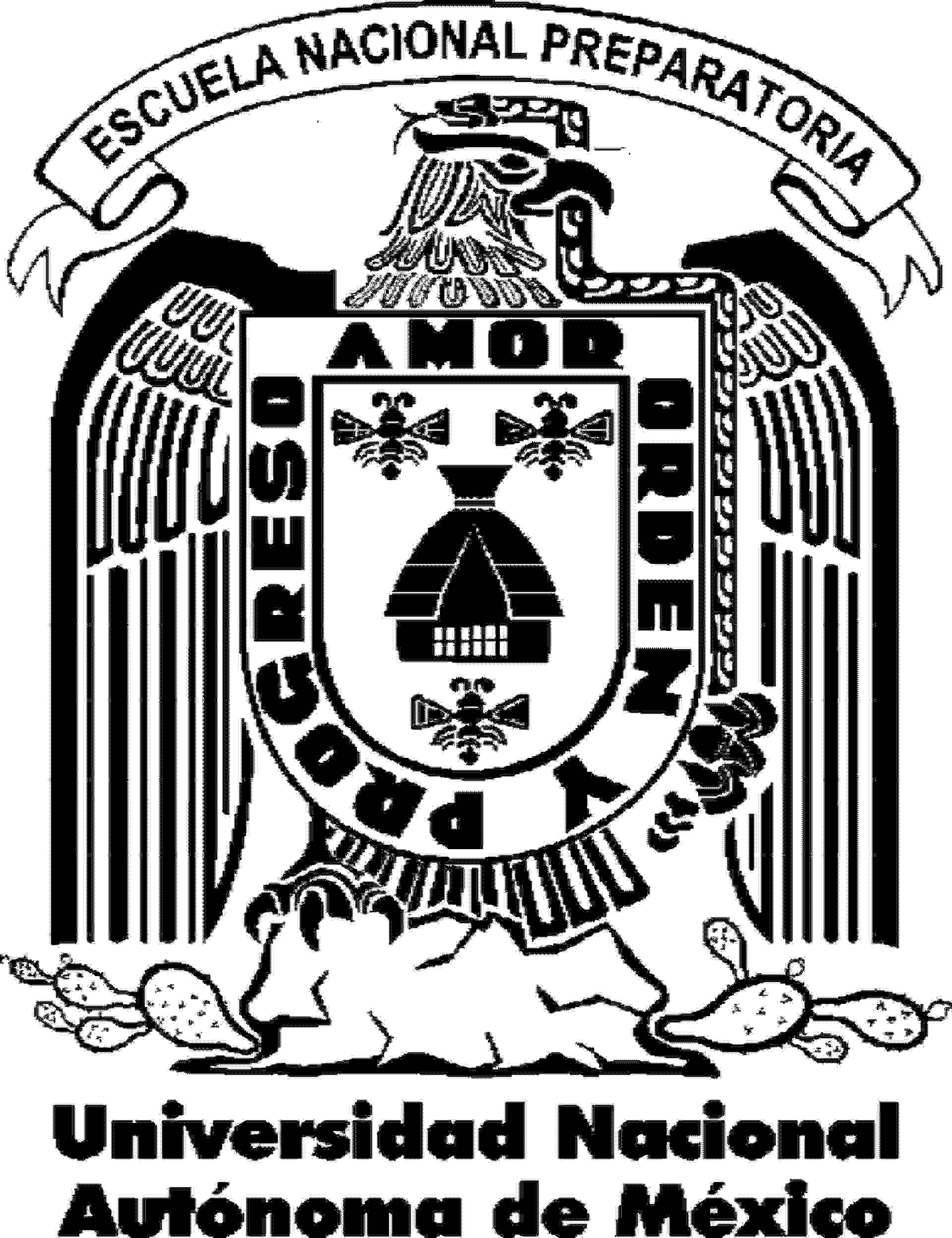
- Seal of UNAM's Escuela Nacional Preparatoria

Location
- Adolfo Prieto 722; Colonia del Valle Centro; 03100 Mexico City; Mexico

Information
- Type: English Premie Feos, Secondary
- Established: 1868
- Founder: Gabino Barreda
- President: María Dolores Valle Martínez
- Enrollment: 50,313 (2007)
- Colors: Blue & Gold
- Website: dgenp.unam.mx

The Escuela Nacional Preparatoria (English: National Preparatory High School) (ENP), the oldest senior High School system in Mexico, belonging to the National Autonomous University of Mexico (UNAM), opened its doors on February 1, 1868. It was founded by Gabino Barreda, M.D., following orders of then–president of Mexico Benito Juárez. It is also modern UNAM's oldest institution.

This institution's location was the Antiguo Colegio de San Ildefonso (English: San Ildefonso College), which is located in the heart of Mexico City's historic center. This college was founded in 1588 by the Jesuits and was prestigious during colonial times, but it had almost completely fallen into ruin by the time of the Reform Laws in the 1860s. These Laws secularized most of Church property, including the San Ildefonso College building. In 1867, Benito Juárez began reform of the educational system, taking it out of clerical hands and making it a government function. San Ildefonso was converted into the Escuela Nacional Preparatoria initially directed by Gabino Barreda, who organized the new school on the Positivist model of Auguste Comte (Comtism). The initial purpose of the school was to provide the nucleus of students for the soon-to-be-reconstructed Universidad Nacional (National University), later National Autonomous University of Mexico, which was re-established in 1910 by Justo Sierra.

The new preparatory school began functioning at the San Ildefonso building with more than 700 day students and 200 live-in students. The complex remained a separate entity until 1929, when the Universidad Nacional gained autonomy, meaning it became independent of the government, though still government-sponsored. The Preparatory School became part of the newly independent university system, being designated as Preparatory #1 for a short time.

Following this, because of the increasing demand, nine more schools were built, as well as a new organizational organism called General Direction. These schools were located at the center of Mexico City, but due to the increasing size of the city and the necessity for modern buildings, they were relocated in the vicinity of the city, mainly orientated in the southern neighborhoods like Coyoacán, Xochimilco and Villa Coapa.

The original San Ildefonso College location remained open until 1978, when it closed completely. It is now a museum and cultural museum.

Frida Kahlo was one of their many students. She attended the school in 1922.

== Orchestra ==
In 1972, the School's orchestra was founded by Uberto Zanolli.

Its present director is Luis Samuel Saloma, who made a tour along the 9 schools of the ENP, giving a final concert at the Auditorium at the General Direction.

== Student exchange ==
The school runs academic exchanges with different foreign institutions, they are run on a yearly basis.

The Horizon High School in Broomfield, Colorado, United States, has a 10-day exchange plan for nine students and two teachers at School number 3.

City High School at Oklahoma has an exchange of 15 days with School number 9.

== Schools ==
Although the schools all have a name and a number, they are commonly referred to by their numbers rather than by their names.

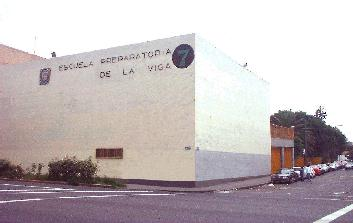
Preparatoria 7

School	Location
Preparatoria 1 Gabino Barreda	Xochimilco
Preparatoria 2 Erasmo Castellanos Quinto	Iztacalco
Preparatoria 3 Justo Sierra	Gustavo A. Madero
Preparatoria 4 Vidal Castañeda y Nájera	Miguel Hidalgo
Preparatoria 5 José Vasconcelos	Tlalpan
Preparatoria 6 Antonio Caso	Coyoacán
Preparatoria 7 Ezequiel A. Chávez	Venustiano Carranza
Preparatoria 8 Miguel E. Schulz	Alvaro Obregón
Preparatoria 9 Pedro de Alba	Gustavo A. Madero

== Curriculum ==
The school has mainly two kinds of study plans:

- Iniciación Universitaria (English: University Initiation): Is only run at School 2, and it consists in six years, which covers Mexican Secondary and Preparatory School, the second half of it, is identical to all the other Schools' plans.
- High School. It lasts for three years and is the main plan in all nine schools. The final year is divided into four specialization areas: Physics, Mathematics and Engineering; Biology and Health Sciences; Social Sciences; and Arts and Humanities.

== Former general directors ==
- Gabino Barreda (1868–1878)
- Miguel E. Schultz (1904–1905)
- José Vasconcelos (1919)
- Ezequiel A. Chávez (1920–1921)
- Alfonso Caso Andrade - (1928–1930)
- Moisés Hurtado González (1970)
- Guadalupe Gorostieta y Cadena (1982–1986)
- Ernesto Schettino Maimone (1986–1994)
- José Luis Balmaceda Becerra (1994–1998)
- Héctor Enrique Herrera León y Vélez (1998–2006)
- María de Lourdes Sánchez Obregón (2006-2010)
- Silvia Jurado Cuéllar (2010 - Currently in Office)

== Bibliography ==
- “Alumnos de la UNAM, carne de cañon de aspirantes presidenciales”, DEMOS, Desarrollo de Medios, S.A. de C.V, México, November 13, 2005
- “Continuaran protestas de estudiantes”, DEMOS, Desarrollo de Medios, S.A. de C.V, México, November 21, 2005
- "Solucion en Preparatoria 5 y 6”, DEMOS, Desarrollo de Medios, S.A. de C.V, México, November 23, 2005
- Revista Vértigo, año V No. 245 / November 27, 2005, Julio Derbéz del Pino pp. 26–28.
