= Francisco Goitia light rail station =

Xochimilco Light Rail station

Francisco Goitia
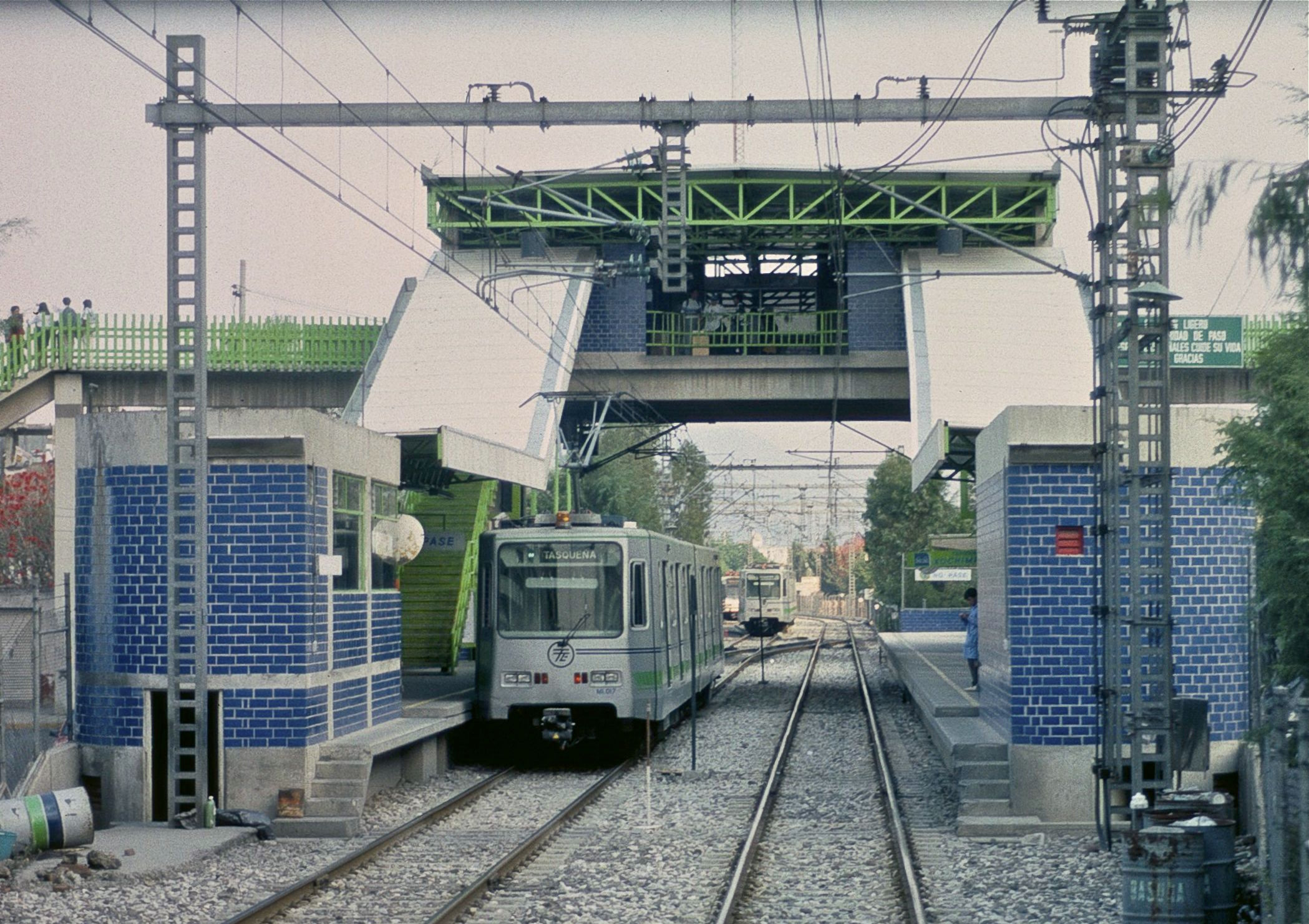
- Station

General information
- Location: Av. 20 de Noviembre, Rosas, Arroyo San Marcos y División del Norte. Col. Barrio de San Marcos. Xochimilco; Mexico
- Coordinates: 19°15′38″N 99°06′40″W
- System: Mexico City Light Rail
- Owner: Government of Mexico City
- Operator: Servicio de Transportes Eléctricos (STE)
- Platforms: 2 side platforms
- Tracks: 2

Construction
- Structure type: At-grade

History
- Opened: 1988
- Former names: Xochimilco

Services
Preceding station	STE	Following station
Huichapan toward Tasqueña	Mexico City Light Rail	Xochimilco Terminus
Route map
Location
- Location within Mexico City urban area
- Area map

Francisco Goitia is one of the stations that are part of the Mexico City Light Rail, belonging to the only existing line of the system. It is located in the south of Mexico City in the borough of Xochimilco.

== General information ==
The station was formerly known as Xochimilco, and was the terminal of the line until the opening of Embarcadero light rail station in 1995. Later, because Embarcadero was actually closer to the Xochimilco city center, Embarcadero was renamed to Xochimilco light rail station, while the original Xochimilco station was renamed Francisco Goitia. The station's current name comes from a nearby street, which was itself named after Francisco Goitia, the Zacatecan painter who lived in Xochimilco during his last years, dying in this location. The logo of this station represents a palette and brush.

== Connections ==
- CETRAM Francisco Goitia.
