= Roberto Carlos Reyes Gámiz =

Mexican politician

Carlos Reyes Gámiz

Federal Deputy in the 62nd Legislature
- In office 1 September 2012 – 31 August 2015

Personal details
- Born: 25 September 1969 (age 56) Mexico City
- Party: PES
- Occupation: Politician

Carlos Reyes Gámiz (born 25 September 1969) is a Mexican politician. He served as a federal deputy in the 62nd Legislature, representing the Federal District's 13th district for the Party of the Democratic Revolution (PRD), and in 2006 he was the candidate of the Solidarity Encounter Party for mayor of Miguel Hidalgo, Mexico City.

== Career ==
- Subdelegate for Social Development in Miguel Hidalgo (1998–2000)
- Third Local Deputy, Legislative Assembly of the Federal District (2003–2006)
- Mayoral candidate in Miguel Hidalgo (2006)
- General Secretary of the Party of the Democratic Revolution in the Federal District (2007–2008)
- Coordinator of Metropolitan Affairs (2008)
- Advisor to the Head of Delegation in Iztacalco (2010)
- Federal Deputy in the 62nd Legislature (2012–2015)
- General Director of Revenue of the State of Michoacán (2016–2018)
- Director for Planning and Innovation (2018–2020)
