= Trajinera =

Type of boat

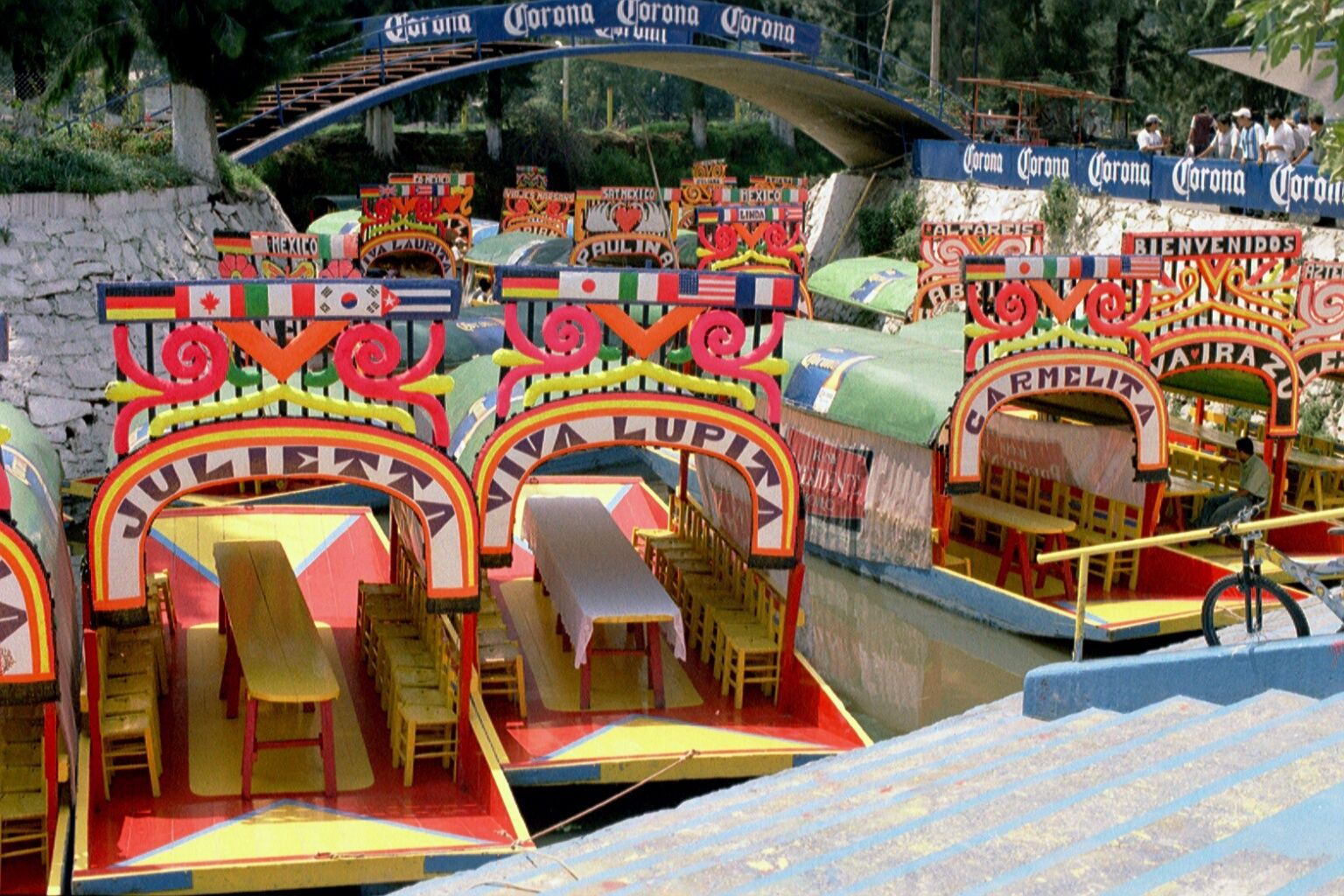
Trajineras in Xochimilco

A trajinera (Spanish: [tɾaxiˈneɾa]) is a traditional, flat-bottomed wooden rowing boat, suited to the conditions of Lake Xochimilco, in the borough of Xochimilco, Mexico City, Mexico. It is propelled by a rower, who uses an oar. The boat was originally used as a means of transportation across the lake. During the 20th and 21st centuries, trajineras have been used primarily for tourism rentals, with designs featuring colorful decorations and names, often women's names, displayed on their canopies. Travelers can listen to live Mariachi music or eat and drink while navigating the canals.

== See also ==
- Island of the Dolls, found within the lake
