= Light rail in Greater Mexico City =

Light rail lines in the Mexico City metropolitan area

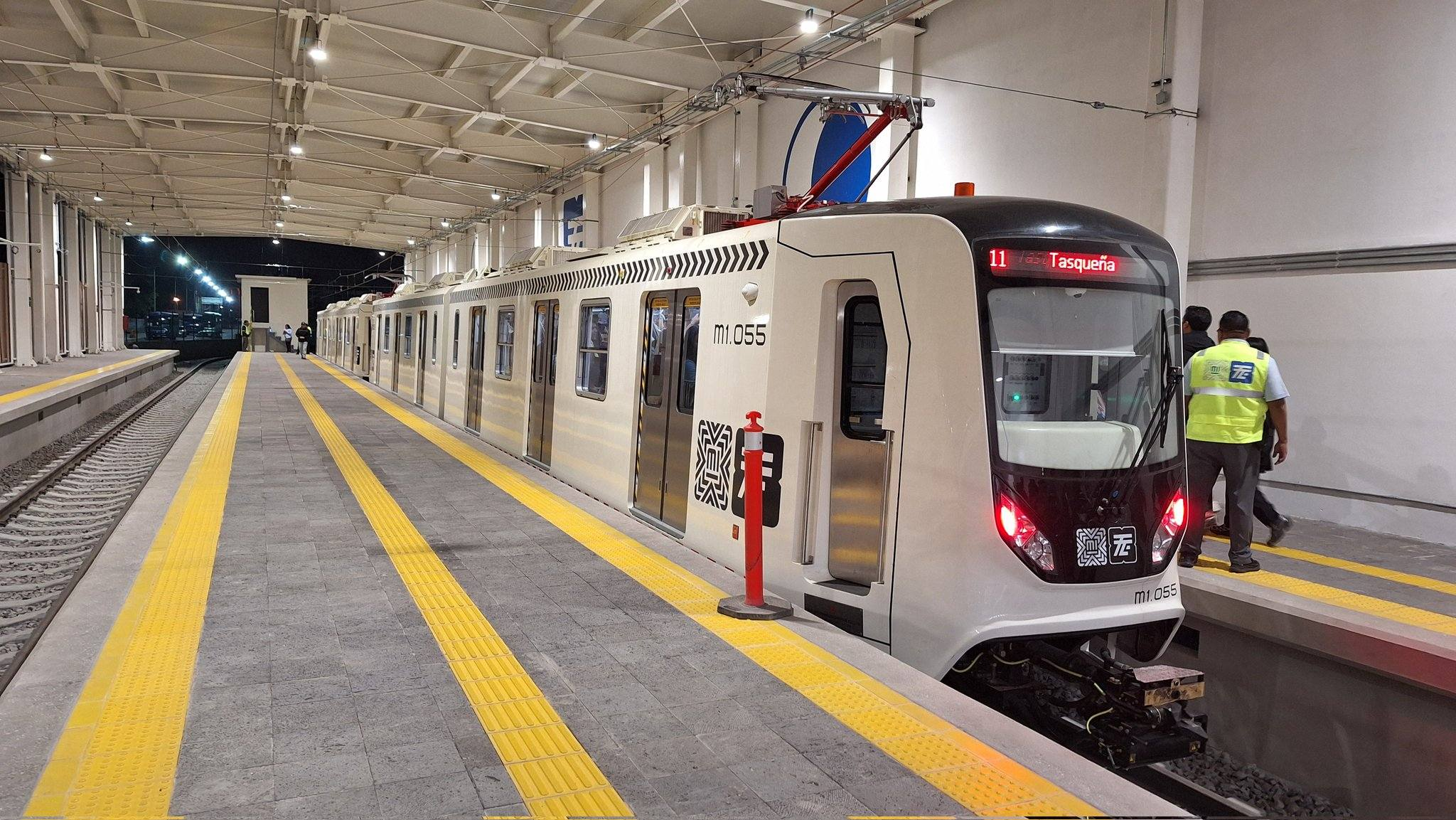
A Mexico City Light Rail train at Tasqueña

Line 1 of the Mexico City Light Rail (green) and the proposed Río Hondo–Buenavista (blue) and Texcoco–La Paz (red) lines; the Río Hondo–Buenavista alignment is approximate

Greater Mexico City has one light rail line, the Mexico City Light Rail in the south of the city running between Tasqueña and Xochimilco, run by the city since the mid-1980s. The State of Mexico (Edomex) is planning two more in the metropolitan area: Texcoco–La Paz in the east, and Río Hondo–Buenavista in the northwest, running from Naucalpan to Mexico City's central station, Buenavista. The three lines will not connect.

== Mexico City Light Rail ==
The Mexico City Light Rail, also called the Xochimilco Light Rail or Tren Ligero, is part of the Servicio de Transportes Eléctricos (STE) network. In the mid-1980s the old Xochimilco tram line was rebuilt as light rail; it is also known as Line 1 (Línea 1). The line runs south from Tasqueña, the end of Metro Line 2, to Xochimilco. There are 18 stations along a little over 13 km (8 mi) of track, in the boroughs of Coyoacán, Tlalpan and Xochimilco. In May 2026 it reopened after renovation and is now officially known as Tren El Ajolote ("the axolotl").

== Planned lines ==
=== Texcoco–La Paz ===
Texcoco–La Paz Light Rail

Overview
- Status: Proposed
- Owner: Government of the State of Mexico
- Locale: State of Mexico, Mexico
- Termini: Texcoco; La Paz
- Stations: 12

Service
- Type: Light rail
- Operator: SEMOV
- Ridership: 130,000 per day (projected)

Technical
- Line length: 21 km (13.0 mi)
- Character: Segregated right-of-way
- Operating speed: 80 km/h (50 mph) (max); 41 km/h (25 mph) (average)

Texcoco–La Paz is a project of Edomex's mobility secretariat (Semov). It will be 21 kilometres (13 mi) long, with 12 stations from Texcoco, in the far northeast of the metro area to La Paz, in southeast, the eastern terminal of Metro Line A. The planned stations are:

- Texcoco
- Autónoma de Chapingo (Chapingo Autonomous University)
- San Bernardino
- Centro Cultural Bicentenario (Centro Cultural Mexiquense Bicentenario)
- Puerta Texcoco (at/near the shopping center at 19.4265584°N 98.9141748°W)
- Central de Abasto
- Piedras Negras
- Francisco Villa
- Conalep Los Reyes (near 19.3854579°N 98.9379656°W)
- La Magdalena
- Los Reyes
- La Paz

The line will be mixed-use; in other words, freight trains will share the track. The state's 2026 budget budgeted 2.6 billion pesos (around 140 million USD) for the project. As of July 2026, construction was to begin by the end of the year and finish in 2027.

=== Río Hondo–Buenavista ===
Río Hondo–Buenavista Light Rail

Overview
- Status: Proposed
- Owner: Government of the State of Mexico; Mexico City Government
- Locale: Naucalpan, State of Mexico; Mexico City
- Termini: San José Río Hondo; Buenavista

Service
- Type: Light rail
- Ridership: 192,000 per day (projected)

Technical
- Line length: 14.6 km (9.1 mi)
- Character: Former freight right-of-way (Ferromex Line N)
- Track gauge: 1,435 mm (4 ft 8 1/2 in) standard gauge

Río Hondo–Buenavista is a second State of Mexico project, together with the state's municipality of Naucalpan. It would reuse an old railway corridor from San José Río Hondo, in Naucalpan, via downtown Naucalpan to Buenavista station, Mexico City's central station, with connections there to the Tren Suburbano serving AIFA airport and Cuauhtitlán in the far north. First estimates put the line at 14.6 km (9.1 mi) in length, of which 7.4 km in the State of Mexico and 7.2 km in Mexico City itself. Later reports say it could be as long as 20 km (12 mi). In Naucalpan there would be stops at Río Hondo, El Molinito, Naucalpan Centro-Conde and Ahuizotla. In Mexico City it would cross the boroughs of Azcapotzalco, Miguel Hidalgo and Cuauhtémoc. The estimated cost is around 15.2 billion pesos (about 810 million USD), to serve an estimated 192,000 passengers a day. There have been talks with Alstom and Stadler about the technology. As of October 2026, the project was still in technical and financial studies, with no start date for construction.

=== Other proposals ===
In 2024 the State also floated an idea for a line from Politécnico in northern Mexico City westward (and slightly northward) to Tlalnepantla and Atizapán, but only after a survey to see if it was feasible.

== Fare integration ==
In 2024 one of the commitments of Edomex's Plan Colibrí was an agreement on a single payment method, branding and operation for the integrated mobility network across the metropolitan area. That April, Mexico City's Integrated Mobility (Movilidad Integrada) card, which is also used on the light rail, was opened up to Edomex's Mexibús. In June Edomex announced its own card, Movimex, which was also to work on the Mexico City Metro, Metrobús and Cablebús.

== See also ==
- Transportation in Mexico City
- Light rail in North America
