= Ciudad Jardín =

Ciudad Jardín (Garden City) may refer to:

- Ciudad Jardín, Cali, Colombia
- Ciudad Jardín (Madrid), Spain
- Ciudad Jardín (Málaga), Spain
- Ciudad Jardín El Libertador, Buenos Aires, Argentina
- Ciudad Jardín Lomas del Palomar, Buenos Aires, Argentina
- Ciudad Jardín Bicentenario, a sports and shopping complex in Ciudad Nezahualcóyotl, Mexico
- Ciudad Jardín light rail station, a railway station in Mexico City, Mexico
