= Las Torres light rail station =

Xochimilco Light Rail station

Las Torres
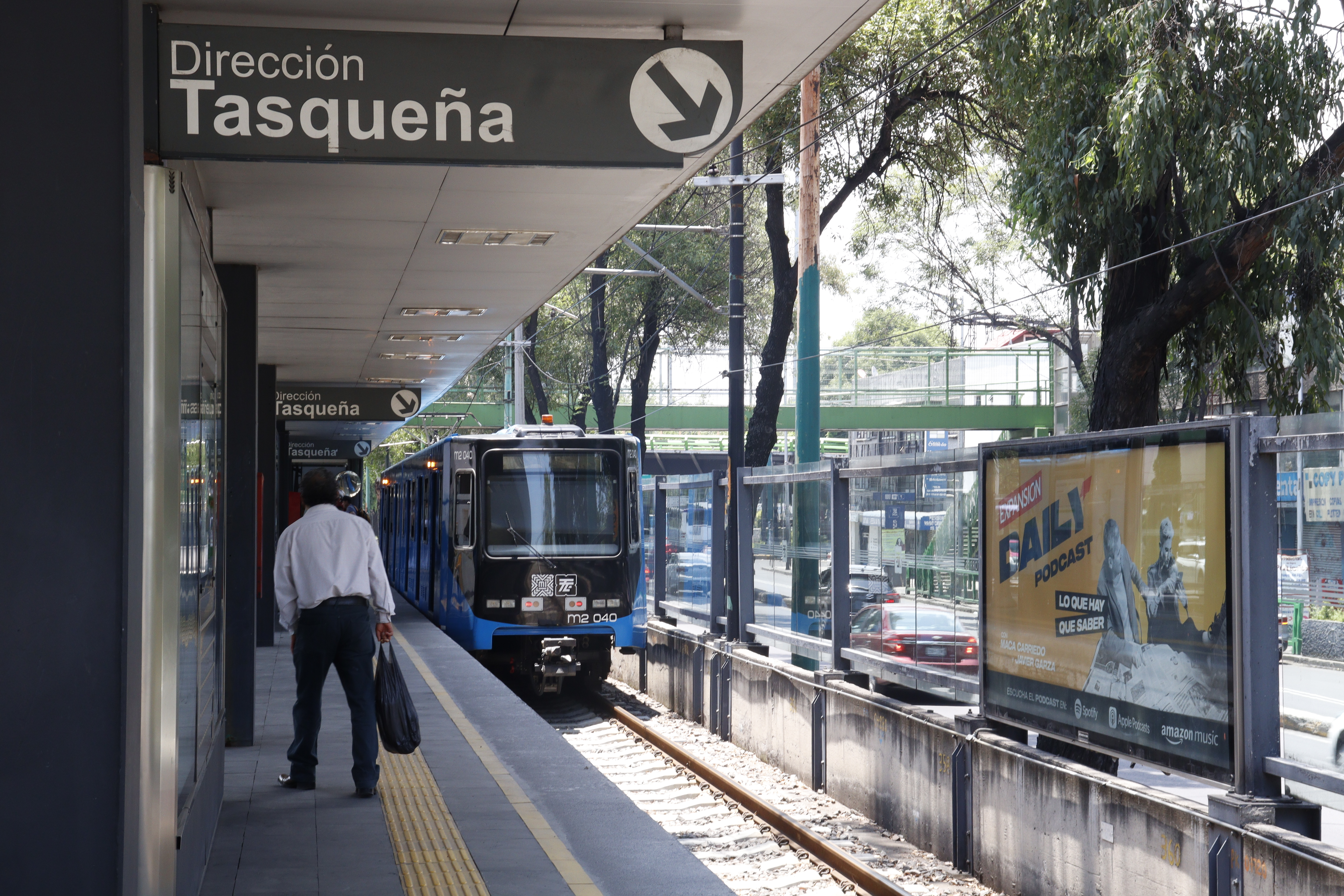

General information
- Location: Calzada de Tlalpan, Cerro de las Torres y Miguel Ángel de Quevedo. Col. Atlántida; Mexico City; Mexico
- Coordinates: 19°20′27″N 99°08′36″W
- System: Mexico City Light Rail
- Owner: Government of Mexico City
- Operator: Servicio de Transportes Eléctricos (STE)
- Platforms: 1 island platform
- Tracks: 2

Construction
- Structure type: At-grade

History
- Opened: 1 August 1986

Services
Preceding station	STE	Following station
Tasqueña Terminus	Mexico City Light Rail	Ciudad Jardín toward Xochimilco
Route map
Location
- Location within Mexico City
- Area map

Las Torres light rail station is one of the stations on the Mexico City Light Rail in Mexico City. Managed by the Servicio de Transportes Eléctricos, it is located between Tasqueña and Ciudad Jardín stations.

It was inaugurated on August 1, 1986. It is named after the nearby Avenida de Las Torres, itself named after the high-voltage towers on that street (hence why the station's logo features a high-voltage tower). It serves the Atlántida neighborhood, located in Coyoacán.
