= La Virgen light rail station =

Xochimilco Light Rail station

La Virgen
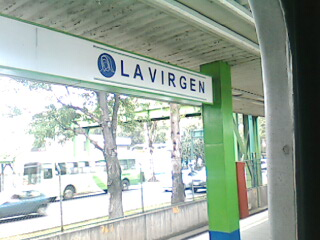

General information
- Location: Calzada de Tlalpan, Bugambilias y Calzada de la Virgen. Mexico City; Mexico
- Coordinates: 19°19′54″N 99°08′26″W
- System: Mexico City Light Rail
- Owner: Government of Mexico City
- Operator: Servicio de Transportes Eléctricos (STE)
- Platforms: 1 island platform
- Tracks: 2

Construction
- Structure type: At-grade

History
- Opened: 1 August 1986

Services
Preceding station	STE	Following station
Ciudad Jardín toward Tasqueña	Mexico City Light Rail	Xotepingo toward Xochimilco
Route map
Location
- Location within Mexico City
- Area map

La Virgen light rail station is a station on the Mexico City Light Rail in Mexico City. Managed by the Servicio de Transportes Eléctricos, it is located between Ciudad Jardín and Xotepingo stations.

It was inaugurated on August 1, 1986. It is located at the intersection of the Tlalpan Road with Bugambilias and Calzada de la Virgen. It serves the neighborhood of Xotepingo, located in Coyoacán.
