= Bombardier Transportation México =

Bombardier Transportation Mexico
- Formerly: Concarril
- Founded: April 14, 1952 (as Concarril)
- Defunct: 1992
- Successor: Bombardier-Concarril SA de CV and (later) Bombardier Transportation México
- Headquarters: Ciudad Sahagún, Mexico
- Products: Rolling stock, including freight cars, locomotives and passenger rail cars (including subway/metro cars and light rail vehicles)
- Number of employees: 3,000 (1991)

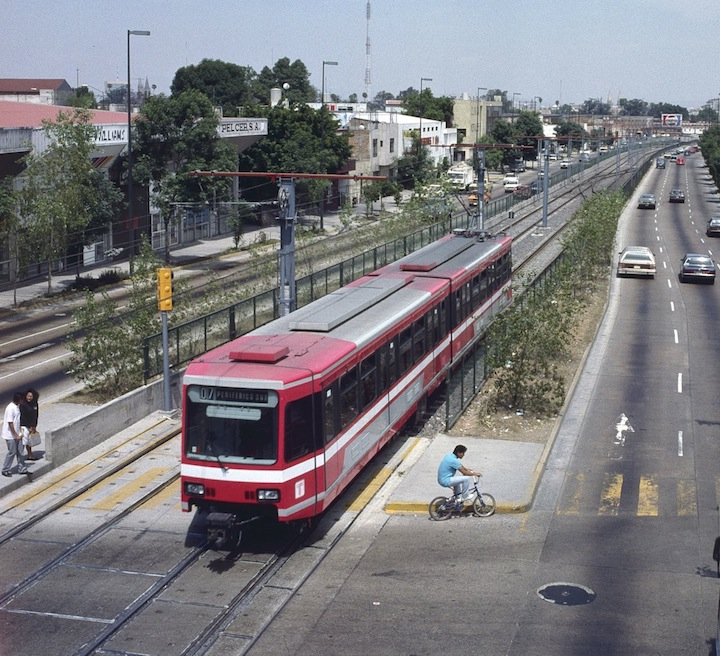
A Concarril-built light rail car on the Guadalajara light rail system in 1990.

Bombardier Transportation México is a subsidiary company of Bombardier Transportation located in Ciudad Sahagún, Mexico.

Formed in 1952 (some sources say 1954), with the name Constructora Nacional de Carros de Ferrocarril SA (English: National Railway Car Manufacturing Company), known as Concarril, or less commonly as CNCF, it was a government-owned major rail vehicle manufacturer. From the 1950s through 1991, it manufactured a wide variety of passenger and freight cars, as well as locomotives. It was owned by the Mexican government. After accumulating too much debt, it ceased operating in December 1991 and was sold to Bombardier Transportation in April 1992 for around US$68 million. At that time, it was the largest manufacturer of railway rolling stock in Mexico. Becoming a subsidiary of Bombardier, it took the name Bombardier-Concarril SA de CV, and production resumed at the Ciudad Sahagún facilities. In 2004, the company was renamed Bombardier Transportation México.

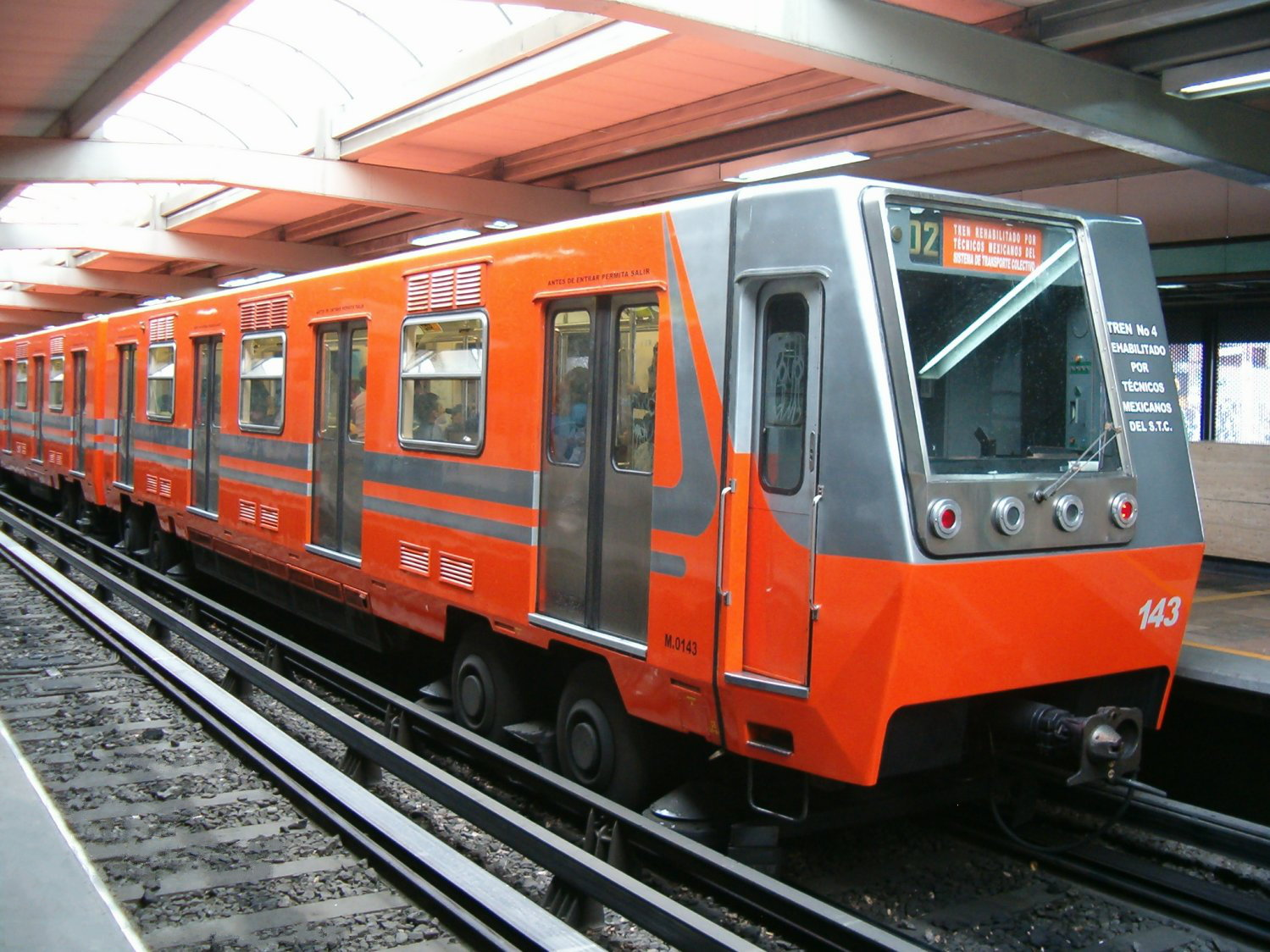
Refurbished rubber-tired train of the Mexico City Metro, of type NM-73, built by Concarril

== Concarril history ==
Constructora Nacional de Carros de Ferrocarril SA (English: National Railway Car Manufacturing Company), more commonly known as Concarril, was established in 1952 (some sources say 1954), as a rail vehicle manufacturer owned by the Mexican government. It manufactured a wide variety of passenger and freight cars, as well as locomotives.

The Ferrocarriles Nacionales de México (FNM, or NdeM), the country's government-owned railroad company until the 1990s, purchased large numbers of railroad cars from Concarril, including various freight and passenger cars. The latter included sleeping cars in addition to conventional coaches. Dining cars were not one of its regular products; it built its first such car in 1989, for FNM. The company also built locomotives for FNM and other railroads, and undertook rebuilding (or refurbishment) work on older locomotives and coaches.

Passenger railway cars built by Concarril for urban rail transit use included subway/metro cars for the Mexico City Metro and light rail vehicles (LRVs) for the Guadalajara light rail system, the Monterrey Metro and the Xochimilco Light Rail line of Mexico City's STE. The company made both steel-wheeled and rubber-tired subway cars for Mexico City. It also supplied subway cars to the Santiago Metro, in Chile (specifically the NS-88 trainset as a replacement for an NS-74 train that was destroyed during a terrorist attack in 1986); that was part of an effort by the Mexican government in 1990 to boost exports of manufactured goods, which also encompassed a planned sale of 200 Concarril-built freight cars to Venezuela.

At the time of its sale in 1992 to Bombardier Transportation, Concarril was the largest manufacturer of railway rolling stock in Mexico.

== Post-privitazation ==
In spring 1992, Concarril was acquired from the Mexican government by Bombardier of Canada, becoming part of Bombardier Transportation, as a subsidiary named Bombardier-Concarril SA. Production resumed later the same year. For some types of vehicles, Bombardier initially maintained use of the same designs as had been used by Concarril, such as for light rail cars for the Monterrey Metro, where a batch of 23 built in 1990 by Concarril and a batch of 25 built in 1992–93 by Bombardier were described by one writer as being "almost identical".

In 1998, the Greenbrier Companies, of Lake Oswego, Oregon, entered into a joint venture with Bombardier to manufacture freight railroad cars at Bombardier's Ciudad Sahagún plant. The partnership was named Greenbrier-Concarril LLC, and Greenbrier subsidiary Gunderson managed the U.S. company's involvement, as Gunderson-Concarril SA de CV. Production included boxcars, flatcars and gondola cars. Production of passenger equipment and other non-freight stock continued under the name Bombardier-Concarril, which subsidiary continued to be 100% Bombardier-owned.

In December 2004, Greenbrier purchased Bombardier's 50-percent interest in Gunderson-Concarril and became sole owner of Greenbrier-Concarril LLC and Gunderson-Concarril SA, manufacturing freight cars only. Bombardier retained ownership of the factory facilities and leased them to Greenbrier/Gunderson. Production of passenger railroad equipment continued to be undertaken by Bombardier Transportation (now as subsidiary Bombardier Transportation México, formerly Bombardier-Concarril), using another part of the former-Concarril factory in Ciudad Sahagún.

=== Toronto contract ===
Bombardier won contracts for two of the largest rail vehicle contracts in North America, 204 Flexity Outlook and 182 Flexity Freedom streetcars, for the Toronto Transit Commission, and MetroLinx, a regional transit authority in the Greater Toronto Area. Bombardier split construction of these vehicles between its Ciudad Sahagún factory and one of its factories in Thunder Bay. Welding the basic chassis was to take place in the Ciudad Sahagún factory, before shipping them to its facility in Thunder Bay for final assembly.. Bombardier fell years behind in delivery of these vehicles. Reports in the Canadian press repeated claims that the workers in the Thunder Bay plant that the work done in Ciudad Sahagún was not competently performed. Bombardier tried to speed up construction by opening up an additional production line in its plant in Kingston, Ontario.

The Financial Post reported, in January 2015, that Bombardier's Thunder Bay plant blamed layoffs on Bombardier Ciudad Sahagún's delays in delivery. This in part resulted in defects to the vehicles and delays in final delivery, leading to a C$50 million lawsuit filed by the Toronto Transit Commission, the purchaser of the vehicles.

== Bombardier Ciudad Sahagún plant ==
The plant built a series of Electro-Motive Diesel locomotives. During its periods of ownership first by the government (as Concarril) and subsequently by Bombardier, the plant has built over 100 light rail vehicles for rapid transit systems in Mexico's three largest cities, Guadalajara, Monterrey, and Mexico City. The plant has built 70 percent of the rail vehicles in Mexico.

== See also ==
- Frederic Tomesco, Brendan Case (3 July 2013). "Bombardier Weighs Mexico Rail Bids as Europe Market Slows". Bloomberg News.
