= Tacubaya Railroad =

Defunct narrow gauge railway in Mexico City

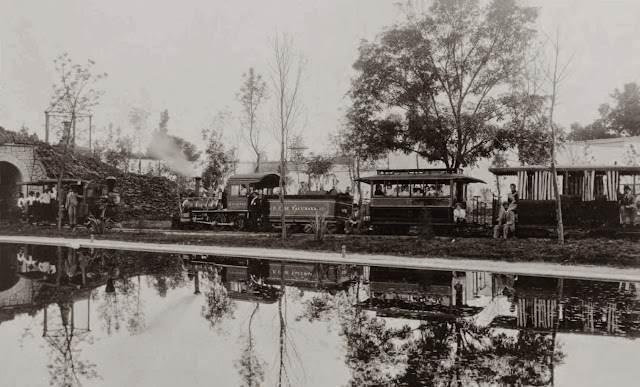
24″ gauge railway of Mr. Fernando de Teresa in Calle Gealti N° 29, in Tacubaya, Mexico City with a 5hp 0-4-0WT Arnold Jung (N° 255 of 1896), and Baldwin 4-4-0 20hp called 'Susana' (N° 15241 of March 1897)

Tacubaya Railroad (Ferrocarril de Tacubaya) was a one-mile-long (1.6 km), 600 mm (1 ft 11 5/8 in) narrow gauge line serving an amusement park in the Tacubaya district of Mexico City. The line was built by Fernando de Teresa in 1896. Passengers were carried in several designs of roofed cars approximately 5 meters (16 ft 5 in) long. The locomotives were smaller than those used at Disneyland. The first locomotive was based on Decauville equipment; and the second, a 6-ton 4-4-0, was the smallest ever built by Baldwin for commercial purposes. The line was converted to part of Mexico City's standard gauge electric tramway system in 1910.

== Locomotives ==
Number	Builder	Type	Power	Date	Works number	Notes
1	Arnold Jung (acquired via Krupp Grusonwerk, Magdeburg for Mexico)	0-4-0T	5hp	1896	255	
2	Baldwin Locomotive Works	4-4-0	20hp	1897	15241	named Susana
