= Ciudad Jardín light rail station =

Xochimilco Light Rail station

Ciudad Jardín
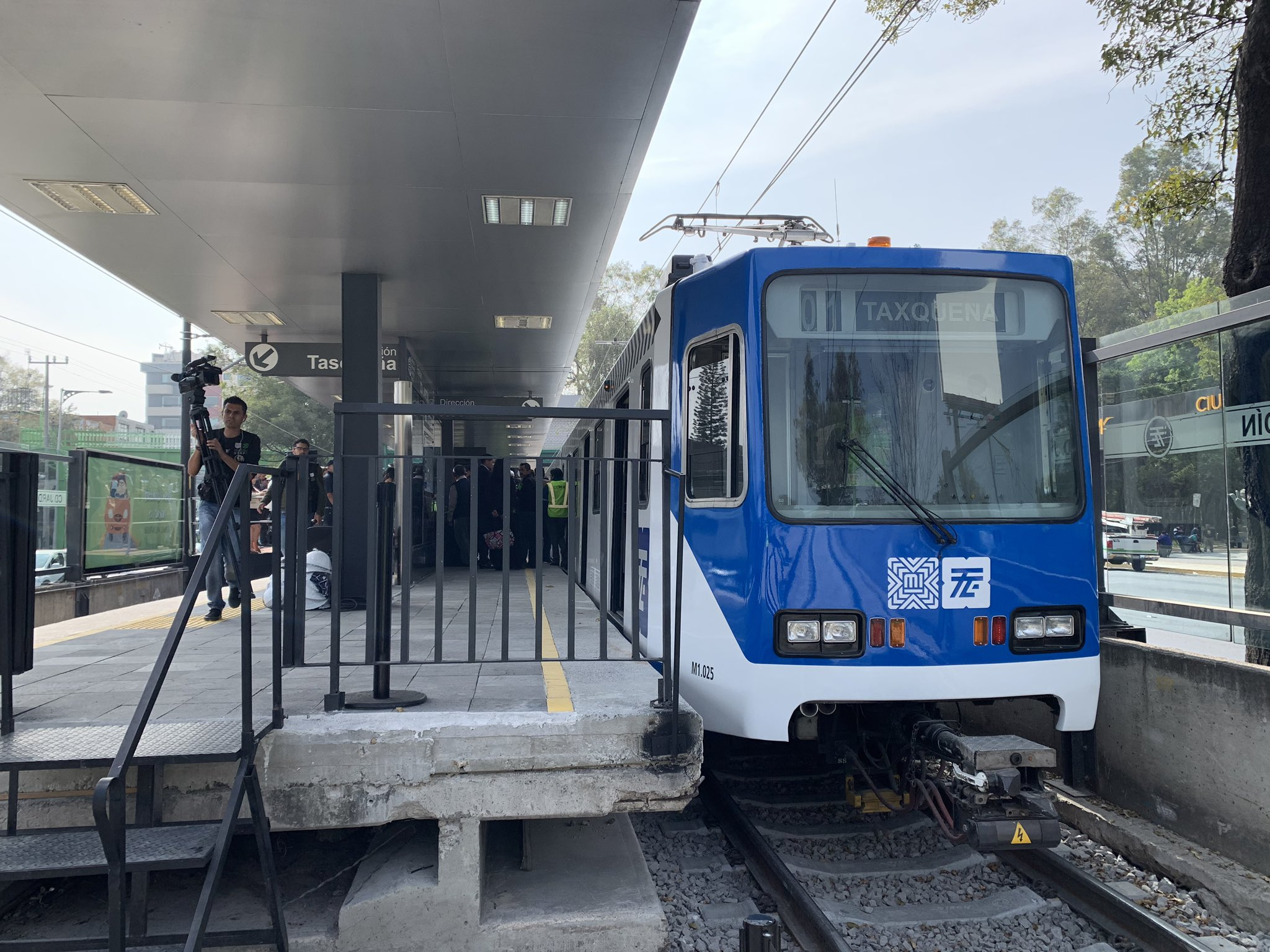

General information
- Location: Calzada de Tlalpan y Xotepingo. Col. El Centinela y Ciudad Jardín. Mexico City; Mexico
- Coordinates: 19°20′08″N 99°08′31″W
- System: Mexico City Light Rail
- Owner: Government of Mexico City
- Operator: Servicio de Transportes Eléctricos (STE)
- Platforms: 1 island platform
- Tracks: 2

Construction
- Structure type: At-grade

History
- Opened: 1 August 1986

Services
Preceding station	STE	Following station
Las Torres toward Tasqueña	Mexico City Light Rail	La Virgen toward Xochimilco
Route map
Location
- Location within Mexico City
- Area map

Ciudad Jardín light rail station is one of the stations on the Mexico City Light Rail in Mexico City. Managed by the Servicio de Transportes Eléctricos, it is located between Las Torres and La Virgen stations.

It was inaugurated on August 1, 1986. It is located at the intersection of the Calzada de Tlalpan with Xotepingo Street. It serves the neighborhoods of El Centinela and Ciudad Jardín, located in Coyoacán.
