= Mexico City Light Rail =

Light rail line in southern Mexico City

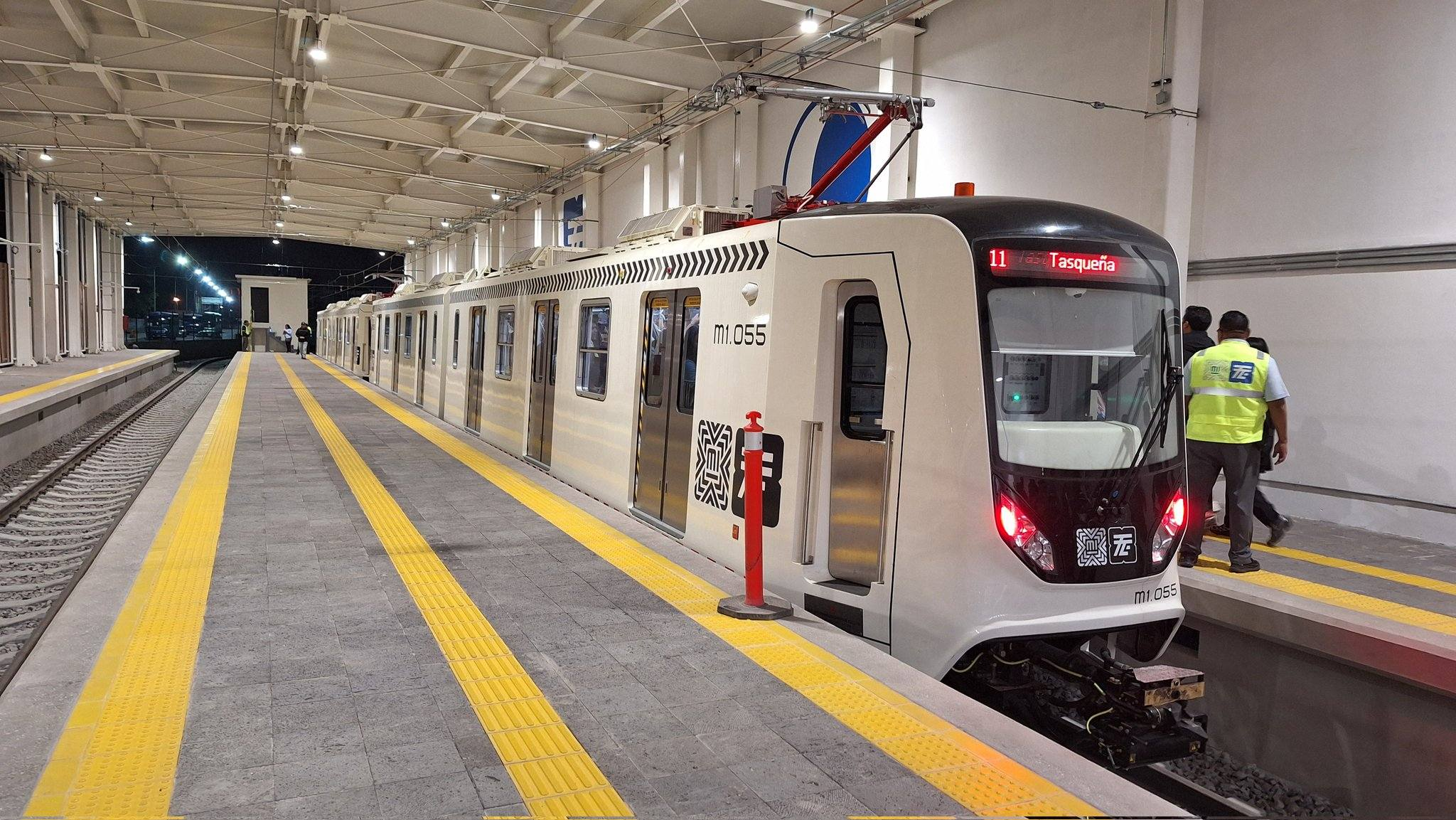
- Mexico City Light Rail train at Tasqueña station

Overview
- Status: In service
- Owner: Mexico City Government
- Locale: Mexico City
- Termini: Tasqueña; Xochimilco
- Stations: 18
- Website: Tren Ligero

Service
- Type: Light rail
- System: Mexico City Integrated Mobility System
- Operator: Servicio de Transportes Eléctricos
- Rolling stock: 24 articulated light rail cars
- Ridership: 21 million per year (2007)

History
- Opened: 1986 (reopening after upgrading from streetcar line)

Technical
- Line length: 12.8 km (8.0 mi)
- Num of tracks: 2
- Character: Street level rail line
- Track gauge: 1,435 mm (4 ft 8 1/2 in) standard gauge
- Minimum radius: 30 metres (98 ft)
- Electrification: Overhead line, 750 V DC
Route map
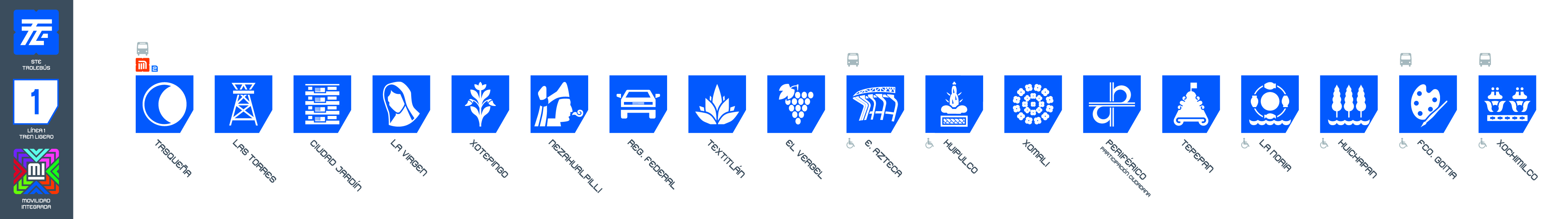

The Mexico City Light Rail, also called the Xochimilco Light Rail, is a light rail line that serves the southern part of Mexico City. It is locally known as the Tren Ligero (meaning Light Rail), and known since 2026 by the local government as the Tren El Ajolote. It is operated by Servicio de Transportes Eléctricos (STE), which also operates the trolleybus and Cablebús systems, and formerly operated the municipal electric tram system. Along with other public transportation services, including the Mexico City Metro, Tren Interurbano and Tren Suburbano rail networks, it forms part of the Mexico City Integrated Mobility System.

The State of Mexico government is planning two light rail lines of its own, which are not part of this system. One of them, Río Hondo (Naucalpan)–Buenavista, would cross part of Mexico City.

== History ==
Many of Mexico City's original tram lines were abandoned in the 1960s and 1970s. The original Xochimilco tramline had been in operation since 1910, but the Xochimilco tramway's section between Avenida Tasqueña and the city centre was replaced by a new metro line in 1970. With the subsequent Mexico City tramway closures that took effect in May 1979, the only tramlines left in operation were routes 53 and 54, running from Tasqueña metro station to Tlalpan and Xochimilco, respectively. These shared a common routing between Tasqueña and Huipulco, with the Tlalpan service branching off of the main line for only about 2 kilometres (1.2 mi) to its terminus at Avenida San Fernando, in the historic centre of Tlalpan borough. On the common section, the tracks were located in the wide median of the Calzada de Tlalpan. The tracks between Huipulco and Xochimilco were also in a separate right-of-way. The separation from street traffic, except at crossings, made routes 53 and 54 more like what later came to be called light rail unlike Mexico City's other tramlines which were closed by 1979, but these lines still lacked other light-rail attributes such a full stations. Thus the decision was made in the early 1980s to convert these lines to modern light rail transit.

Both lines ceased operation in September 1984, for rebuilding as light rail. Changes to allow faster operation included replacing the simple tram stops with semi-enclosed estaciones (stations), which were spaced farther apart, fitted with high-level boarding platforms and set up as paid areas, so that all payment of fares would take place before boarding. In between the stations the work included installing new tracks set in concrete; putting fencing along the line's right-of-way and closing some street crossings; and installing overhead catenary designed for higher speeds. The fleet of 1940s PCC streetcars was also replaced by a fleet of new articulated light rail cars built partially using components from the old cars, including their PCC bogies (trucks) and propulsion systems (see Rolling stock, below, for more details).

The 5.5-kilometre (3.4 mi) section between Tasqueña and Estadio Azteca light rail station (Banorte Stadium), just short of Huipulco junction (for the branch to Tlalpan), opened as light rail on 1 August 1986, but ran for only three days before poor reliability with the heavily rebuilt rail cars led to a decision to suspend service. Service resumed in November 1986. Right-of-way work then shifted to the line's outer section, between Estadio Banorte and Xochimilco, with similar upgrading for higher-speed operation. This section opened on 29 November 1988. The old tram line 54 had included a long loop through the historic centre of Xochimilco, along narrow city streets, but this was not included in the upgrading to light rail, and was permanently abandoned when closed in 1984.

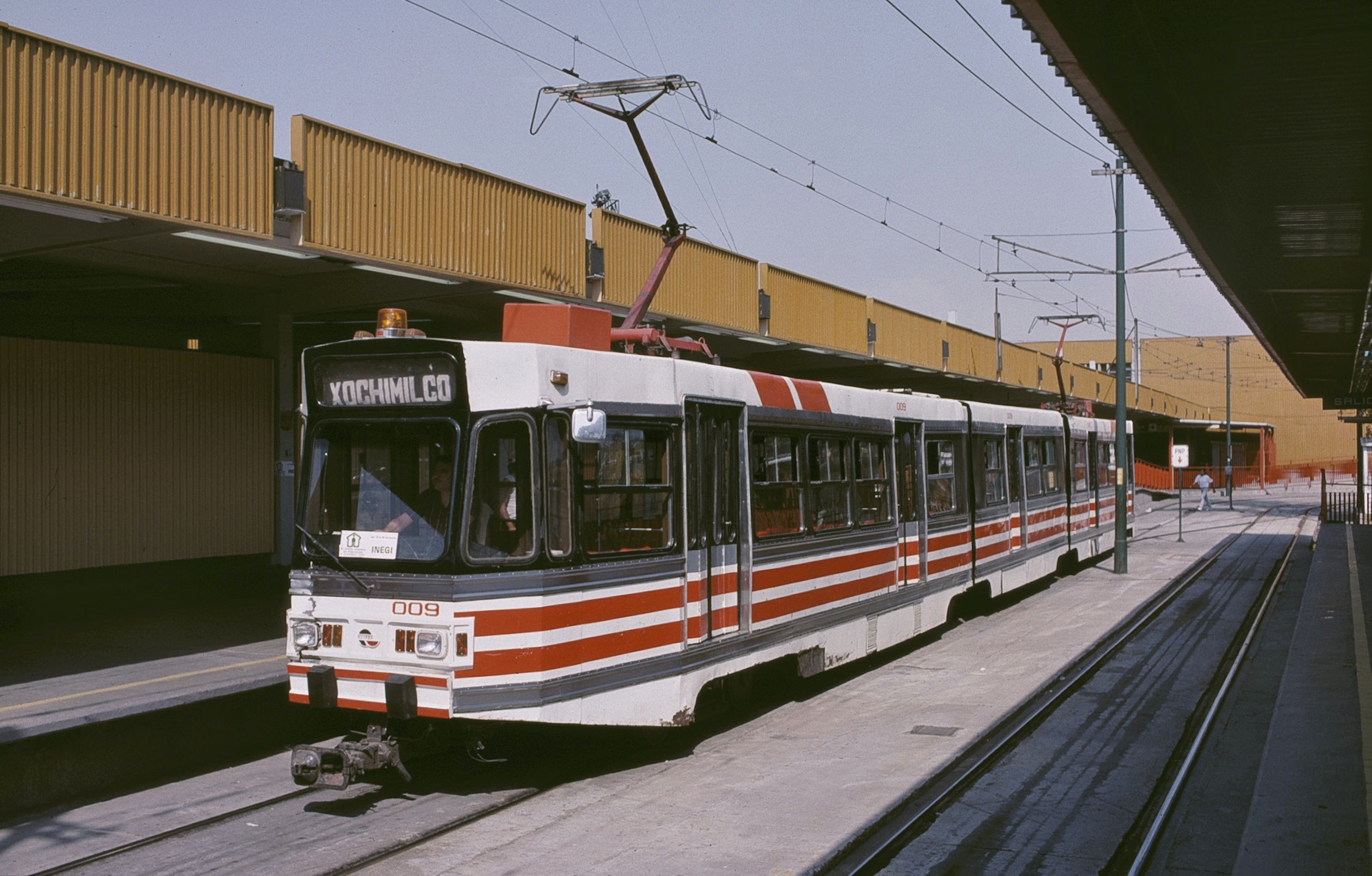
One of the Moyada-built cars that served the Tren Ligero line from 1986–91, seen at Tasqueña terminal in 1990

The 1.7-kilometre (1.1 mi) branch from Huipulco junction to Tlalpan was also rebuilt, but in a different manner, changed from private right-of-way to street running (without separation from other traffic) in the middle lanes of Calle Ferrocarril (now known as Renato Leduc) and also shortened by about 125 metres (410 ft) at its outer end, no longer reaching Avenida San Fernando. Three high-platform stops were built, one being at the new terminus, which was referred to simply as "Tlalpan" on the rail cars' destination signs. Service to Tlalpan was reintroduced on 13 March 1990, now running only as a one-car shuttle to and from Estadio Banorte, no longer through to Tasqueña. Patronage was low, and service was discontinued only one year later, in March 1991, after an accident damaged the one car (No. 000) normally assigned to the Tlalpan route. Service was reinstated on 13 December 1991, as STE began to place new cars into service on the Xochimilco line, but ceased again on 6 October 1992 and has never resumed.

The overhead line voltage was 600 volts DC until around the end of 1995, when it was raised to 750 V.

== Route ==
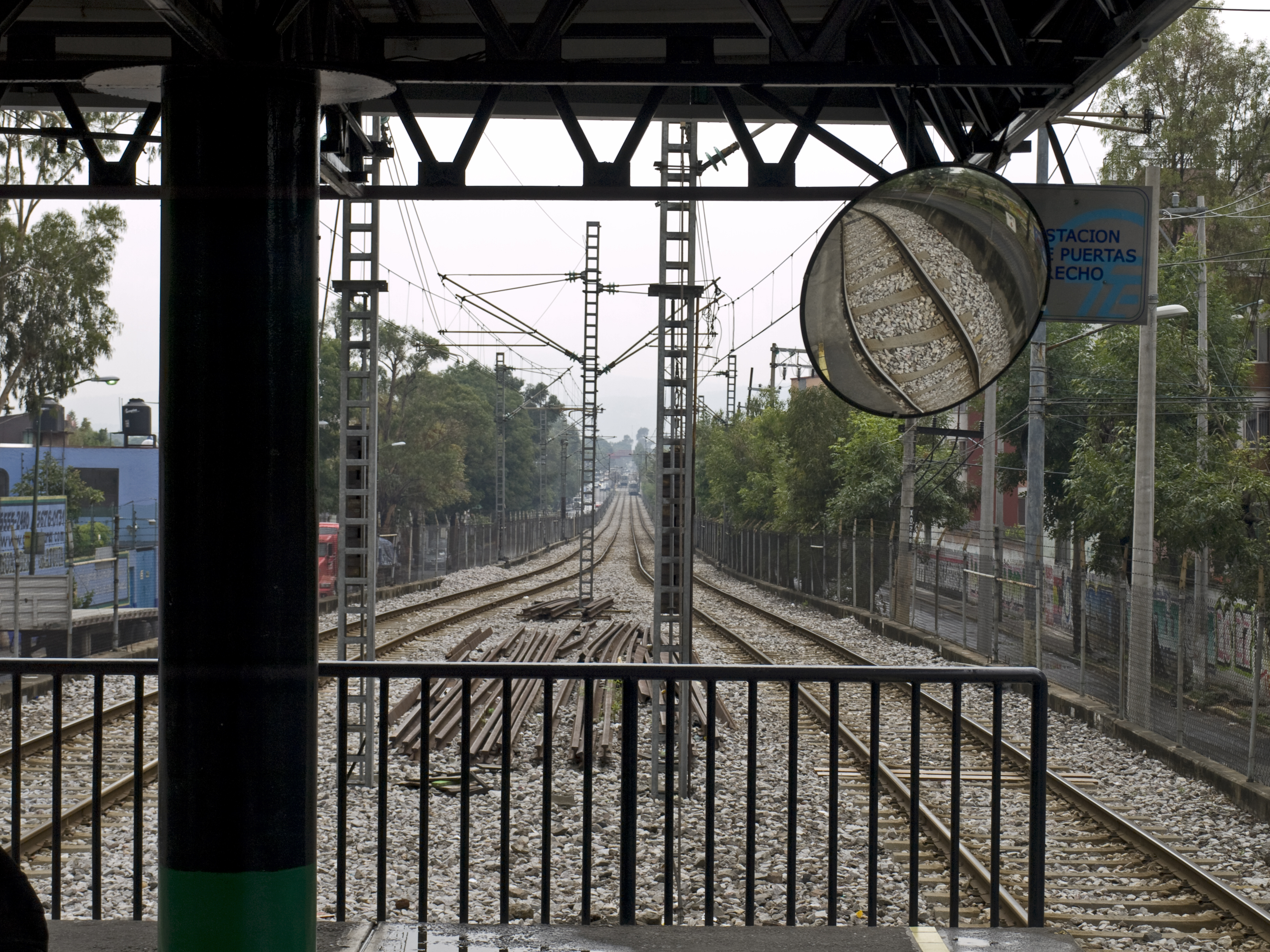
The panorama of the line between La Noria and Huichapan

The line runs between Metro Tasqueña and the town of Xochimilco, south of Mexico City. It serves the Coyoacán, Tlalpan, and Xochimilco boroughs, giving residents a fast link to the urban south of Mexico City. For the northern stretch of its run, it travels along the central reservation of the Calzada de Tlalpan, as does Metro Line 2 south of Metro San Antonio Abad – for this reason, it is sometimes seen as a continuation of that line, albeit on a more modest scale. The light rail line has 18 stations: two terminals and 16 intermediate stations. Three of these stations were built later than the others; Huipulco, Periférico and Huichapan stations opened in November 1993. The travel time from one end of the line to the other is approximately 37 minutes.

Until 1995, the outer terminus was located just beyond Calle Francisco Goitia, at what is now named Francisco Goitia station; it was named "Xochimilco" station originally. In that year, the line was extended east by about 800 metres (875 yd) to a new terminus at the western edge of Delegación Xochimilco's centre, along a section of former tram line 54, closed in 1984. This new section was opened on 14 September 1995, and the new terminus was named Embarcadero. However, as the new terminus was now located closer to the centre of Xochimilco than was the actual station bearing that name, STE eventually renamed Embarcadero station as "Xochimilco", and the original "Xochimilco" station—now the line's penultimate station—became Francisco Goitia station. However, the partly single-track segment from Francisco Goitia to Xochimilco limited capacity on the line, and so the Xochimilco station was rebuilt 200 metres (219 yd) to the west and equipped with two tracks and three loading platforms. The old Xochimilco station closed in November 2007 for the start of construction, and the new station opened on 14 December 2008.

== Rolling stock ==
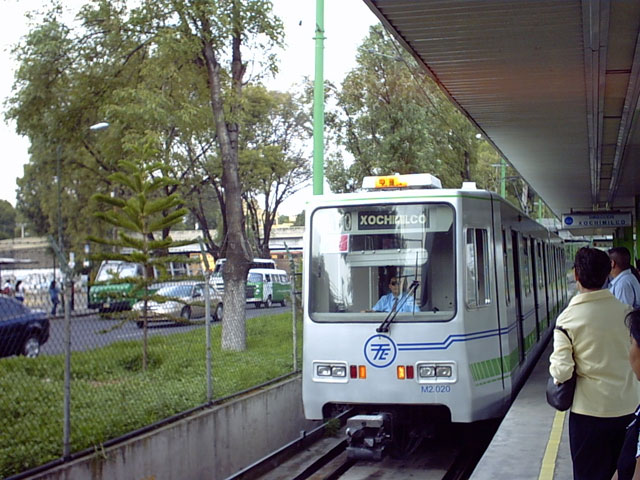
Concarril-built car number 020 approaching the platform at Estadio Banorte station

The Xochimilco line's rolling stock currently consists of 24 articulated light rail vehicles (LRVs) built by Concarril or Bombardier/Siemens, between 1990 and 2014. Each car is about 29 metres (95 ft) long and capable of carrying up to 300 passengers. The first 16 of these replaced older cars over the period 1991–95.

The line's original fleet consisted of semi-new articulated LRVs built by Moyada (Motores y Adaptaciones Automotrices, S.A.), incorporating the bogies (trucks) and some other parts from STE's large fleet of withdrawn 1940s-vintage PCC streetcars. STE originally intended to rebuild about 20 PCCs for the lines, a project well underway at STE's Tetepilco Depot when the workshop building collapsed during the 1985 Mexico City earthquake, crushing the cars. The prototype LRV was numbered 000, and the remainder 001-016. The Moyada cars had all-new bodies and were equipped with pantographs instead of trolley poles to collect current from the overhead wires. Unlike the old streetcars/trams, they were also bi-directional, having operating cabs at both ends and doors on both sides. Perhaps because of their vintage running gear or electrical components, these cars were found to be unreliable, even after the refurbishment of six in 1989–91.

In 1989, STE placed an order with Concarril for 12 all-new LRVs with similar capacity, to the same design as LRVs Concarril had recently supplied to Guadalajara's light rail system. Numbered 017–028, the order's first cars arrived in January 1991 entered service on 6 December 1991, replacing all of the Moyada cars except on the Tlalpan shuttle service. When Tlalpan service was withdrawn again in October 1992, the Moyada cars were no longer used. However, in 1992–93 three Moyada cars (005, 010 and 016) were again fitted with all-new bodies, now to a design intended to resemble the Concarril cars, this work being undertaken by local firm Sintra S.A. The three "Sintra" cars, as they were known, the fleet's last to use PCC-type control systems, entered service on 1 June 1993. They were withdrawn in late 1995, and shortly afterward the voltage of the line was raised from 600 V DC to 750 V. The newer cars had already been able to operate at the higher voltage.

Four additional LRVs of the same type as the Concarril units were purchased later, in 1995, numbered 029–032. These were built by Bombardier-Concarril S.A. de CV, a subsidiary of Bombardier, which had acquired Concarril in 1992, but were built in the same factory (in Ciudad Sahagún) and were nearly identical to STE's 12 Concarril cars. (Several years later, in 2004, Bombardier-Concarril was renamed Bombardier Transportation México.) These four cars were originally ordered by the Guadalajara light rail system, but were resold to STE after Guadalajara decided they were excess to their fleet needs at that time. In the mid-2000s, four more cars were purchased from Bombardier, numbered 033–036, and they entered service on the Xochimilco light rail line in September and October 2008, increasing the fleet size to 20 cars, numbered 017–036.

=== After 2010 ===
On 30 August 2011, on its way to Huichapan station, car 031 was hit, while coming to a stop, at full speed by car 027. Twenty-nine people were injured. The two LRVs sustained heavy damage. One half of each two-section LRV was scrapped, and in 2013 STE hired Bombardier to supply two all-new half-car sections and to combine them with the undamaged halves of the two LRVs. Cars 027 and 031 both returned to service in autumn 2014.

Meanwhile, another four new LRVs were purchased from Bombardier in 2013–14, which would be assigned STE fleet numbers 037–040. They were delivered in summer 2014 and entered service on 16 March 2015, increasing the size of the fleet to 24 cars (numbered 017–040).

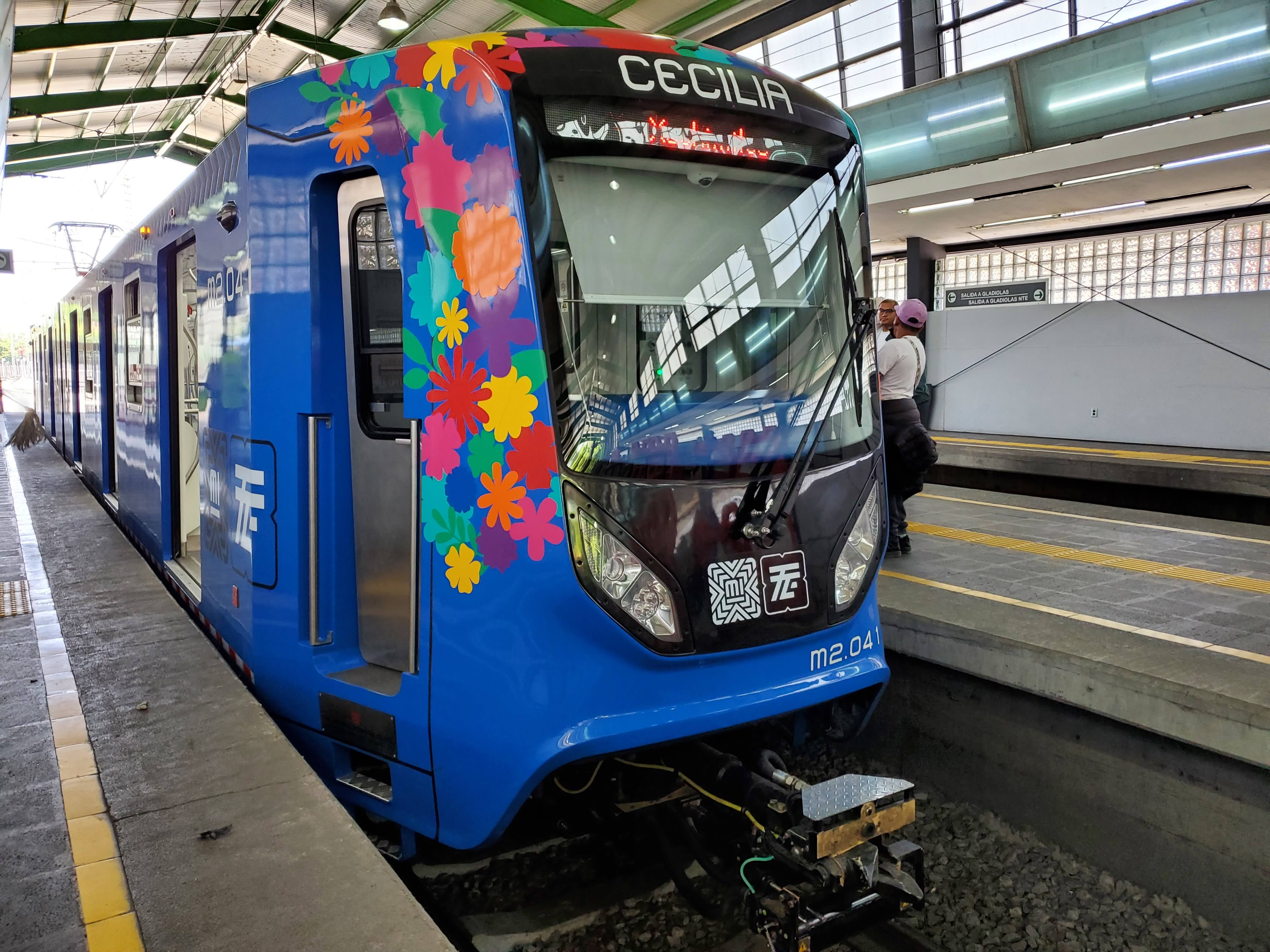
STE's first CRRC-built LRV in service in 2024

In 2022, STE placed an order with CRRC Zhuzhou Locomotive Company, of China, for six new LRVs, which was later expanded to nine cars. The first car (no. 041) was delivered in November 2023 and entered service in early January 2024. Additional cars in the series, which is numbered 041–049, began to arrive in February 2024.

All 12 Concarril LRVs (nos. 017–028) had been withdrawn by the end of 2023. Car 018 has been preserved by STE. By the end of 2024, all nine CRRC cars had entered service, and in December 2024 three Bombardier LRVs (nos. 33, 35, 36) returned to service after refurbishment. The size of the active fleet then stood at 21 cars: Bombardier 029–040 and CRRC 041–049.

== Stations ==
Key (Note: The following list was adapted from different websites and official maps.: Metro connections obtained from the official Mexico City Metro system map.; Accessibility obtained from the Mexico City Metro system map. In some cases, the map omits the accessibility icon as the station(s) are actually partially accessible. However, the respective websites of each station on the official site indicate the respective accessibility methods. Stations with the symbol are fully accessible; stations with the symbol are partially accessible.; Cablebús obtained from their official website.; Centro de transferencia modal (CETRAM;) obtained from the official website of the Órgano Regulador de Transporte.; Ecobici obtained from their official website.; Metrobús obtained from the Mexico City Metrobús system map.; Mexibús obtained from the official Mexico City Metro system map.; Mexicable obtained from the official Mexico City Metro system map.; Public buses network (peseros) obtained from the official website of the Órgano Regulador de Transporte.; Red de Transporte de Pasajeros obtained from their official website.; Trolleybuses obtained from their official website.)
Handicapped/disabled access	Fully accessible station	Cablebús Line {{{3}}}	Cablebús connection	Red de Transporte de Pasajeros	RTP connection
Handicapped/disabled access	Partially accessible station	Mexibús	Mexibús connection	Tren Interurbano	Tren Interurbano connection
Transfer hub	CETRAM transfer station	Mexicable	Mexicable connection	Tren Suburbano	Tren Suburbano connection
Transfer hub	ETRAM transfer station	Mexico City Metro	Mexico City Metro connection	Trolleybus	Trolleybus connection
Ecobici	Ecobici bikeshare	Mexico City minubus	Pesero connection	Mexico City Light Rail	Mexico City Light Rail connection

Pictogram	Station	Handicapped/disabled access	Opened	Distance (km)		Connections	Location
Pictogram	Station	Handicapped/disabled access	Opened	Between stations	Total	Connections	Location
	Tasqueña	Handicapped/disabled access	August 1986	—N/a	0.0	(at Tasqueña); 2A, 17F, 31B, 81A, 111A, 143, 145A; 2A, 2F, 5A (at distance), 17C, 17H, 17I; South Bus Terminal	Coyoacán
	Las Torres		August 1986	0.7	0.7	(at Cerro Huitzilac); 17F, 31B, 111A, 145A; 2F	Coyoacán
	Ciudad Jardín		August 1986	0.5	1.3	17F, 31B, 111A, 145A; 2F	Coyoacán
	La Virgen		August 1986	0.5	1.8	17F, 31B, 111A, 145A; 2F	Coyoacán
	Xotepingo		August 1986	0.4	2.2	17F, 31B, 111A, 145A; 2F	Coyoacán
	Nezahualpilli		August 1986	0.5	2.7	17F, 31B, 111A, 145A; 2F	Coyoacán
	Registro Federal		August 1986	0.6	3.3	17F, 31B, 111A, 145A; 2F	Coyoacán
	Textitlán		August 1986	0.6	3.9	17F, 31B, 111A, 145A; 2F	Coyoacán
	El Vergel		August 1986	0.6	4.6	17F, 31B, 111A, 145A; 2F	Coyoacán
	Estadio Azteca	Handicapped/disabled access	August 1986	0.8	5.3	17E, 17F, 31B, 69, 111A, 131, 132, 134, 134A, 134B, 134C, 134D, 145A, 162D; 2F	Coyoacán/ Tlalpan
	Huipulco	Handicapped/disabled access	August 1986	0.7	6.0	31B, 111A (at distance), 145A; 2F	Tlalpan
	Xomali	Handicapped/disabled access	August 1986	1.1	7.1	31B, 145A	Tlalpan
	Periférico/Participación Ciudadana		August 1986	1.0	8.1	31B, 57A, 57C, 145A; 1C	Tlalpan
	Tepepan		August 1986	0.8	8.9	31B, 145A	Xochimilco
	La Noria	Handicapped/disabled access	August 1986	1.6	10.5	31B, 145A	Xochimilco
	Huichapan	Handicapped/disabled access	August 1986	0.8	11.3	31B	Xochimilco
	Francisco Goitia	Handicapped/disabled access	August 1986	0.9	12.2	31B, 39B, 47A, 143	Xochimilco
	Xochimilco	Handicapped/disabled access	14 December 2008	0.8	13	142, 144, 145, 146, 147	Xochimilco

== Other light rail in Greater Mexico City ==
The State of Mexico government is planning two light rail lines. Texcoco–La Paz will run entirely within the State of Mexico, to the eastern terminus of Metro Line A at La Paz. Río Hondo–Buenavista would run from Naucalpan to Buenavista station, with about half of its length in Mexico City.

== See also ==
- Light rail in Greater Mexico City
- Light rail in North America
- List of rapid transit systems
- Transport in Mexico City
