= Ciudad Jardín, Cali =

Community in Colombia

Coordinates: 3.359418°N 76.538606°W

Ciudad Jardín is the southernmost part of Santiago de Cali in western Colombia. This community is home of some of the wealthiest living in Cali today. It contains many commercial parks such as the Jardin Plaza which is one of the largest outdoor shopping centres in Colombia. The history of the neighborhood has a dark past, when in the 1990´s some of the city's drug kingpins established their homes in it.
