= Light rail in North America =

Mode of public transit

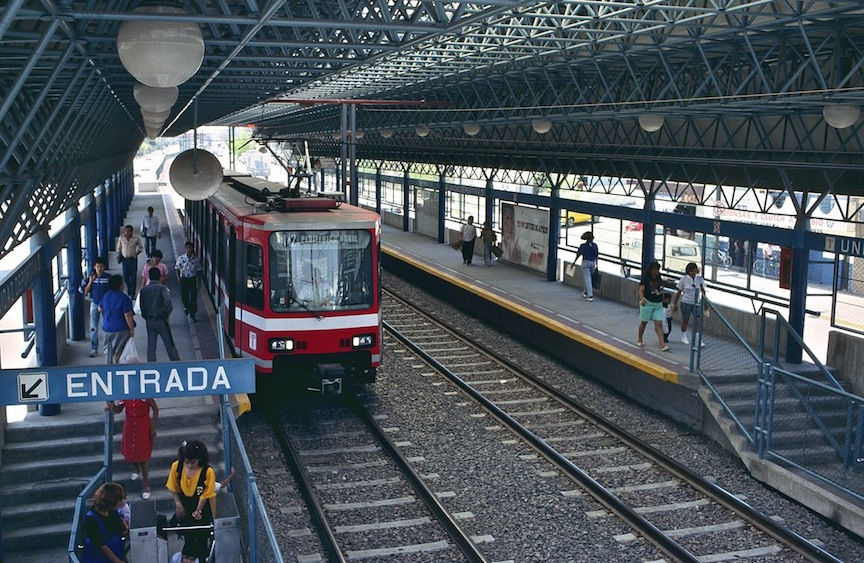
Light rail car at Unidad Deportiva station on the Guadalajara light rail system, the busiest LRT system in North America

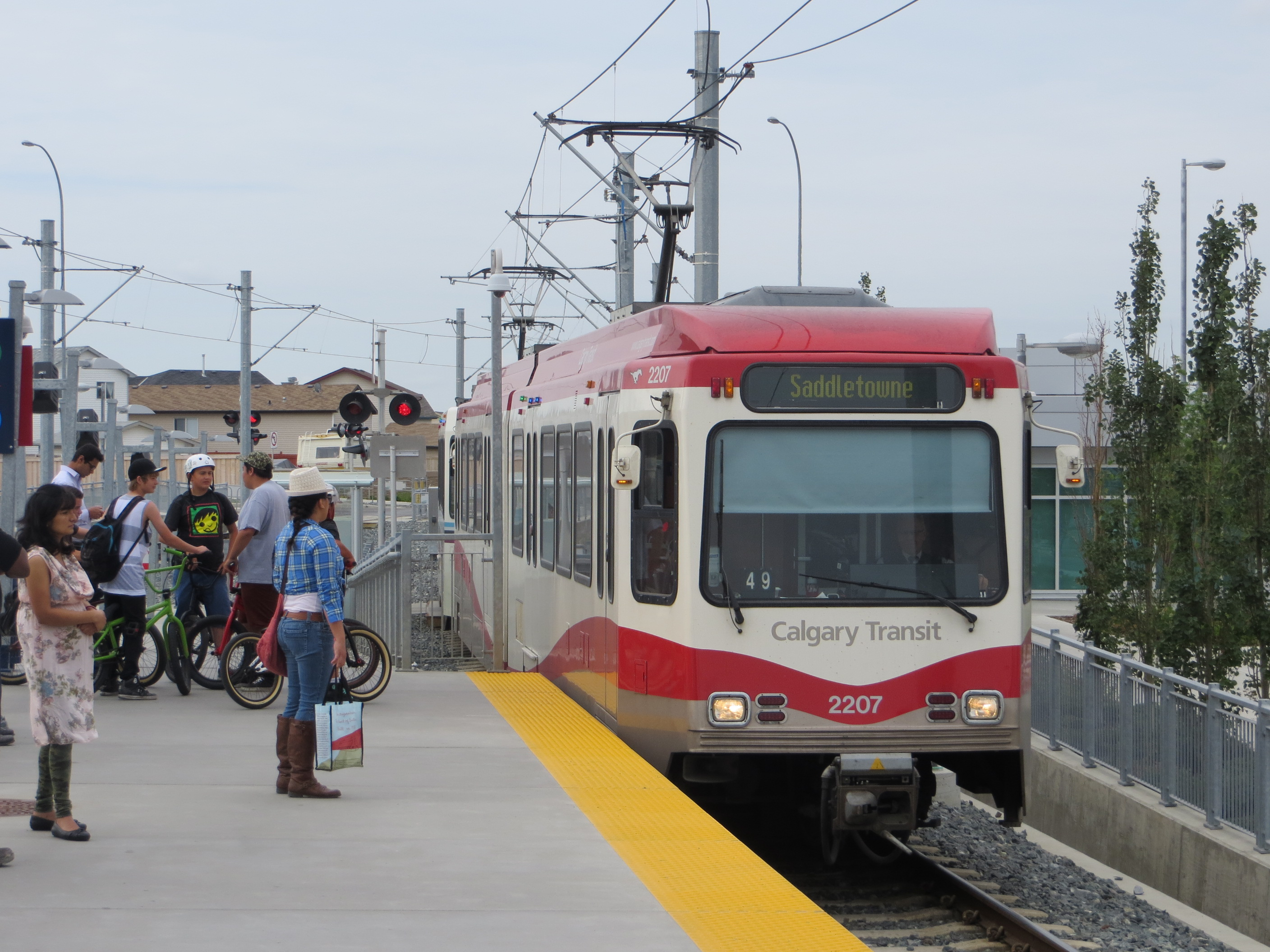
Calgary's CTrain is North America's second-busiest LRT system

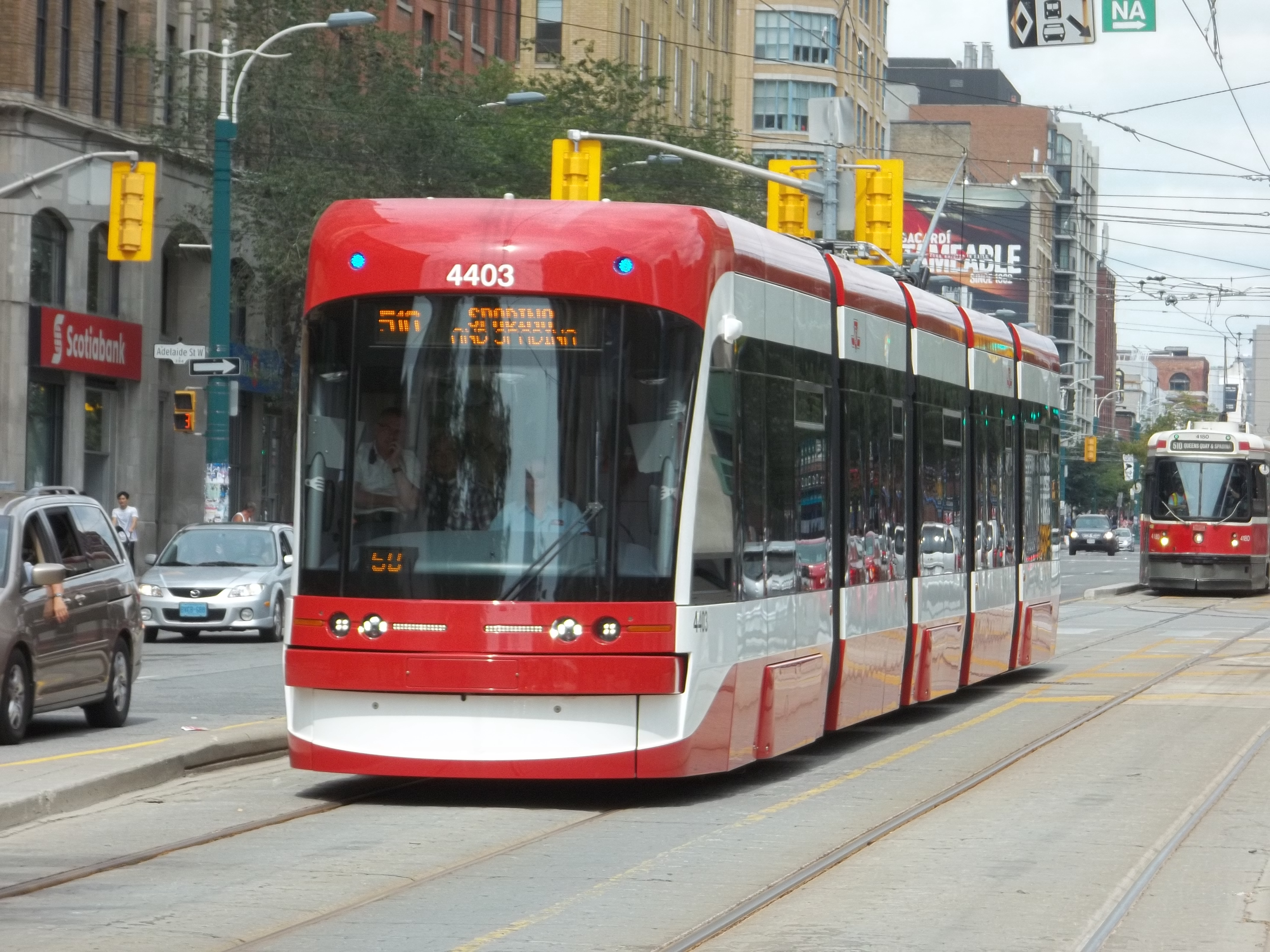
The Toronto streetcar system is the third-busiest LRT system in North America with 8 routes in mixed traffic and 3 in reserved lanes

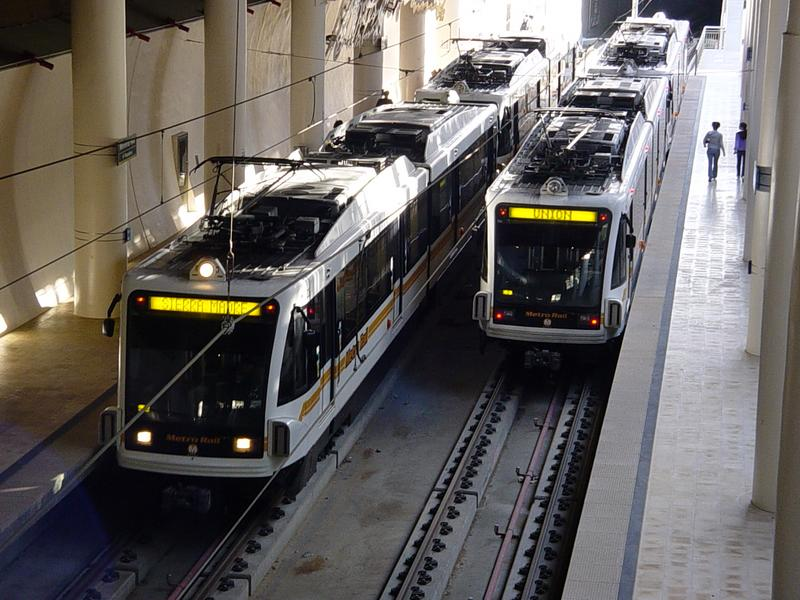
Los Angeles Metro L Line trains in Pasadena, California, North America's fourth-busiest LRT system

Light rail is a commonly used mode of public transit in North America. The term light rail was coined in 1972 by the Urban Mass Transportation Administration (UMTA; the precursor to the U.S. Federal Transit Administration) to describe new streetcar transformations which were taking place in Europe and the United States. The Germans used the term Stadtbahn, which is the predecessor to North American light rail, to describe the concept, and many in UMTA wanted to adopt the direct translation, which is city rail. However, in its reports, UMTA finally adopted the term light rail instead.

== History of streetcars and light rail ==
From the mid-19th century onwards, horse-drawn trams or horsecars were used in cities around the world. In the late 1880s electrically powered street railways became technically feasible following the invention of a trolley pole system of collecting current by American inventor Frank J. Sprague who installed the first successful system at Richmond, Virginia. They became popular because roads were then poorly surfaced, and before the invention of the internal combustion engine and the advent of motor-buses, they were the only practical means of public transport around cities.

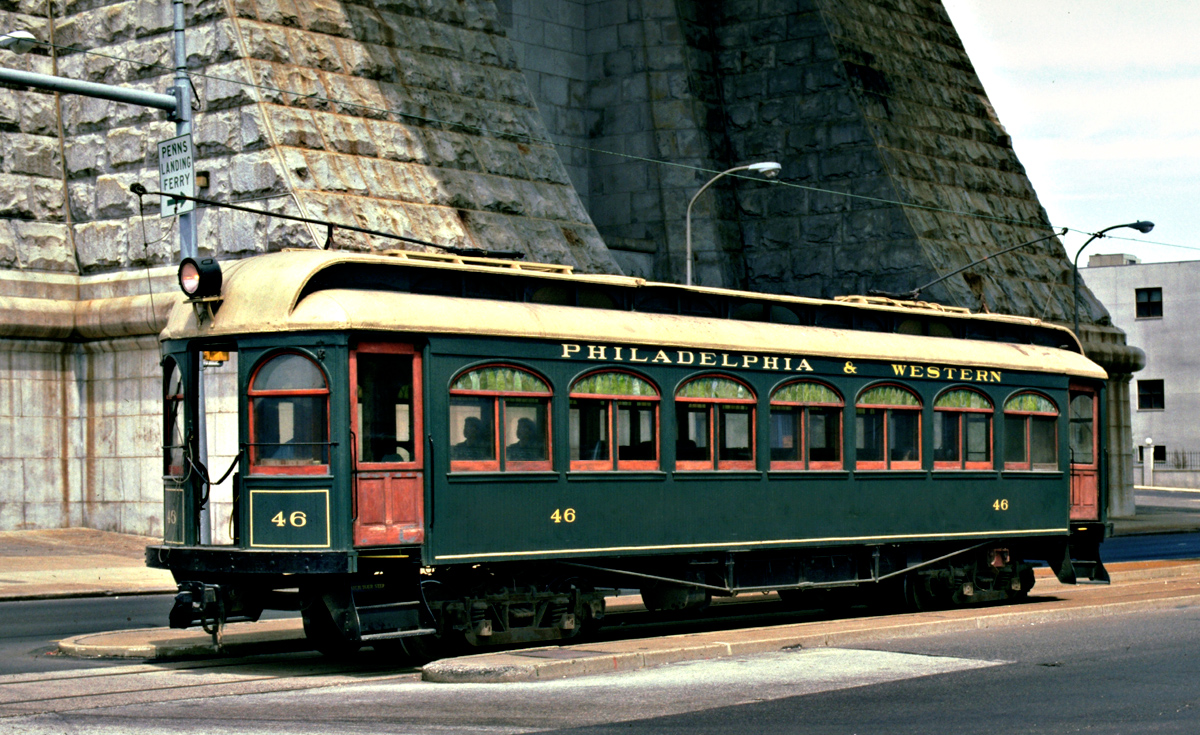
A preserved 1907 streetcar in Philadelphia

The streetcar systems constructed in the 19th and early 20th centuries typically only ran in single-car setups. Some rail lines experimented with multiple unit configurations, where streetcars were joined together to make short trains. When lines were built over longer distances (typically with a single track) before good roads were common, they were generally called interurban streetcars or radial railways in North America.

After World War II, seven major North American cities (Boston, Newark, New Orleans, Philadelphia, Pittsburgh, San Francisco, and Toronto) continued to operate large streetcar systems. Some of these cities called their modernized systems light rail in an attempt to differentiate it from their existing streetcars particularly cities that continued to operate both the old and new systems. Cleveland, Ohio, maintained an interurban system (e.g. the Blue and Green Lines) that is equivalent to what is now "light rail", which opened before World War I, and which is still in operation to this day.

In North America, many of these original streetcar systems were decommissioned in the 1950s and onward as the usage of the automobile increased. Although some traditional trolley or tram systems still exist to this day, the term "light rail" has come to mean a different type of rail system. Modern light rail technology has primarily German origins, since an attempt by Boeing Vertol to introduce a new American light rail vehicle was a technical failure.

The renaissance of light rail in North American began in 1978 when the Canadian city of Edmonton, Alberta adopted the German Siemens-Duewag U2 system, followed three years later by Calgary, Alberta and San Diego, California.

Historically, the rail gauge has had considerable variations, with narrow gauge common in many early systems. However, most light rail systems are now standard gauge. An important advantage of standard gauge is that standard railway maintenance equipment can be used on it, rather than custom-built machinery. Using standard gauge also allows light rail vehicles to be delivered and relocated conveniently using freight railways and locomotives. Additionally, more manufacturers are able to produce standard gauge vehicles, reducing costs for rolling stock acquisition. Another factor favoring standard gauge is that low-floor vehicles are becoming popular, and there is generally insufficient space for wheelchairs to move between the wheels in a narrow gauge layout.

The use of a proof-of-payment fare collection system is standard practice on modern North American light rail systems, as it reduces the dwell time at stations by allowing passengers to board and alight at all doorways of a light rail vehicle (LRV) or train.

== Hybrid rail (diesel light rail) ==
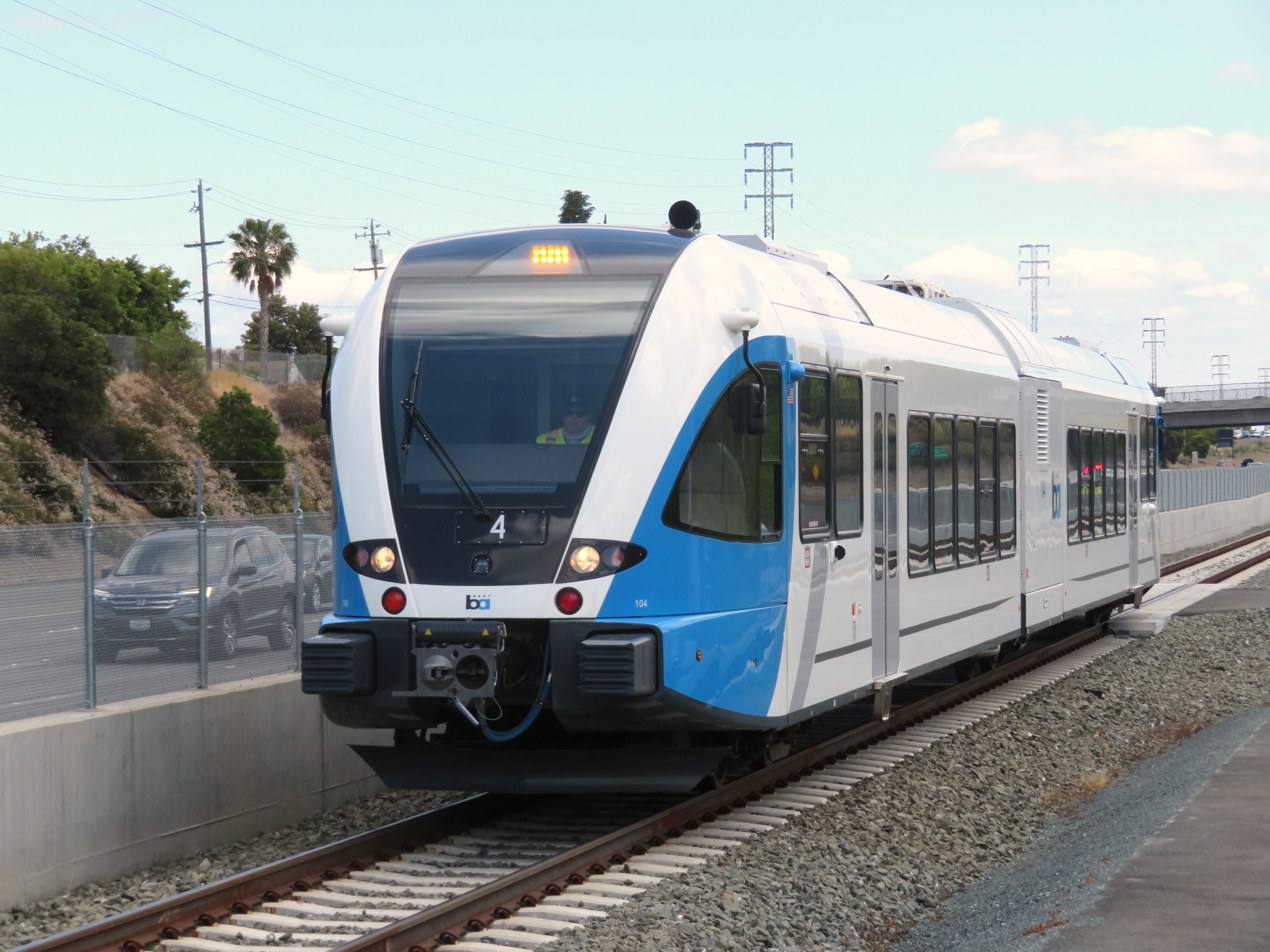
eBART train approaching Pittsburg Center, operating in a dedicated right of way (May 2018)

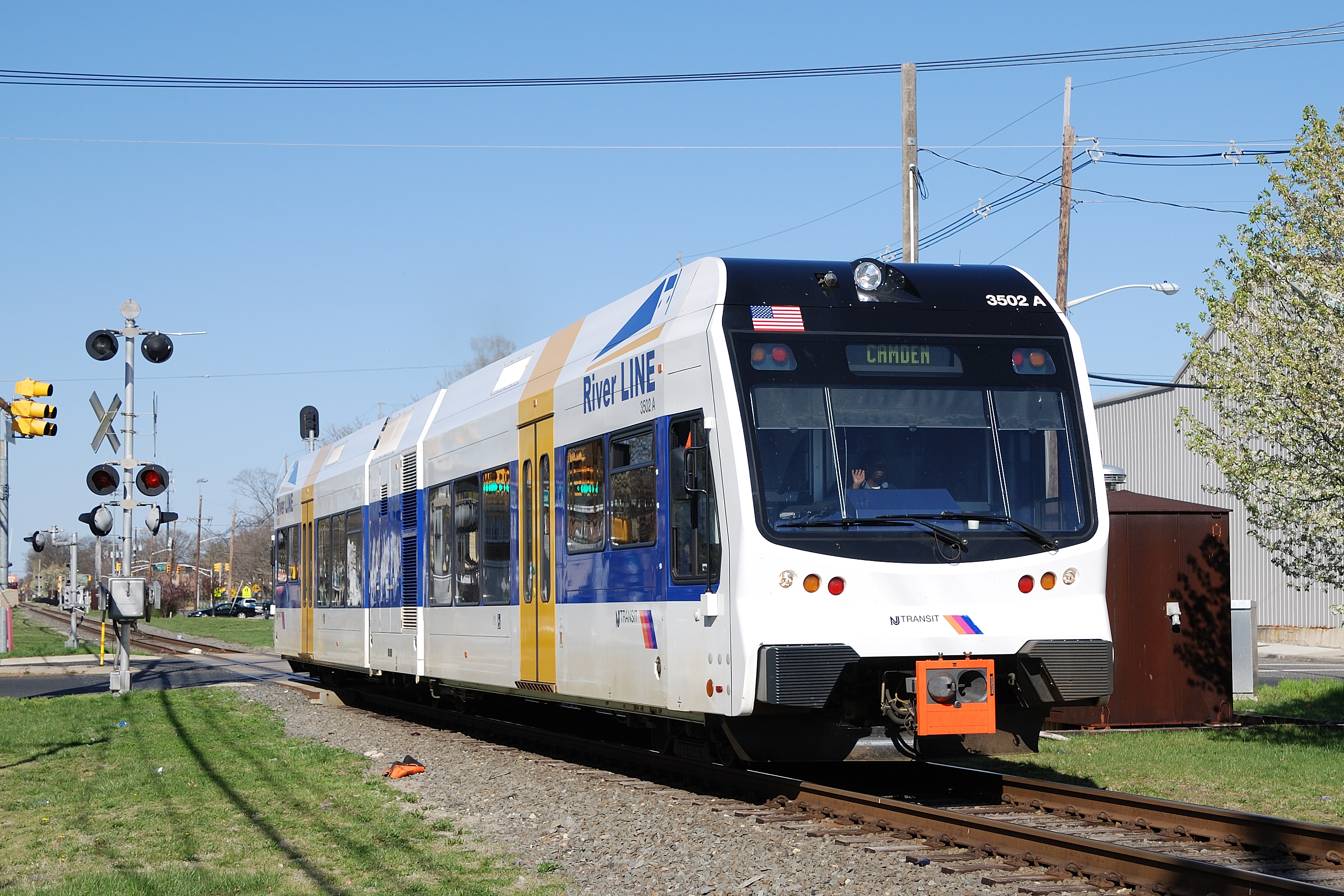
New Jersey River Line DMU, at a level crossing (April 2007)

A few systems in North America use diesel multiple units, including: O-Train lines 2 and 4 in Ottawa (opened in 2001 and 2025 respectively); the River Line in New Jersey (opened in 2004); Sprinter in northern San Diego County, California (opened in 2008); and eBART in eastern Contra Costa County, California (opened in 2018). Hybrid rail operations are chosen in corridors where lower ridership is expected (and thus do not justify the expense of the electric power infrastructure) or which have an "interurban" nature with stations spaced relatively far apart (electric power provides greater acceleration, making it essential for operations with closely spaced stations). Operations with diesel-powered trains can be an interim measure until ridership growth and the availability of funding allow the system to be upgraded to electric power operations.

== Ridership on light rail in North America ==
The following table lists the fifteen light rail systems in North America with the highest riderships in 2024:

	City/metro area served	Country	Light rail system	Annual ridership (2024)
1	Guadalajara	Mexico	SITEUR	168,605,000
2	Calgary	Canada	CTrain	94,097,200
3	Toronto	Canada	Toronto streetcar system	79,295,000
4	Los Angeles	United States	Los Angeles Metro Rail	46,178,300
5	San Diego	United States	San Diego Trolley	41,069,900
6	Boston	United States	Massachusetts Bay Transportation Authority	30,631,700
7	Seattle	United States	Link light rail	30,438,000
8	Mexico City	Mexico	Mexico City Light Rail	29,545,000
9	San Francisco	United States	Muni Metro	29,361,800
10	Edmonton	Canada	Edmonton LRT	29,145,000
11	Portland, Oregon	United States	MAX Light Rail	24,383,900
12	Dallas	United States	Dallas Area Rapid Transit (DART)	22,237,700
13	Jersey City, New Jersey	United States	NJ Transit	22,215,800
14	Ottawa	Canada	O-Train	20,838,300
15	Minneapolis	United States	METRO Light Rail	15,489,100

In general, ridership on light rail systems in Mexico and Canada tends to be higher than the corresponding ridership on light rail systems in the United States, especially on a boardings per mile basis where the Mexican systems (Guadalajara light rail system and Mexico City Light Rail) rank first and second, and three Canadian systems (Calgary's CTrain, Edmonton LRT and Toronto's streetcars) rank third, fifth and seventh. On a boardings per mile basis, the most ridden light rail systems in the United States are again Boston's MBTA ranked sixth, followed by San Francisco's Muni Metro ranked eighth.

== Light rail in Canada ==
Location	System	Year opened	System length	Stations	Lines	Latest expansion	Type
Calgary	CTrain	1981	59.9 km (37.2 mi)	45	2	2014	Light rail
Edmonton	Edmonton LRT	1978	37.4 km (23.2 mi)	29	3	2023	Light rail
Ottawa	O-Train	2001	35.5 km (22.1 mi)	25	3	2025	Light rail
Toronto (Note: Toronto also has a metro / rapid transit system, in addition to its streetcar system. See List of metro systems.)	Toronto streetcar system	1861	82 km (51 mi)	708	11	2016	Streetcar
Toronto	Toronto subway (Line 5 & Line 6) (Note: Line 5 and 6 are integrated with the city's heavy rail metro system but are light rail)	2025	29.3 km (18.2 mi)	43	2	2026	Light rail
Waterloo Region	Ion LRT	2019	19 km (12 mi)	19	1	n/a	Light rail

In general, Canadian cities have rates of public transit use which are two to three times as high as comparably sized U.S. cities. Census data for 2016 show that 12.4% of Canadians use public transit to commute to work, compared to 5.4% of Americans. This means that transportation planners must allow for higher passenger volumes on Canadian transit systems than American ones.

There are a number of LRT proposals in Canada, a few of which are under construction, such as Line 1 in Ottawa, Line 5 in Toronto and Ion in Waterloo Region, Ontario.

=== Calgary ===
At present, there are 45 stations in operation along the 58.7-kilometer (36.5 mi) CTrain light rail system. There are four legs in the system radiating directionally out into the suburbs from the downtown core that are connected by shared tracks along a downtown transit mall. They have been organized into two CTrain lines (identified as the Red Line and the Blue Line on network maps). The legs, as built in chronological order, are the South (1981), the Northeast (1985), the Northwest (1987), and the West (2012). Route 201 (Red Line) connects the South and Northwest lines; Route 202 (Blue Line) connects the Northeast and West lines. The two routes share most of the downtown line on the 7th Avenue South transit mall; the exception is the Downtown West – Kerby station, which serves only Route 202. The planned Route 203 - Green line will add about 40 kilometres (25 mi) and 28 stations to the system by connecting a North leg to a Southeast leg, probably in a tunnel underneath the existing downtown transit mall. Construction on it is expected to start in 2017.

In late 2015, Calgary Transit started running four-car trains to alleviate congestion as the system exceed 300,000 passengers per weekday. The longer trains can carry 800 passengers per train compared to 600 on three-car trains, a 33% increase. This upgrade required rebuilding or relocating all 45 station platforms to accommodate the longer trains, and buying 63 new vehicles to add another car to each train. Trains will be lengthened as more vehicles are delivered from the manufacturer.

=== Edmonton ===
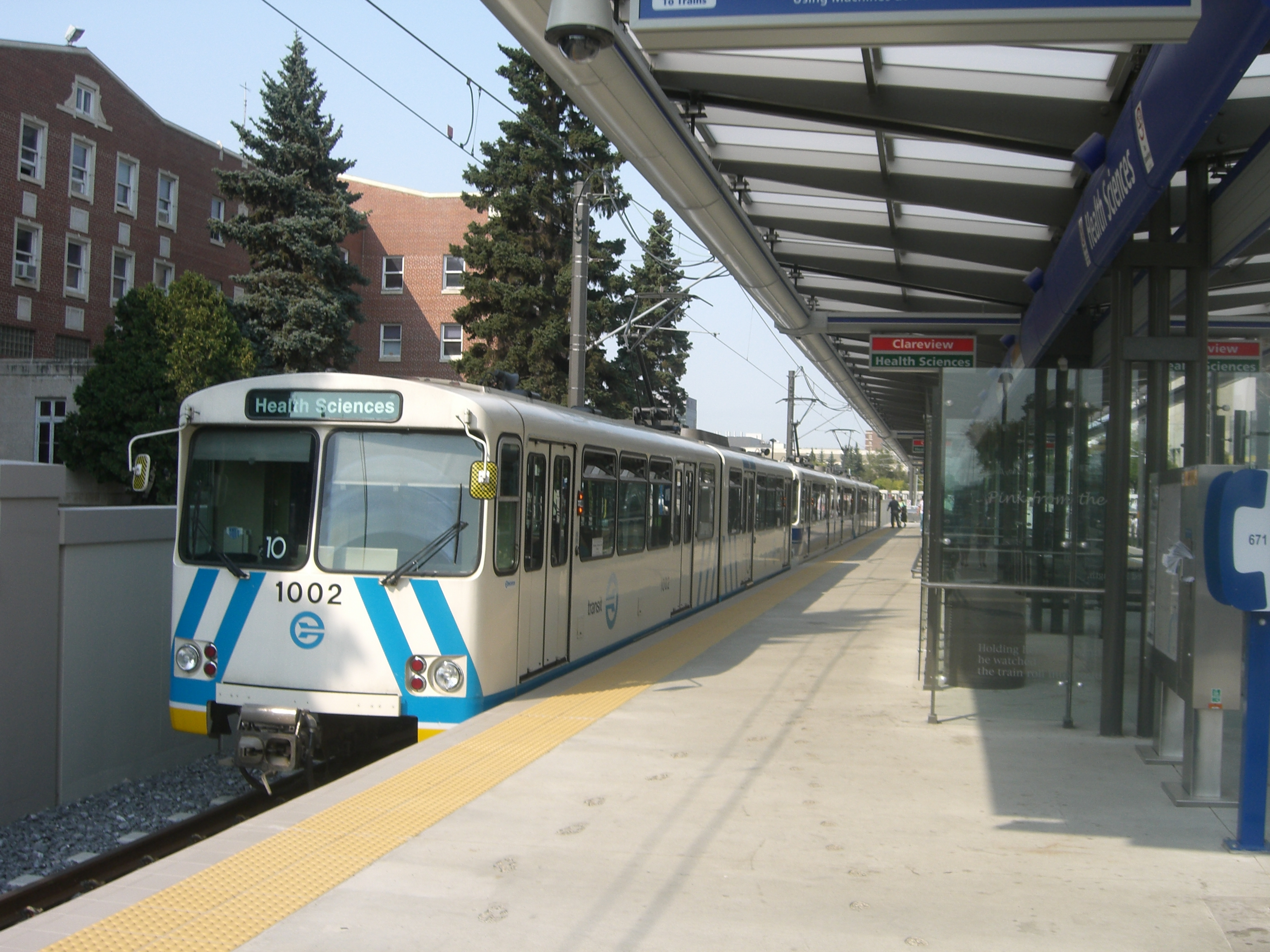
Edmonton's original Siemens U2 Light Rail vehicle in an above-ground station

Edmonton was the first city in North America to build a modern (second generation) light rail system. The route (today called the Capital Line) first started construction in 1974, and opened its first segment on April 22, 1978, in time for the 1978 Commonwealth Games. The Edmonton Transit System built much of its initial light rail system underground, which meant that it could not afford to lay as much track to the suburbs at the time of its opening. The system has grown incrementally since its opening, and as of 2010 had grown to a 21-kilometer (13 mi) long light rail line serving a total of 15 stations. The system is successful by North American standards, with an average weekday ridership of 93,600 passengers in 2010. The City of Edmonton has focused on LRT expansion plans since 2007. The Metro Line, a branch of the existing Capital Line, opened in September 2015. The separate Valley Line, under construction as of 2025, but with its first 13.1-kilometre (8.1 mi) phase opened in November 2023, uses low-floor vehicles.

=== Ottawa ===
In 2001, to supplement its bus rapid transit (BRT) system, Ottawa opened a diesel light rail pilot project, the O-Train, which was relatively inexpensive to construct (CA$21 million), due to its single-track route along a little used freight-rail right of way and use of diesel multiple units (DMUs) to avoid the cost of building overhead lines along the tracks.

With the construction of Line 1, the O-Train brand has been extended to both rail transit services and the diesel line has been renamed as the Line 2. O-Train Line 2 is an 19 km (12 mi) diesel light rail line running north to south from Bayview to Limebank connecting with a transitway at each terminus. There are three passing sidings along the single-track line. Line 1 is a light rail line that runs east-west from Blair to Tunney's Pasture connecting to a transitway at each terminus and with Line 2 at Bayview. The line runs both underground and on the surface. There is a tunnel downtown with three underground stations. As of 2020, the system is in Stage 2 construction to add 24 new stations on the east and west ends of Line 1 and to add new stations between existing ones. A south expansion on Line 2 was also constructed. The Stage 2 project is set to be complete by 2027.

=== Toronto ===
Most of the 11 routes of the Toronto streetcar system operate in mixed traffic, but three of them (509 Harbourfront, 510 Spadina and 512 St. Clair) as well as a 3-kilometre (1.9 mi) portion of the 501 Queen in the median of The Queensway have similarity to light rail in that there is a high degree of separation from road traffic by using reserved lanes with some track in tunnels.

=== Waterloo Region ===
The first phase of the 19-kilometre LRT system runs from Conestoga station in Waterloo to Fairway station in Kitchener. It opened to the public on June 21, 2019. Waterloo Region, Ontario has also approved plans for a light rail extension to the Ainslie St. Transit Terminal in Cambridge, as phase two of Ion. The Kitchener to Cambridge segment will be operated as adapted bus rapid transit.

== Light rail in Mexico ==
Location	System	Year opened	System length	Stations	Lines	Latest expansion	Type
Guadalajara	Sistema de Tren Eléctrico Urbano	1989	45.5 km (28.3 mi)	48	3	2020	Light rail
Mexico City (Note: Mexico City also has a metro/rapid transit system, in addition to its light rail system. See List of metro systems.)	Mexico City Light Rail	1986	12.8 km (8.0 mi)	18	1	1995	Light rail

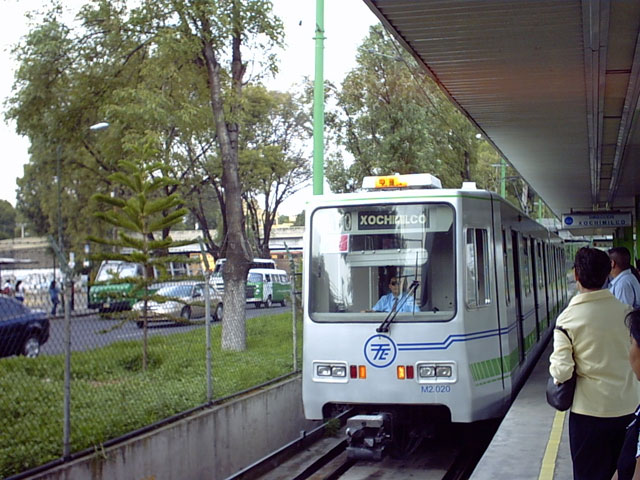
Light rail car at Estadio Azteca station on the Mexico City Light Rail line in Mexico City

There are two light rail systems in Mexico: Guadalajara's, and Mexico City's light rail line (known locally as the Tren Ligero, Spanish for 'light rail'). A third system, Monterrey's Metrorrey also has some characteristics of a light rail system (especially in its use of high-floor light rail vehicles), but runs in a fully grade separated, exclusive right-of-way with high passenger volumes, which are generally the criteria assigned to "metro" or heavy rail systems; thus Metrorrey is considered to be a full metro system by at least the UITP transport organization and so is not included here.

Both of Mexico's light rail systems have among the highest riderships of any North American light rail system. Guadalajara's light rail system, despite being only about 45.5 km (28.3 mi) long, transported an average of 450,601 passengers per day in the fourth quarter of 2024, translating into 19,800 daily boardings per mile, which was the highest per mile boarding rate of any North American light rail system. This is nearly double the rate of the next system, the Mexico City Light Rail, which saw 11,010 boardings per mile in the same period.

== Light rail in the United States ==
The United States has a number of light rail systems in its mid-sized to large cities. As of December 2019, there were 30 light rail and 38 streetcar systems offering regular year-round transit service, for a total of over 68 operational light rail-type systems in the United States.

=== First generation ===
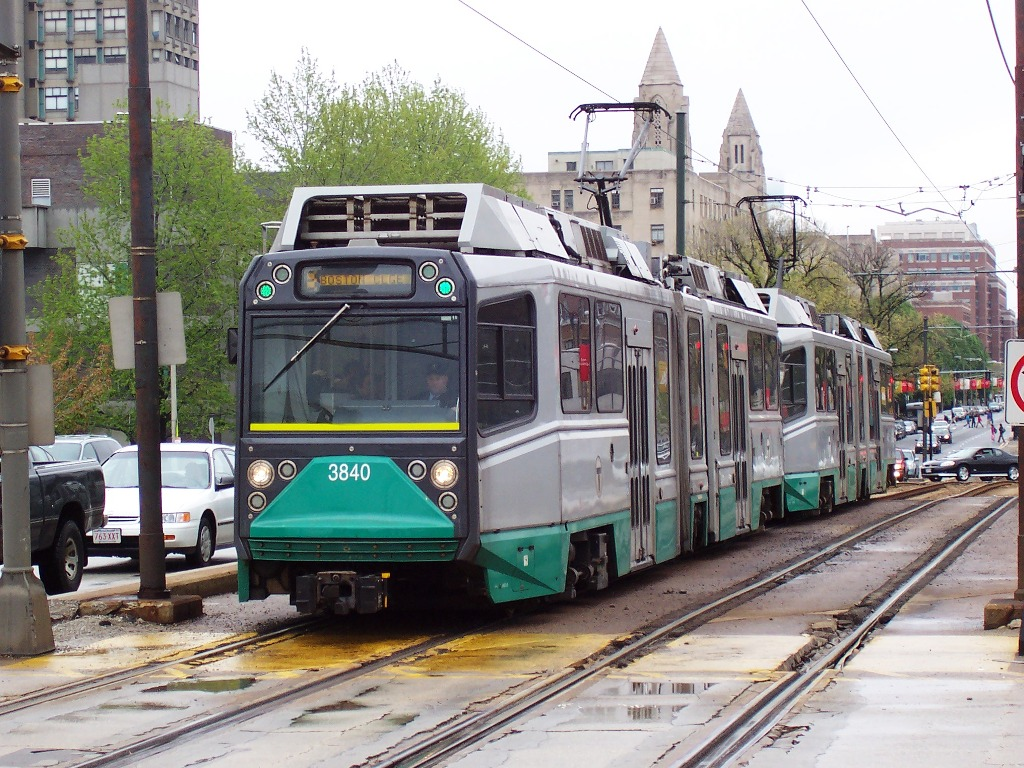
Boston's Green Line is one of the surviving first-generation systems, and is the sixth-busiest light rail system in North America.

Seven first-generation streetcar systems remained in operation after many U.S. streetcar systems were replaced by buses between the 1950s and 1970s. In each city, the surviving lines represent only a small portion of the larger streetcar networks that once existed. These systems generally remained in operation because they included infrastructure not easily adaptable to bus service, such as subway tunnels or private rights-of-way, while continuing to carry relatively high ridership. Most of the surviving systems have since undergone varying degrees of modernization.

The New Orleans streetcar system, established in 1835, is the oldest continuously operating street railroad in the world. Many lines would be converted to bus service after 1924. However, several lines have remained unaltered from their initial alignments, and some expansions of the system have been performed. Boston's Tremont Street subway was the first rapid transit tunnel built in North America in 1897, and was intended to speed up service by removing streetcars from the traffic-clogged streets. That tunnel would later see modern light rail service in the form of the Green Line light rail network. The Ashmont–Mattapan High-Speed Line was converted from a commuter rail line in 1929, and has continuously used PCC streetcars since. Cleveland and Philadelphia have light rail systems originally built as interurban railroads that only received maintenance and rolling stock improvements while offering nearly the same services since their inceptions. Additionally, Philadelphia's system of subway–surface streetcar lines, which utilize a tunnel in the downtown area, were largely established in their current configuration by 1956. Newark Light Rail was only fully converted from PCC streetcars to modern light rail vehicles in 2001, having been operating since the 1930s.

Of the seven surviving historic streetcar systems, two of these have seen their service substantial revamped and modernized since their inception. By World War II, most of San Francisco's streetcar routes had been converted to buses, but some lines still utilized exclusive right of ways. The upper level of the newly constructed Market Street subway, originally intended to carry several lines of the Bay Area Rapid Transit system, was given to the San Francisco Municipal Railway to establish the Muni Metro. Simultaneously, PCC cars were replaced with modern light rail vehicles, service rerouted from the surface, and several stations were upgraded to include high-level platforms. Total rerouting took place in 1982, however large parts of the network still feature street running sections and varying degrees of traffic separation.

After failing to establish a people mover system in the city, Pittsburgh sought to revitalize their South Hills trolley lines and establish more reliable transit. A new downtown tunnel was approved, and the line was rehabilitated to light rail standards with new extensions planned. Light rail trains began running in 1984 with the tunnel opening in 1985.

=== Second generation ===
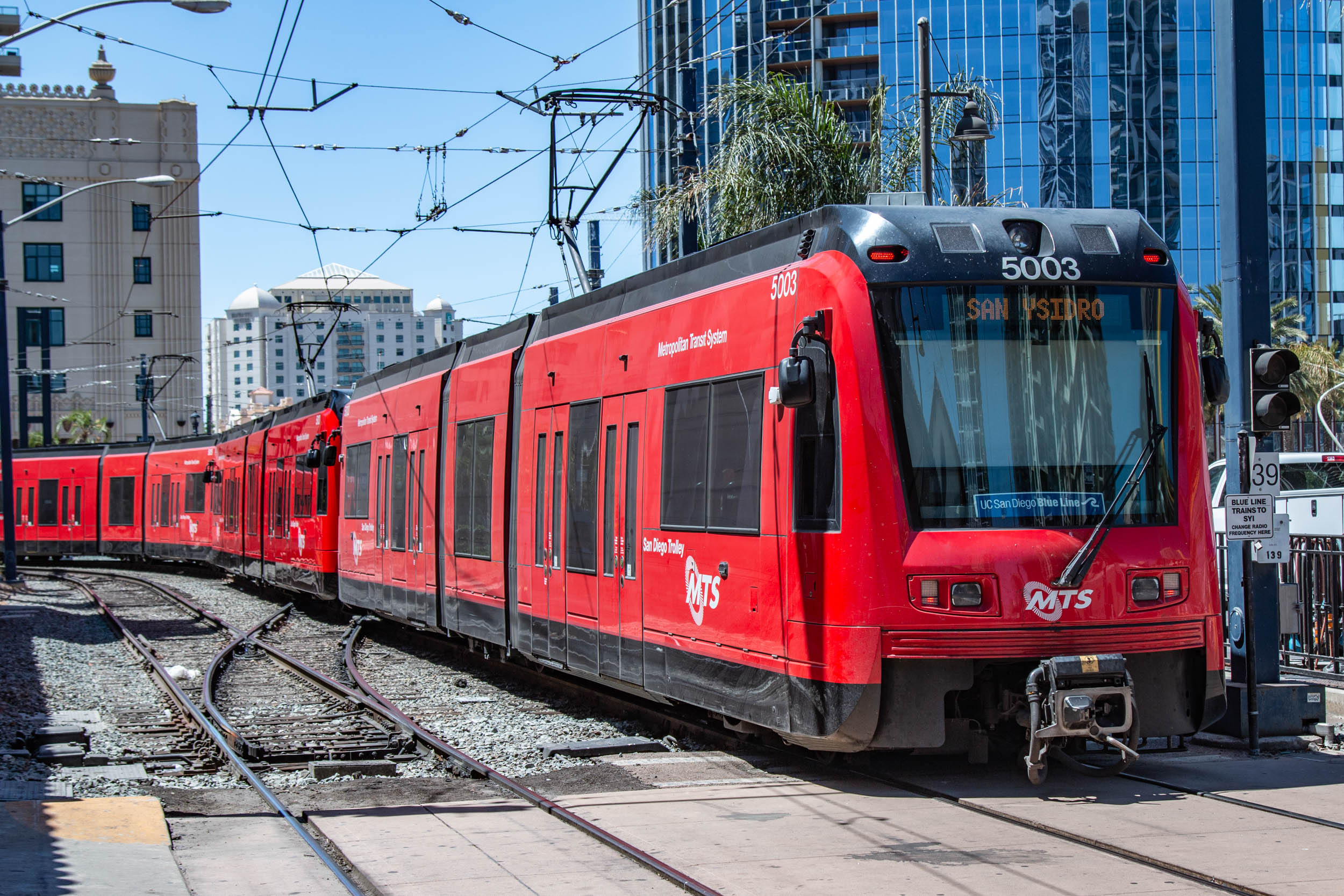
The San Diego Trolley was the first of the second-generation systems, and is the fifth-busiest light rail system in North America.

The remaining examples are all second-generation light rail and streetcar systems. San Diego built what is considered the first newly constructed light rail system in the United States which was opened in 1981. Streetcar service in the city had ended in 1949, and planning for a new rapid transit system was undertaken in 1966. Light rail was chosen for several reasons, including its ability to travel at high speed for long distances, power cost compared to full heavy rail rapid transit, ability to utilize at-grade construction, minimizing of operating deficit, and expediency of construction. The first right of way was acquired from Southern Pacific railroad in 1978, and many features of the system were added incrementally. As of 2019, the system features over 50 miles (80 km) of service routes and is undergoing expansion.

In the 1980s, this system was followed by new light rail installations in Buffalo, Portland, Sacramento, and San Jose. Many new systems followed in the 1990s, and approximately 20 more new light rail and streetcar systems have followed since 2000.

==== Heritage streetcars ====
Some cities have established heritage streetcar operations to preserve equipment and infrastructure in addition to offering transit services. San Francisco ran temporary historic trolley services starting during the 1983 Historic Trolley Festival, restoring service to the Market Street Railway, though on a shorter route than its predecessor lines. Streetcar tracks were revealed underneath the streets of Dallas in the 1980s, and a movement to restart streetcar service culminated on the M-Line Trolley (then known as the McKinney Avenue Transit Authority) starting operation in 1989. San Francisco's F Market became permanent in 1995. The Memphis, Tennessee MATA Trolley heritage streetcar route was entirely newly built, with refurbished streetcars running in mixed traffic.

== See also ==
- List of tram and light rail transit systems
- List of rail transit systems in the United States
