= Streetcars in Mexico City =

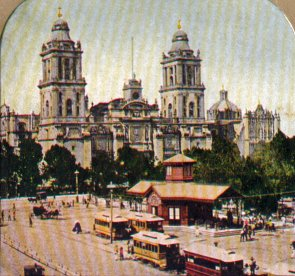
Zócalo square and the Metropolitan Cathedral in 1900. Note the streetcars and station in front.

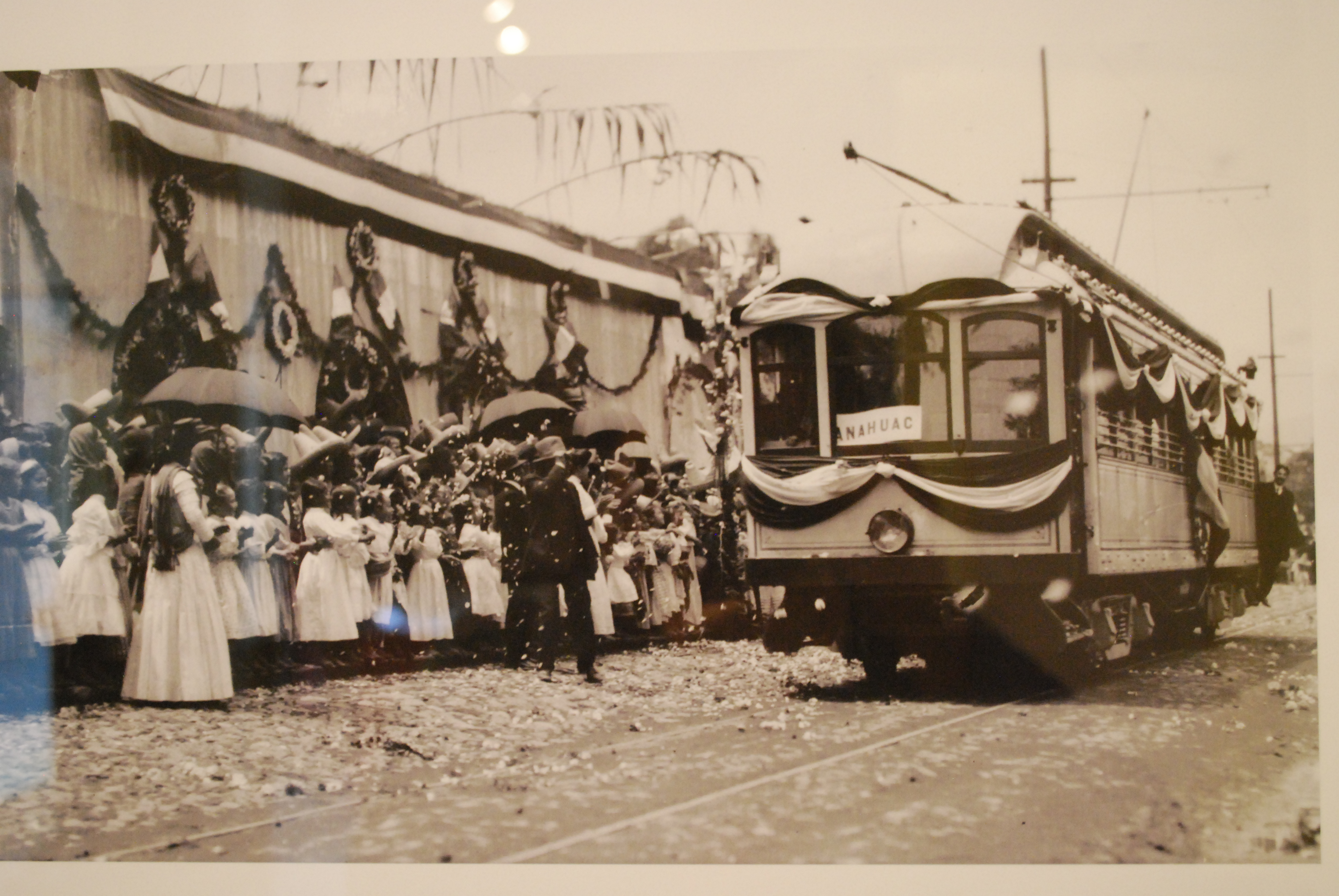
Opening ceremony for the city's first electric streetcar line

Mexico City once had an extensive network of streetcars. Most streetcar lines in Mexico City radiated from the city's central square, the Zócalo towards many parts of the city. By the 1980s only one streetcar line survived, which itself was converted into the Xochimilco Light Rail line in 1986.

== History ==
At the beginning of the 19th century, Mexico City was in need of new means of transportation. Since the 1830s efforts had been made to build a railway.

In 1840, 1849, and 1959, various concessions were granted to build a permanent urban railway without any result.

In 1856, an American Texan, George Louis Hammeken, was granted a concession to build an animal-powered street railway from the Zócalo, Mexico City's central square, to Tacubaya, now in the west-central part of the city. The Ferrocarril de Tacubaya opened on January 1, 1858.

July 4, 1858, president Ignacio Comonfort opened the first railway line between Mexico City and Villa Guadalupe (La Villa).

In 1868 the "Ferrocarril de Chalco" opened a second street railway to Tacubaya along Avenida Chapultepec. This network was extended to San Ángel and Tlalpan in 1869; however it never was extended to the line's namesake town of Chalco.

The Ferrocarril de Tacubaya opened a second line to Popotla, near the Calzada México-Tacuba (Tacuba causeway).

After these initial lines, different companies were created for the exploitation of street railways.

The Compañía de Ferrocarriles del Distrito Federal, organized in 1878, began to install lines for animal-powered street railways including one in the Calzada de Tlalpan (Tlalpan Causeway), and controlled street railway lines until 1901. In 1882 it was reorganized and absorbed a large part of the street railway network in the city.

In 1890 that company had 3000 mules, 600 cars, and 200 kilometers (120 mi) of rail line. Lines ran north as far as Tlalnepantla, as far south as Tlalpan, as far east as Peñón de los Baños.

=== Electric streetcars ===
In 1896 the then-municipal government of Mexico City (the Ayuntamiento de México) authorized the Federal District Railways to change from animal to electric power. This order did not result in an immediate switch, because an analysis needed to be performed of the benefits and issues that switching would cause. The advantages of switching to electric included:

- Better conservation of the street paving
- Shorter trip times
- Increased frequency

The Servicio de Transportes Eléctricos (STE; translates as "Electric Transport Service") was organized in 1947, to replace the privately run Compañía de Tranvías de México ("Street Railway Company of Mexico").

January 15, 1900, was the first day of electric streetcar service between Chapultepec and Tacubaya. Animal-powered street railways would continue to operate in the city along with electric streetcars for another thirty years.

March 1, 1901, the Compañía de Tranvías Eléctricos de México took ownership of the city's street railway network.

In 1909 the first phase of the Necaxa Dam was completed, which allowed an expansion of the streetcar network.

=== Decline ===
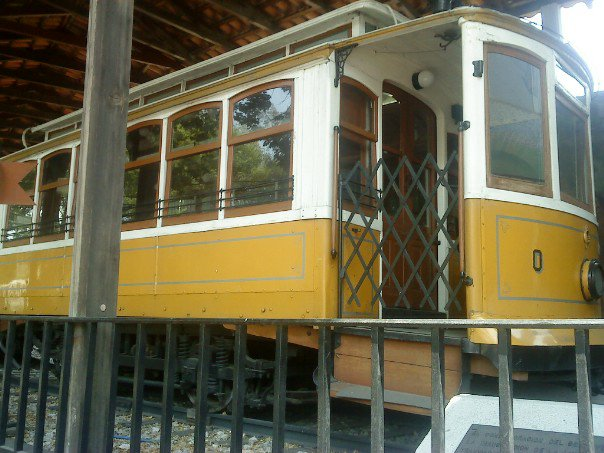
The "Cerito" streetcar. It served the "Historic Circuit" tourist route created in 1971.

February 21, 1953, two cars crashed on the La Venta line, which closed and never was reopened. STE also closed the Coyoacán, Iztapalapa, Lerdo and Tizapán lines.

In 1969, Mexico City Metro Line 1 opened, which replaced the streetcar line along Avenida Chapultepec. In 1970, Mexico City Metro Line 2 opened, replacing the northern part of the Xochimilco streetcar line.

By 1976 the streetcar network measured 156 kilometers (97 mi), consisting of only 3 lines, due to the construction of the ejes viales, a grid of designated thoroughfares across the city, in conjunction with which it was decided to build new lines for trolleybuses rather than streetcars.

=== Conversion of last streetcar line to light rail ===
The last remaining streetcar line, Tasqueña–Xochimilco, operated with PCC cars until 1984. During the 1985 Mexico City earthquake many cars were damaged. This system was upgraded to a modern light rail system, the Xochimilco light rail line, which opened in stages between 1986 and 1988.

== Map of streetcar network in 1910 ==
Lines of the Mexico Tramways Company, 1910 (Rand McNally)

Red lines = on-street electric lines; Hashed red lines = electric lines on rights-of-ways; Green lines = mule-drawn
