= Servicio de Transportes Eléctricos =

Trolleybus and light rail operator in Mexico City

Coordinates: 19.3672°N 99.1333°W

Servicio de Transportes Eléctricos de la Ciudad de México

Overview
- Owner: Mexico City Government
- Locale: Mexico City, Mexico
- Transit type: Trolleybus, Light rail, Gondola lift
- Number of lines: Trolleybus: 14; Light rail: 1 Cable car: 3
- Website: www.ste.cdmx.gob.mx

Operation
- Began operation: 1947
- Number of vehicles: 360 trolleybuses (approx.); 24 light rail cars

Technical
- Track gauge: 1,435 mm (4 ft 8 1/2 in) standard gauge
- Electrification: Trolleybus: 600 V DC; Light rail: 750 V DC

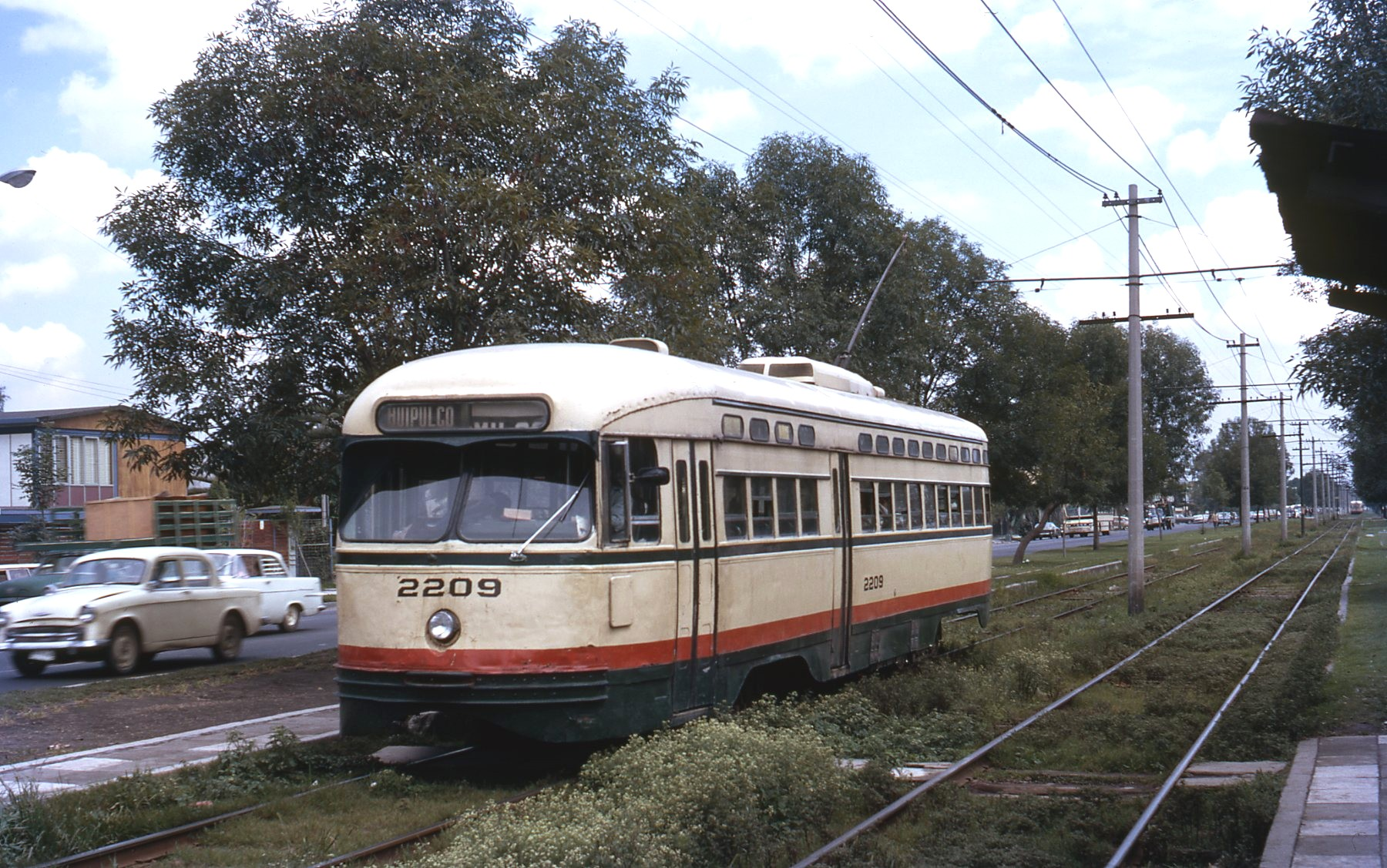
A PCC streetcar of STE in 1971

Servicio de Transportes Eléctricos de la Ciudad de México (STE'; lit. 'Mexico City Electric Transport Service') is a public transport agency responsible for the operation of all trolleybus and light rail services in Mexico City. As its name implies, its routes use only electrically powered vehicles. It was created on 31 December 1946 and is owned by the Mexico City government. STE is overseen by a broader local governmental authority, Secretaria de Movilidad de la Ciudad de México (SEMOVI)(Secretariat of Mobility of Mexico City), formerly (SETRAVI) which also regulates the city's other public transport authorities, including Sistema de Transporte Colectivo (STC, the Mexico City Metro system), Red de Transporte de Pasajeros del Distrito Federal (RTP, diesel bus network) and Metrobús, as well as other forms of transportation in the district. STE's passenger vehicle fleet consists exclusively of trolleybuses, light rail, and aerial lift vehicles, and in 2007 its network carried 88 million passengers, of which 67 million were on trolleybus services and 21 million on light rail.

== History ==
Originally named Servicio de Transportes Eléctricos del Distrito Federal and owned by the then-Mexican Federal District government, STE was created on 31 December 1946 to replace the privately run Compañía de Tranvías de México (Mexico City Tramways Company), operator of the city's tramway/streetcar network. However, it did not completely take over the assets and operations of that company until October 1952. STE also took over the Compañía de Ferrocarriles del Distrito Federal (Mexico City Railways Company) at that time. The agency introduced its first trolleybus route in 1951. To replace worn-out streetcars, STE acquired 274 used PCC cars from U.S. transit companies that were downsizing or abandoning their streetcar systems. Similarly, as it expanded its trolleybus network, the agency turned to American and Canadian transit companies as a relatively inexpensive source of vehicles, acquiring almost 800 secondhand trolleybuses from several different cities in those countries between 1956 and 1977 and later 37 from Edmonton in 1987. These have all since been replaced by trolleybuses built new, in Mexico, by Mexicana de Autobuses SA (MASA) or its successor, Volvo.

== Overview ==
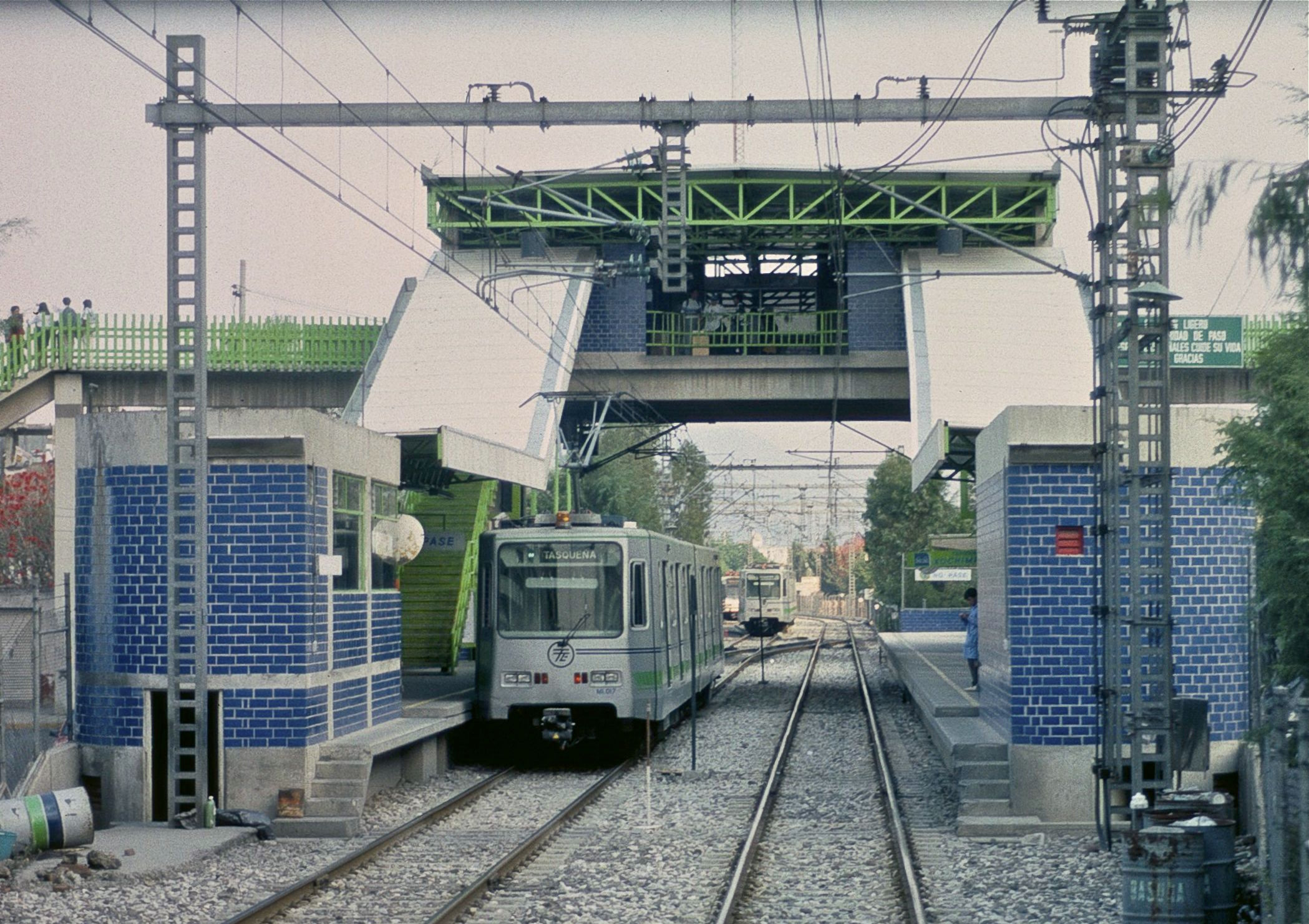
A station on the Tren Ligero, STE's light rail line

STE's Director General (General Manager) is appointed by the Head of Government of the Federal District, or "mayor" of Mexico City. Since December 2018 the position has been held by Guillermo Calderón Aguilera. As of 2008, STE had approximately 2,700 employees.

=== Light rail ===
After May 1979, the only streetcar line still in operation was that from Tasqueña metro station to Xochimilco (route 54) and its short branch to Tlalpan (53). STE upgraded this line in the mid-1980s as light rail, with high-platform stations for faster loading and new articulated light rail cars built using parts from old PCC streetcars, fitted with new bodies. The Xochimilco Light Rail service began operating in 1986, without the Tlalpan branch. It continues in operation today, with newer cars, and locally is known as the Tren Ligero. It is STE's only rail line. Construction of a new streetcar line (or tranvía) in the city center was planned, with STE managing the construction bidding process for the project, but on 31 May 2010 the project was cancelled by mayor Marcelo Ebrard, on cost grounds.

=== Trolleybus ===
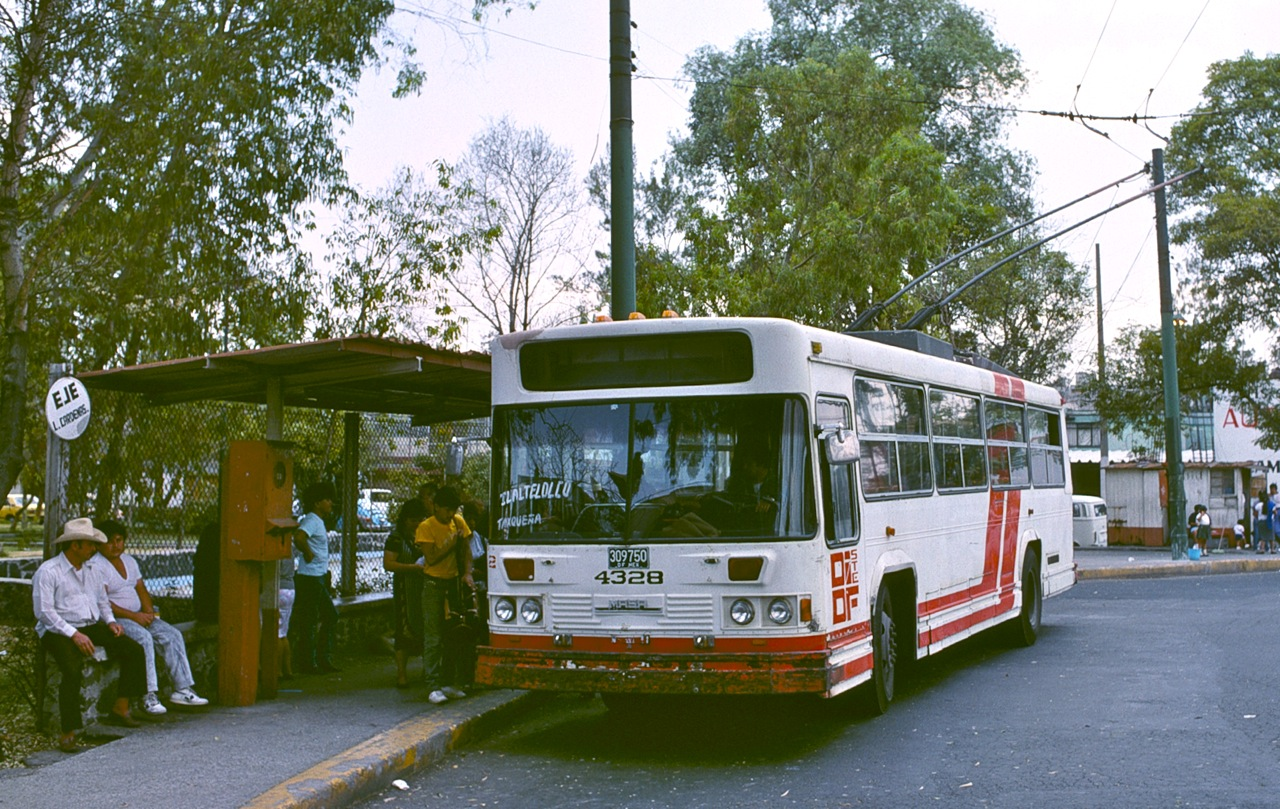
An STE trolleybus at Tasqueña in 1990

After its opening in the 1950s the trolleybus network was gradually expanded. A network of 27 routes in operation in early 1979 was reduced to about 10 later that year, through a reorganization that combined overlapping routes, rather than through abandonments. An expansion program implemented after 1982 raised the number of separate routes back to 27, operated by 30 different services, by the end of 1988. STE's network reached its widest geographic coverage at that point, when the route most-distant from the city center was one from Tláhuac to Milpa Alta, in the far southeastern corner of the Federal District. This coverage was maintained only until early 1991. Although new routes were opened in 1995, 1997 and 2005, overall STE has, since 1991, discontinued more trolleybus routes than it has opened, with only 17 trolleybus routes still in operation in 2007. In 2009 and 2010, construction work on new metro line 12 disrupted surface streets (requiring traffic detours) and caused some STE routes to be replaced by diesel bus routes, which were operated by RTP, as STE does not own any diesel buses. These conversions were originally planned be temporary, but whereas metro line 12 opened in October 2012, only one of the affected routes (D) had returned to operation by mid-2014, and a total of only eight trolleybus routes were in operation at that time, a situation that remains unchanged in 2018. The total number of trolleybuses scheduled in peak service each weekday is 264, as of mid-2014, from a fleet of around 360 serviceable vehicles.

==== "Zero-Emissions Corridors" ====
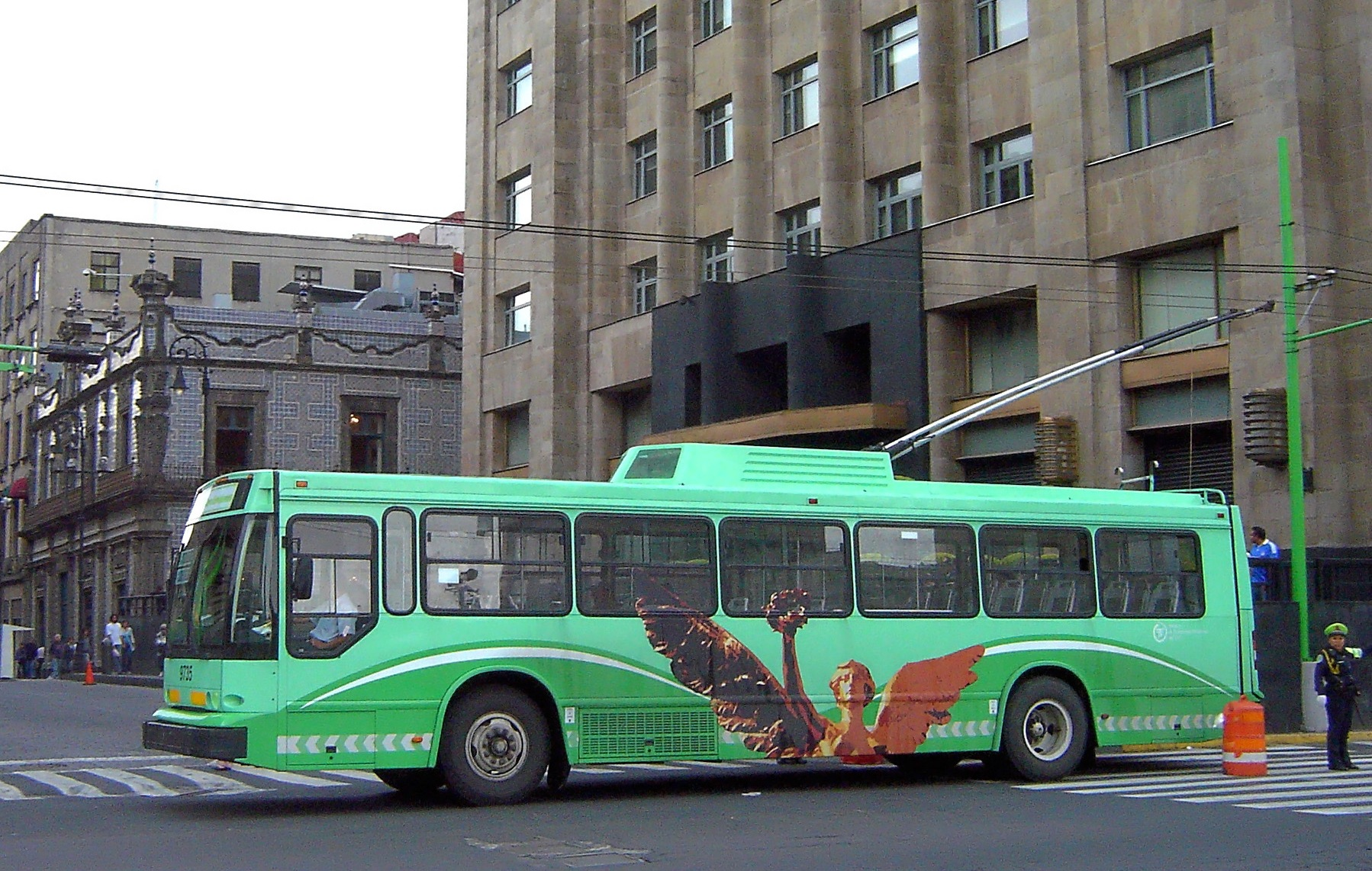
The trolleybuses serving the "Zero-Emissions Corridors" wear a two-tone-green paint scheme, but the distinctive graphic of El Ángel that was originally included (2009) was removed around early 2013.

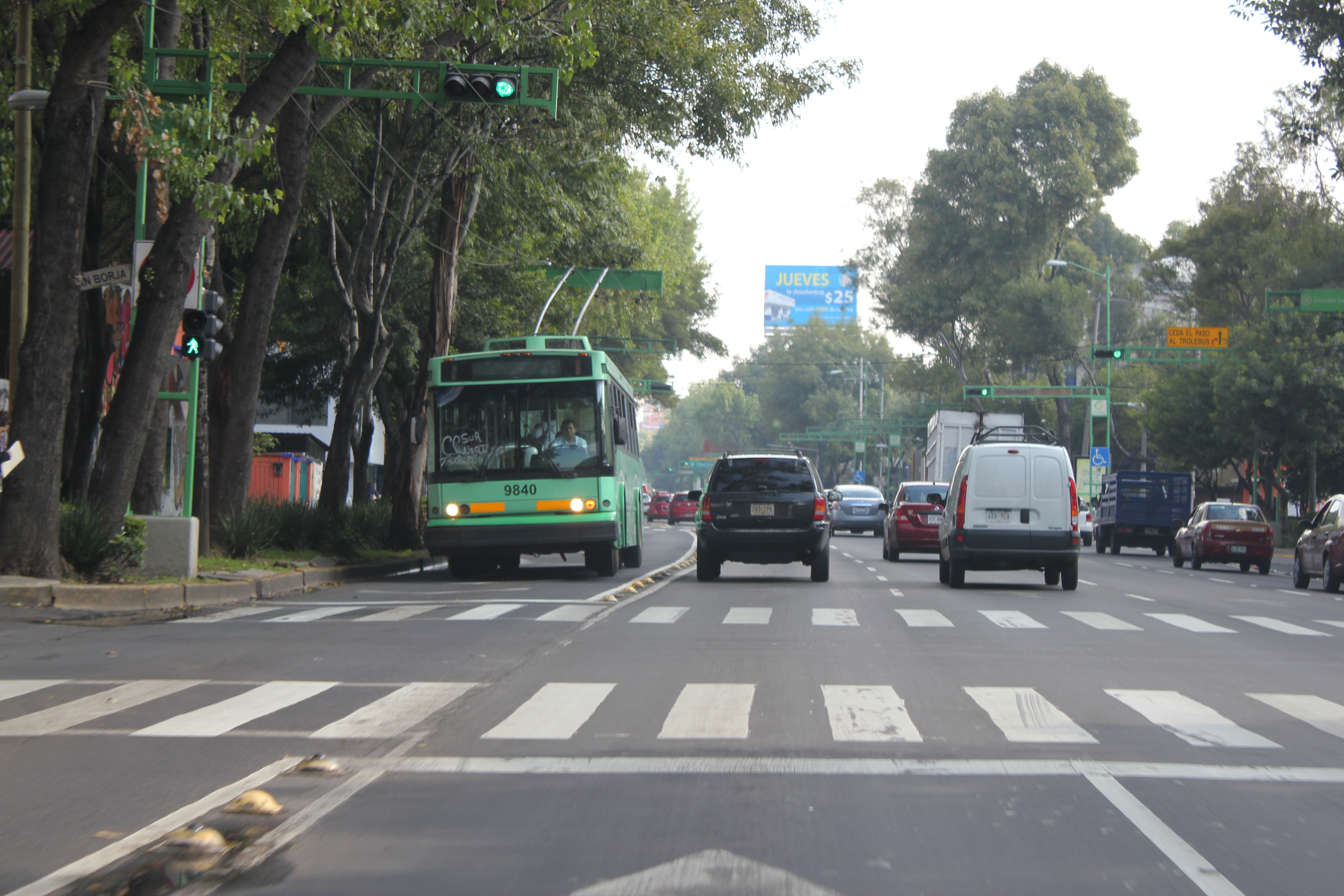
A trolleybus using a trolleybus-only contraflow lane on Eje Central

On 1 August 2009, STE inaugurated its first Corredor Cero Emisiones, or Zero-Emissions Corridor, in which all public transport service along one of the city's major traffic arteries is now provided by electric trolleybuses. This was not a new trolleybus line, but rather an upgrading of an existing line, STE's route A, along Eje Central (Central Traffic Axis, primarily Avenida Lázaro Cárdenas). The route extends for 18.3 kilometres (11.4 mi), from Instituto del Petróleo metro station and the Terminal de Autobuses del Norte (northern intercity bus station) to Tasqueña metro station and the Terminal de Autobuses del Sur (southern intercity bus station). The changes involved in transforming route A into the "Zero-Emissions Corridor" included significantly increasing the frequency of trolleybus service, to an average headway of 2.5 minutes, and banning all non-electric buses and peseros (vans/jitneys) from the corridor. The Eje Central corridor alone now uses about 90–100 trolleybuses at peak times, from a sub-fleet of 120 vehicles reserved for this route. The trolleybuses operate in bus-only lanes, separated from other traffic; such lanes already were present on this route. Several of STE's other trolleybus routes also operate in bus-only lanes over some portions of their route.

Changes to route S (Eje 2/2A Sur) to transform it into a second Zero-Emissions Corridor took place in 2010, and the improved service was put into effect on 21 December 2010. Route S connects Chapultepec metro station with Velódromo metro station and is 9 kilometres (6 mi) long (18 km round trip).

On 1 November 2012, the third Zero-Emissions Corridor was opened, along route D, from Mixcoac metro station to San Andrés Tetepilco, just past the Calzada de Tlalpan, where it connects with metro line 2. The terminus is located in front of STE's main trolleybus depot, which also houses a small museum preserving one of the first electric trams to run in the city, as well as PCC car 2784 and some other historic material and documents.

==== Garages ====
The system has two trolleybus garages (depositos, or depots). The largest is at Tetepilco, also the location of STE's main administrative offices. The second is San Juan de Aragón depot. A third garage, El Rosario, opened in December 1998, as a replacement for a much smaller depot, Azcapotzalco, which had closed in May of that year. However, Deposito El Rosario closed in 2019, leaving the system with two garages. The trolleybus fleet included around 400 vehicles in 2008 and around 360 in 2014.

=== Cablebús ===
In 2021, STE began operating a gondola lift-type cable car service with two lines and 13 stations, known as Cablebús.

=== Non-electric services ===
Starting in November 1997, and lasting for four years, STE operated a few diesel bus routes, at the request of STV following the 1995 bankruptcy of RTP's predecessor, Ruta Cien ("Route 100"). It accepted the transfer of 190 motorbuses to its fleet in conjunction with this, but these and the bus routes were transferred to RTP in November 2001. Otherwise, except for a brief period in the 1960s, STE's service has always used only electric vehicles.

== Fare system ==
STE uses a "flat" fare system, meaning the price is the same regardless of the distance travelled. The current fare is 2.00 pesos on all trolleybus lines except lines A, D and S, the three Corredores Cero Emisiones, on which the fare is 4.00 pesos. Effective 2 January 2010, the fare on the Mexico City light rail line is 3.00 pesos.

On the Tren Ligero, or light rail line, passengers pay the fare at the stations, to ticket vending machines, and the platform of each station is a paid area, with turnstiles preventing access to persons lacking a valid fare. On the trolleybuses, passengers pay the exact fare upon boarding, into fareboxes, with drivers responsible for monitoring fare payment.

In an attempt to modernize the fare systems of the city's major transit systems and make fare payment more convenient, in October 2012 the Mexico City government implemented the use of a prepaid fare card, or stored-value card, called Tarjeta DF ("DF Card") as a payment method valid on the metro system, Metrobús, the STE trolleybus system and the Mexico City Light Rail line.

== See also ==
- Transport in Mexico City
- Trolleybuses of Roma–Condesa
