= Transportation in Mexico City =

- Movilidad Integrada logo

Overview
- Owner: Mexico City Government
- Area served: Mexico City and Greater Mexico City.
- Transit type: Train, Metro, Light Rail, BRT, Trolleybus, Bus, and Shared Bikes.
- Chief executive: Andrés Lajous Loaeza
- Website: https://semovi.cdmx.gob.mx/movilidad-integrada

Operation
- Operators: Sistema de Transporte Colectivo, Metrobús, Servicio de Transportes Eléctricos, Red de Transporte de Pasajeros, Ecobici.
- Character: Multimodal consisting of multiple public transit systems

Transportation in Mexico City consists of an extensive network of public and private transportation services serving Mexico City and the surrounding Greater Mexico City metropolitan area. Transportation in the city includes road infrastructure, private automobiles, taxis, peseros (share taxis and minibuses), rickshaws, bicycle infrastructure, airports, and numerous public transportation systems. The metropolitan area is served by the Benito Juárez International Airport, supplemented by Toluca International Airport and Felipe Ángeles International Airport, both located in the neighboring State of Mexico. Other transportation services include Trajineras, gondola-like boats that operate in the Xochimilco Lake area.

The city's principal public transportation agencies are coordinated through the Mexico City Integrated Mobility System (Spanish: Sistema de Movilidad Integrada de la Ciudad de México), an integrated network of rail, bus, and aerial transit systems. The system includes the Mexico City Metro, the Metrobús bus rapid transit network, the Red de Transporte de Pasajeros (RTP) bus system, the Mexico City trolleybus system, the Mexico City Light Rail, and the Cablebús aerial lift system. Additional metropolitan transportation systems, including the Tren Suburbano commuter railway, the Mexibús BRT network, and the Mexicable aerial lift system, are operated independently by the State of Mexico but provide service to Greater Mexico City and interconnect with the Integrated Mobility System. Public transport services are operated by a mixture of public and private entities and are regulated and coordinated by the city's Secretariat of Mobility.

Despite the multiple public transport options, private cars are still widely used throughout the metropolitan area estimated at more than 4.5 million in 2016. Further, motorized public transportation is rated as bad and unsafe by its users, specifically for the high incidence of assaults and robberies as well as harassment, abuse, and sexual harassment of women. The systems are also considered by the users as inefficient, ineffective, and face problems such as the lack of regulation and official supervision.

== Rail transit ==
Mexico City has five rail transit systems: the Mexico City Metro, the El Insurgente intercity railway, the Tren Suburbano commuter railway, the line which connects to the Felipe Angeles International Airport, which in part shares the route with Tren Suburbano, and the Mexico City Light Rail. The Metro, El Insurgente and the Light Rail are part of the Mexico City Integrated Mobility System, while the Tren Suburbano operates independently of the system, although it serves the metropolitan area.

In addition, the government of the State of Mexico is developing a rapid transit system that will be operated by the state government and serve municipalities in the State of Mexico that form part of Greater Mexico City.

=== Mexico City Metro ===
Mexico City Metro logo

The Mexico City Metro is a 225.9-kilometre (140.4 mi) rapid transit system operated by Sistema de Transporte Colectivo, the largest metro system in Latin America. The first sections opened in 1969, and the network has expanded to 12 lines with 195 stations. The metro carries approximately 4.4 million passengers per day.

The system is heavily subsidized and has some of the lowest fares in the world, with each trip costing 5 pesos (approximately US$0.27) from 05:00 to midnight. Several stations display pre-Columbian artifacts and architectural remains discovered during construction. The stations are also distinguished by the use of icons and glyphs created for non-literate users, a system that has become associated with Mexico City's public transport network. The icons were developed using historical, linguistic, symbolic and geographic references.

=== Tren Suburbano ===

The Tren Suburbano is a suburban commuter rail line serving Greater Mexico City, including Tlalnepantla and Cuautitlán Izcalli. The system currently comprises a single line and operates independently of the city's Integrated Mobility System.

=== Tren Interurbano ===

The Tren Interurbano is a network of interurban commuter rail lines serving Greater Mexico City. The system comprises two lines: El Insurgente links Toluca and Mexico City, while the Felipe Ángeles connects Buenavista in Mexico City with Felipe Ángeles International Airport in the State of Mexico.

=== Mexico City Light Rail ===

The Mexico City Light Rail line is operated by Servicio de Transportes Eléctricos. The system comprises a single line continuing the service of Metro Line 2 along the Calzada de Tlalpan, terminating in Xochimilco in southern Mexico City. The line was built on the former streetcar right-of-way and has undergone extensive modernization.

== Bus transit ==
=== Metrobús ===

The city's first bus rapid transit line, the Metrobús, began operation in June 2005, along Avenida Insurgentes. More and more lines opened and as of 2025 there are 7 routes. As each line opened, the 'pesero' minibuses were removed from each route, in order to reduce pollution and commute times. As of mid-2017, there were 568 Metrobús buses. In late 2016 they transported an average of 1.1 million passengers daily.

=== Mexibús ===
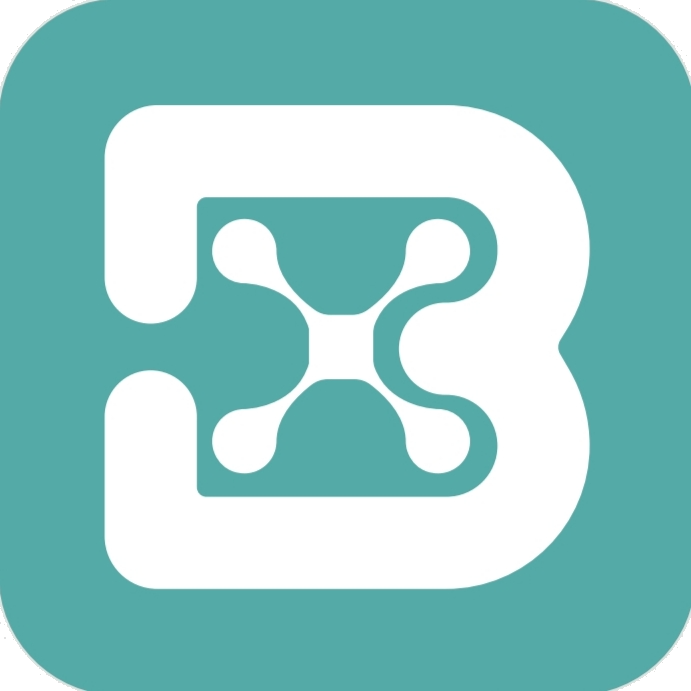

Mexibús provides 4 bus rapid transit lines connecting Metro Ciudad Azteca and Metro Pantitlán with Cuautitlán, Ecatepec and other suburban areas in the State of Mexico.

=== Red de Transportes de Pasajeros ===

City agency Red de Transporte de Pasajeros (RTP), formerly M1, operates various networks of large buses including regular, Ecobús, Circuito Bicentenario, Atenea, Express, school and night routes. In 2016, more bus routes were added to replace pesero routes. In 2016, the SVBUS express bus service was launched, with limited stops and utilizing the city's toll roads on the second-level of the Periférico ring road and Supervía Poniente and connecting Toreo/Cuatro Caminos with Santa Fe, San Jerónimo Lídice and Tepepan near Xochimilco in the southeast. Suburban buses also leave from the city's main intercity bus stations.

=== Trolleybuses ===

Historically, Mexico City has been serviced by a variety of electric transit systems, the Trolleybus is the main electric bus system comprising 14 routes which are typically long and structured lines. Trolleybus routes are characterised by having an exclusive lane on avenues, primarily Ejes Viales, with a counter-flow lane.

=== Pesero ===

Mexico City has an extensive network of privately operated concession bus routes, colloquially known as peseros. As of 2007, approximately 28,000 peseros carried about 60 percent of the city's public transport passengers.

In 2014, the city launched the "Bus Rapid Service", using mid-sized Mercedes-Benz Boxer buses carrying 75 to 85 passengers and replacing peseros on selected routes.

== Cable cars ==
Mexico City's cable car systems provide public transportation to hilly, densely populated areas and connect them with the rest of the city's transit network.

=== Cablebús ===

Cablebús is an aerial lift transit system serving the boroughs of Gustavo A. Madero and Iztapalapa. It is operated by Servicio de Transportes Eléctricos, which also operates the city's trolleybus and light rail systems.

The system has three lines: Line 1 runs between Indios Verdes and Cuautepec, Line 2 between Constitución de 1917 and Santa Marta, and Line 3 serves the Chapultepec area. Two additional lines are planned.

=== Mexicable ===
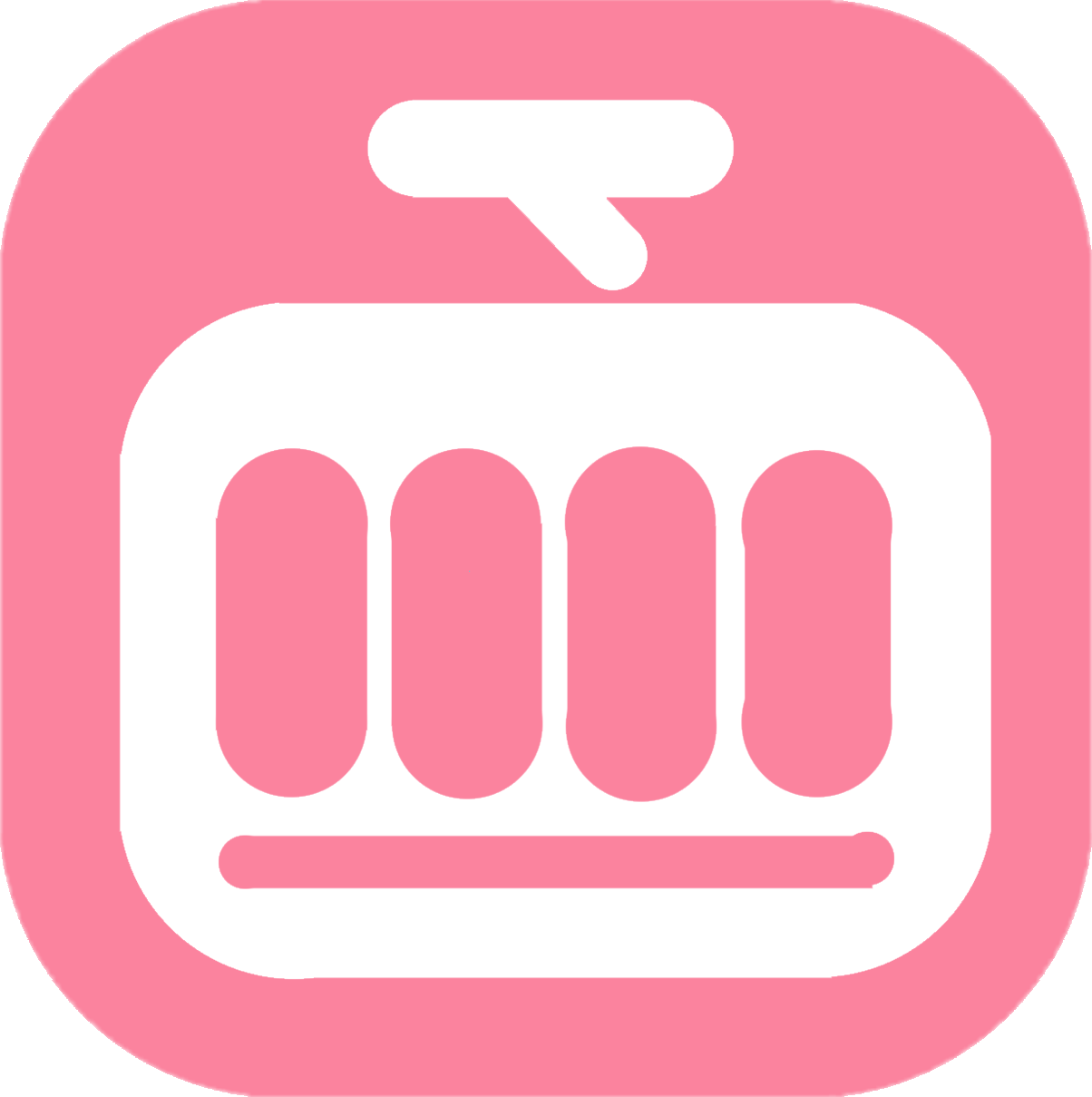

Mexicable is an aerial lift transit system serving Ecatepec de Morelos and Tlalnepantla de Baz in Greater Mexico City, with one station located in Mexico City proper.

The system has two lines. Line 1, opened in 2016, runs through the upper part of the Sierra de Guadalupe. Line 2, opened in 2023, runs between Indios Verdes and Hank González and connects with Mexico City Metro Line 3, Mexico City Metrobús Lines 1 and 7, Cablebús Line 1, and Mexicable Line 1.

== Cycling ==

Since the 2010s Mexico City has promoted the use of bicycles to reduce CO_{2} emissions, resulting in North America's second-largest bicycle sharing system, Ecobici, in which registered residents can get bicycles for 45 minutes with a pre-paid subscription of 300 pesos a year. As of May 2024, ECOBICI has reached over one-hundred million bike rides, and has 709 stations with 9,300 bicycles across an area stretching over 5 boroughs: Azcapotzalco, Benito Juárez, Coyoacán, Cuauhtémoc, and Miguel Hidalgo.

Bicycle stations are fully automatic, and users can access bicycles using their Transit Card or ECOBICI App. Bicycle-service users have access to several permanent dedicated bike paths/lanes/streets, including ones along Paseo de la Reforma and Avenida Chapultepec as well as one running 59 kilometers (37 miles) from Polanco to Fierro del Toro, which is located south of Cumbres del Ajusco National Park, near the Morelos state line. The city's initiative is inspired by forward thinking examples, such as Denmark's Copenhagenization.

== Roads ==
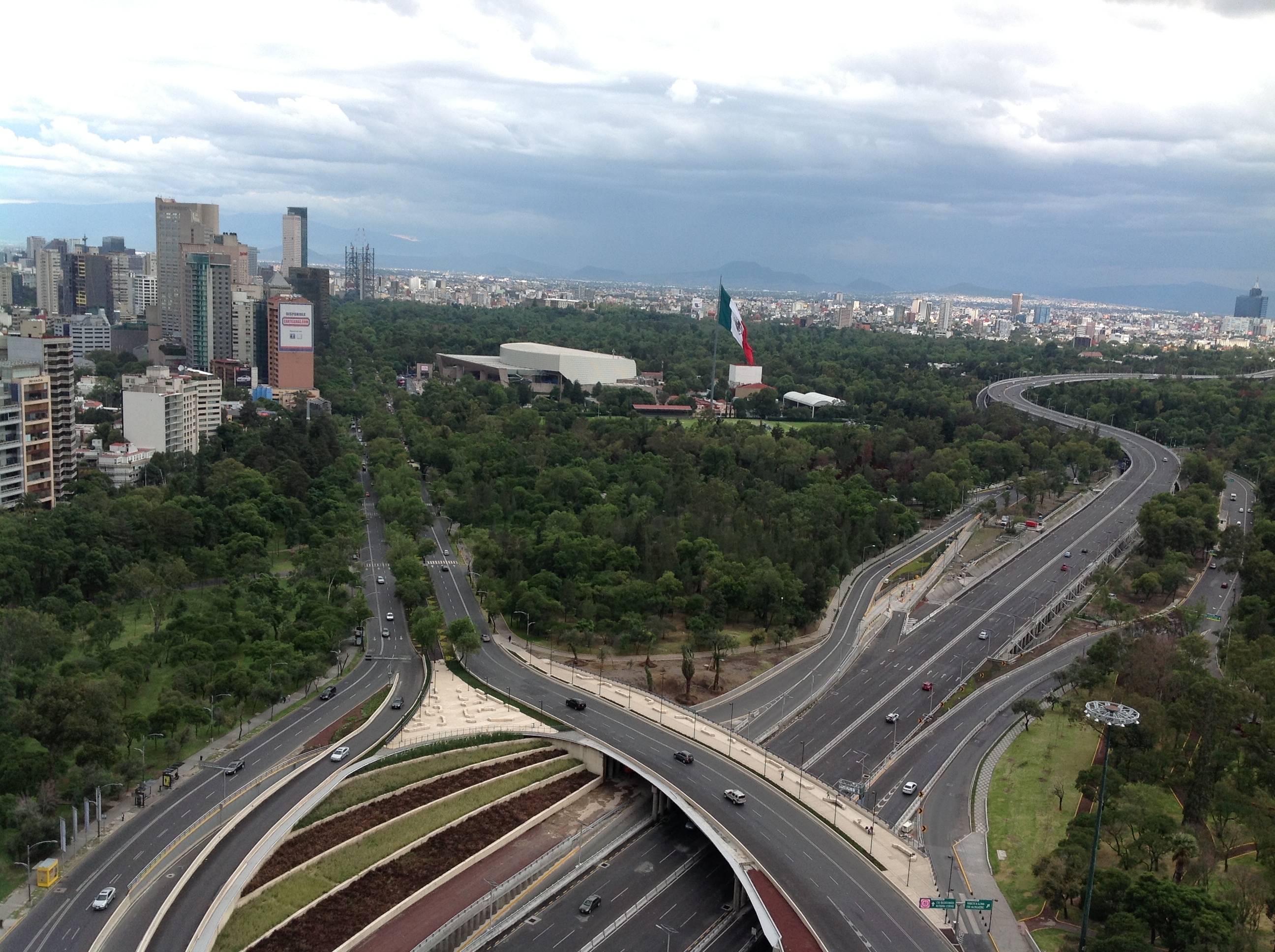
The Anillo Periférico and Paseo de la Reforma in Miguel Hidalgo

Greater Mexico City is connected through a private network of toll expressways to the nearby cities of Querétaro, Toluca, Cuernavaca, Pachuca and Puebla. Ring roads are the Circuito Interior (inner ring), Anillo Periférico; the Circuito Exterior Mexiquense ("State of Mexico outer loop") toll road skirting the northeastern and eastern edges of the metropolitan area, the Chamapa-La Venta toll road skirting the northwestern edge, and the Arco Norte completely bypassing the metropolitan area in an arc from west (Toluca) to north (Tula) to east (Puebla). A second level (where tolls are charged) of the Periférico, colloquially called the segundo piso ("second floor"), was officially opened in 2012, with sections still being completed. The Viaducto Miguel Alemán crosses the city east–west from Observatorio to the airport. In 2013 the Supervía Poniente opened, a toll road linking the new Santa Fe business district with southwestern Mexico City. Inside the city, ejes viales; high-volume, mostly one-way roads, cross the city from side to side in a vast numbered system.

In the late 1970s many arterial roads were redesigned as ejes viales; high-volume one-way roads that cross, in theory, Mexico City proper from side to side. The eje vial network is based on a quasi-Cartesian grid, with the ejes themselves being called Eje 1 Poniente, Eje Central, and Eje 1 Oriente, for example, for the north–south roads, and Eje 2 Sur and Eje 3 Norte, for example, for east–west roads. Ring roads are the Circuito Interior (inner ring), Anillo Periférico; the Circuito Exterior Mexiquense ("State of Mexico outer loop") toll road skirting the northeastern and eastern edges of the metropolitan area, the Chamapa-La Venta toll road skirting the northwestern edge, and the Arco Norte completely bypassing the metropolitan area in an arc from northwest (Atlacomulco) to north (Tula, Hidalgo) to east (Puebla). A second level (where tolls are charged) of the Periférico, colloquially called the segundo piso ("second floor"), was officially opened in 2012, with sections still being completed. The Viaducto Miguel Alemán crosses the city east–west from Observatorio to the airport. In 2013 the Supervía Poniente opened, a toll road linking the new Santa Fe business district with southwestern Mexico City.

There is an environmental program, called Hoy No Circula ("Today Does Not Run", or "One Day without a Car"), whereby vehicles that have not passed emissions testing are restricted from circulating on certain days according to the ending digit of their license plates; this in an attempt to cut down on pollution and traffic congestion. While in 2003, the program still restricted 40% of vehicles in the metropolitan area, with the adoption of stricter emissions standards in 2001 and 2006, in practice, these days most vehicles are exempt from the circulation restrictions as long as they pass regular emissions tests.

=== Parking ===
Street parking in urban neighborhoods is mostly controlled by the franeleros a.k.a. "viene vienes" (lit. "come on, come on"), who ask drivers for a fee to park. Double parking is common (with franeleros moving the cars as required), impeding on the available lanes for traffic to pass. In order to mitigate that and other problems and to raise revenue, 721 parking meters (as of October 2013), have been installed in the west-central neighborhoods Lomas de Chapultepec, Condesa, Roma, Polanco and Anzures, in operation from 8 AM to 8 PM on weekdays and charging a rate of 2 pesos per 15 minutes, with offenders' cars booted, costing about 500 pesos to remove. 30 percent of the monthly 16 million-peso (as of October 2013) income from the parking-meter system (named "ecoParq") is earmarked for neighborhood improvements. The granting of the license for all zones exclusively to a new company without experience in operating parking meters, Operadora de Estacionamientos Bicentenario, has generated controversy.

== Airports ==
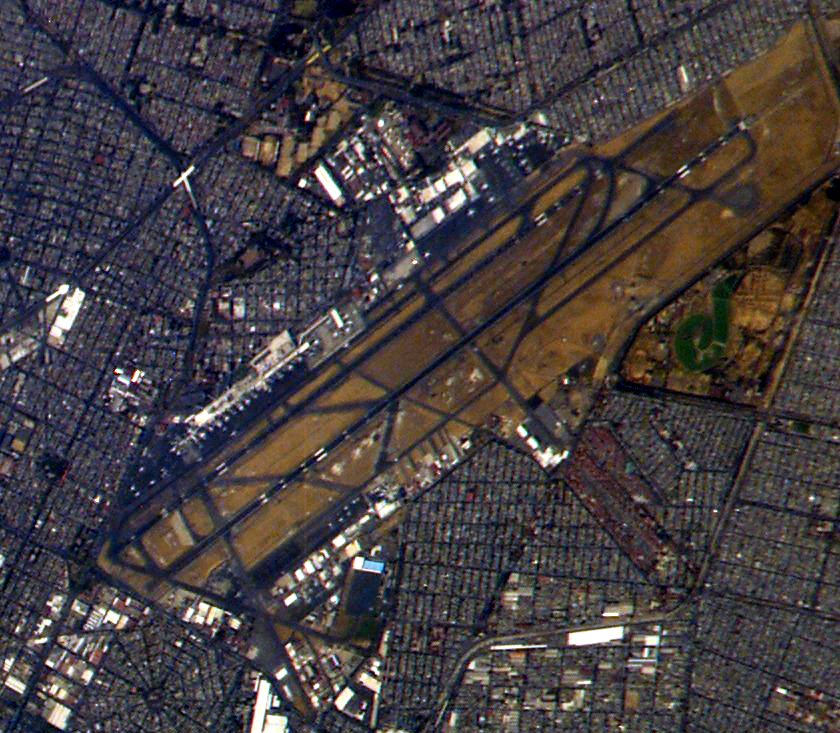
Mexico City International Airport

Mexico City International Airport is Mexico City's primary airport (IATA Airport Code: MEX). It is the busiest airport in Latin America with regular (daily) flights to North America, mainland Mexico, Central America and the Caribbean, South America, Europe and Asia. In 2019, it was used by over 50 million passengers. The traffic exceeds the current capacity of the airport, which has historically centralized the majority of air traffic in the country. Aeroméxico (Skyteam) is based at this airport, and has codeshare agreements with non-Mexican airlines that span the entire globe. The airport is also a hub for Volaris, VivaAerobus and Aeromar. It was a hub for Mexicana de Aviacion and Interjet in the past. Mexico City International Airport has two terminals, which are serviced by the Aerotrén, a self-driving people mover system.

Felipe Ángeles International Airport (IATA Airport Code: NLU) is Mexico City's secondary airport. The airport opened in 2022, rebuilt from the former Santa Lucía Air Force Base. It is located in Zumpango, State of Mexico, 48.8 kilometres (30 mi) north-northeast of the historic center of Mexico City by car.. In 2026, rail service started from Buenavista Station in downtown Mexico City taking around 45 minutes from Buenavista to the airport.

Other airports include the neighboring airports at Toluca, State of Mexico (IATA: TLC), Querétaro City, Querétaro (IATA: QRO), Puebla City, Puebla (IATA: PBC), and Cuernavaca, Morelos (IATA: CVJ).

== See also ==
- Mexico City
- Hoy No Circula
- Rickshaws in Mexico City
- Streetcars in Mexico City
- Trajineras
