= Mujer chimenea =

Artwork in Mexico City

- Partial view of the artwork
- Artist: Gabriel Macotela
- Year: 2006
- Medium: Copper and concrete
- Dimensions: 100 m (3,900 in)
- Location: Mexico City; 19°23′8.6″N 99°11′38.15″W
- Owner: Grupo Copri

Mujer chimenea, officially Mujer chimenea, homenaje a Efraín Huerta (Spanish for "Chimney Woman, Homage to Efraín Huerta") is an outdoor copper-and-concrete sculpture in Mexico City. Designed by Gabriel Macotela, it is a 100-meter (330 ft) tall artwork installed near Anillo Periférico and Avenida San Antonio, Mexico City. It was inaugurated in 2006 and is located inside a private residential complex. It was dedicated to Efraín Huerta, a Mexican poet.

== History and installation ==
Designed by Gabriel Macotela, Mujer chimenea is a copper sculpture installed on a repurposed old concrete industrial chimney. The area was previously owned by Cementos Tolteca (later acquired by Cemex), in a factory that was used until 1986 and later demolished. The site was redeveloped as Parque San Antonio, a private residential complex owned by Grupo Copri and located at Calle Toltecas 166, near Anillo Periférico and Avenida San Antonio, in Álvaro Obregón, southwestern Mexico City.

The idea of turning the disused chimney into an artwork came from art promoter Isaac Masri, who presented it to the then-head of government, Andrés Manuel López Obrador. Macotela accepted on the condition that he would receive no payment. The original plan included additional amenities such as "an artificial lake, a park, an outdoor theater, and a school of arts and crafts", but the complex's owner objected.

Mujer chimenea became a 100-meter (330 ft) tall artwork covered with copper elements. Its height consists of a 92-meter (302 ft) chimney, a 6-meter (20 ft) finial, and a 2-meter (6 ft 7 in) lightning rod. The project drew on engineering expertise from both National Autonomous University of Mexico (UNAM) and National Polytechnic Institute (IPN) engineers, more than 150 people, and 15 months of work. 3,400 square meters (37,000 sq ft) of copper were used to create it, whose weight totaled 85 metric tons (84 long tons; 94 short tons). Mujer chimenea cost MX$22 million, shared between the property owner, the city government, and private donations, which contributed MX$10 million, MX$10 million, and MX$2 million, respectively. The government was involved because the land was transferred to Grupo Copri in exchange for its construction of bridges along Eje 5 Poniente.

The sculpture was inaugurated on 3 December 2006 by López Obrador interim successor, Alejandro Encinas as one of the final acts of his administration. It was dedicated to Efraín Huerta, a Mexican poet. It became the tallest monument in the city until 2012, when Estela de Luz opened.

Access restrictions at the complex limit viewing of Mujer chimenea to the exterior, although it can be seen from the second level of Periférico and an adjacent public park. In discussing the residential development, Macotela criticized the apartments, speaking about his perceived construction defects, unreliable water supply and inadequate sound insulation between apartments.

== See also ==
- Distribuidor Vial San Antonio
