= Chilango (magazine) =

Mexican entertainment and events magazine

Chilango is a monthly entertainment Mexican magazine launched in 2003 in Mexico City.

== History ==
The magazine Chilango was launched by Mexican press group Grupo Expansión (then owner of magazines Expansión and Quien) in November 2003 as a Mexican equivalent to Time Out. In the early 21st century, Chilango became an accepted demonym for people from Mexico City. The self-acceptance of the term lead to the publication of the magazine as a way to subvert prejudices that people from the inner states of Mexico had about chilangos, originally created and intended by them as an offensive name.

In 2014, the businessman César Pérez Barnes bought Grupo Expánsion and Chilango from Time Inc.

In 2017, Grupo Expánsion was sold again, to the advertising company Cinco M Dos owned by Édgar Farah, but the magazine Chilango had been sold separately to Gustavo Guzmán, also owner of the magazine Más por Más.

In 2023, the magazine launched its own radio station in Mexico City, Radio Chilango. The radio broadcasts on regular FM waves and online. The concession of the 105.3 MHz frequency (by Eduardo Henkel) came with the rights for the magazine to broadcast television content and provide telecommunication services.

== Description ==
The magazine is owned and managed by the branded content agency Capital Digital (owner of Pictoline, UnoCero, Sopitas, Más por más). Sections of the magazine include:

- DFnitivo: Word play with the Spanish pronunciation of DF, the Mexican Federal District or Distrito Federal. A how-to style section intended as a parody of weird things that happen in the city, such as the unfinished (called surreal) Distribuidor Vial freeway over Río Becerra or the bottles filled with water to keep away dogs and other animals from invading gardens. Most of it is real but the logic of the situation is the questioned by the article.
- Chilangoñol: A RAE parody in which the Mexican Spanish (focused in Mexico City slang) is explained, such as the words "onda", "equis" (fresa slang), "chingar" (considered offensive by some).
- Aka el DF: Social and news sections parody ("aka" comes from "acá", but it's spelled with "k" by some). However, it's all factual.
- El pinche gringo: Translated as The fucking gringo, and disappeared by 2007, it was an unusual article completely in English supposedly written by an American criticising Mexico City and its way of life.
- DFondo: The collection of cover full-length articles.

== Motto ==
During its first years, the magazine's slogan was a spoof of the racist "haz patria y mata un chilango" (perform patriotism and kill a chilango), marked as "haz patria y ama a un chilango" (perform patriotism and love a chilango). Later issues included new phrases such as "la ciudad que vale la pena vivir" (the worthy city to live) or "haz patria y levantamiento de tarro olímpico" (perform patriotism and olympic beer mug lifting).
