= Guía Roji =

Guía Roji (Roji's Guides) is a cartography company based in Mexico City.

Guía Roji was created in 1928 by Joaquín Palacios Roji Lara. Since that year, the characteristic cover color of the map books has been red.

The first maps showed the reduced size of Mexico City in the 1920s. In the late 1960s, the number of maps began to increase considerably. In 1966 there were about 10, but in 1988 the number rose up to 90. However, as the city has kept constantly growing, suburban areas in the surrounding State of Mexico have added to the maps.

Many modern Guía Roji editions include a plastic flat magnifying glass, entire Metro networks for Mexico City and Monterrey, and, for the Mexico City edition, a folding map containing the Distribuidor Vial and the Centro Histórico.

== See also ==
- Instituto Nacional de Estadística y Geografía
