= Viaducto Bicentenario =

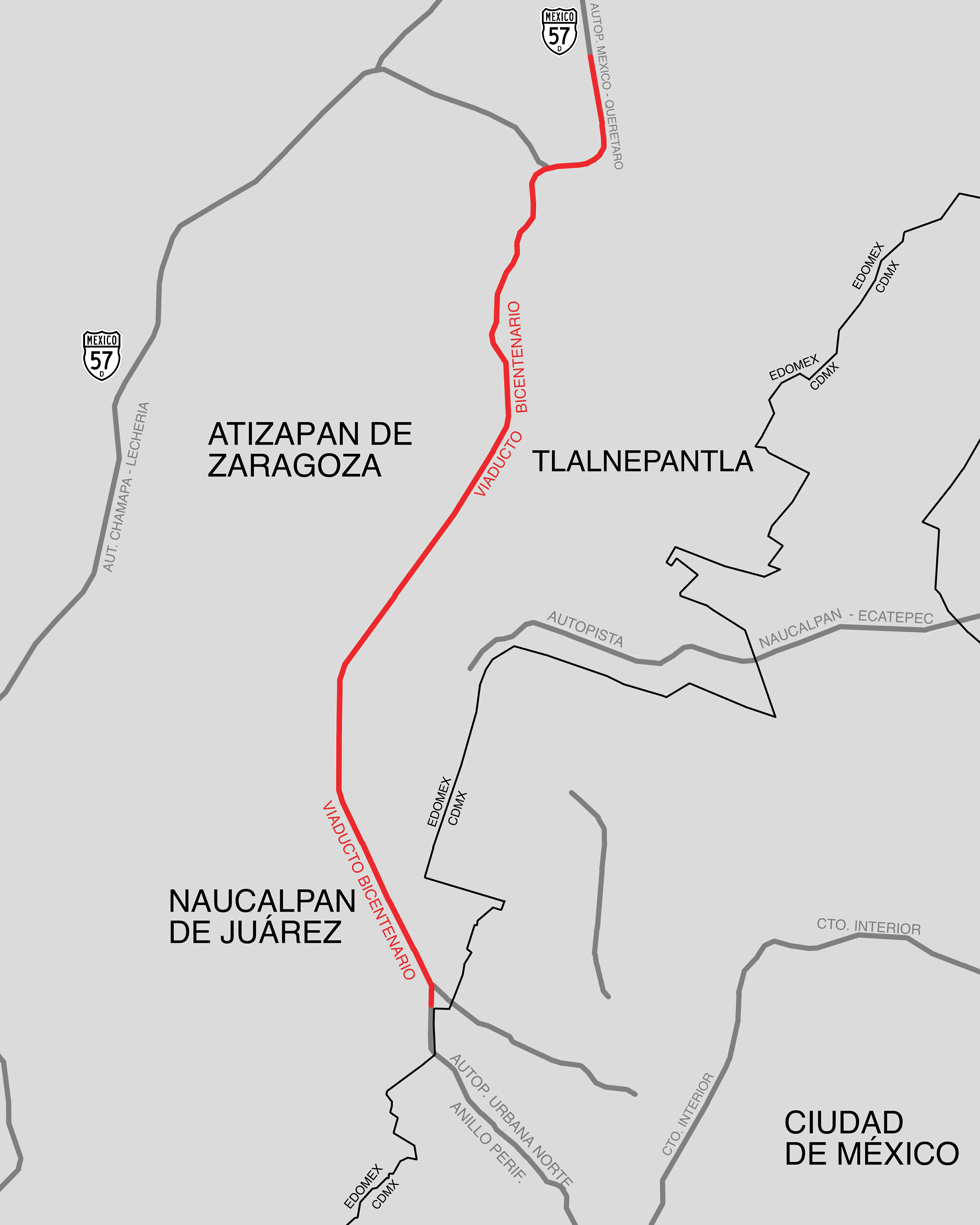
- Viaducto Bicentenario map

Route information
- Maintained by Aleatica Concessionaire
- History: September 2009 (First section); September 2010 (Second section); November 2010 (Third section)
- Restrictions: Reversible lanes at different times

Major junctions
- North end: Autopista México - Querétaro
- South end: Toreo de Cuatro Caminos (continues as Autopista Urbana Norte)

Location
- Country: Mexico

Highway system
- Transportation in Mexico City; Roads

The Viaducto Bicentenario (English: Bicentennial Viaduct) is an elevated toll highway connecting several municipalities in the Greater Mexico City metropolitan area. Its route runs from the Autopista Mexico-Querétaro in Tepalcapa to Toreo de Cuatro Caminos, continuing as the Autopista Urbana Norte (Northern Urban Highway). The complete project was planned to extend 32 kilometers to the town of Tepotzotlán.

== History ==
On October 23, 2007, during Enrique Peña Nieto's governorship of the State of Mexico, the Viaducto Bicentenario project was put out to public tender. On April 21, 2008, the contract was awarded to OHL Concesiones México (later renamed Aleatica). The original budget and cost for construction were around 6.5 billion pesos of private investment. Initially, major modifications were planned in front of the Torres de Satélite, but due to pressure from civil associations seeking to preserve the view of the artistic monument, the viaduct was built at ground level in that section.

The project was not inaugurated in its entirety, but rather opened in phases:

• Section from Toreo Cuatro Caminos to Lomas Verdes (4 kilometers) on September 21, 2009

• Section from Lomas Verdes to Lago de Guadalupe (11 kilometers) on September 2, 2010

• Section from Lago de Guadalupe to Tepalcapa (6 kilometers) on November 23, 2010

== Characteristics ==
Since its inauguration, it was stipulated that toll collection would be 100% electronic via a prepaid card (TAG). It features a reversible lane system, which operates from north to south in the mornings to alleviate traffic towards Mexico City, and from south to north in the afternoon and evening.

== Controversies ==
In 2024, the Attorney General's Office (FGR) stated that the concession granted to OHL in 2008 was completely illegal. The legal argument is that the Viaducto Bicentenario is built almost entirely over the Autopista México-Querétaro, which is a federal highway. According to the FGR and complaints filed by various lawyers, the State of Mexico did not have the constitutional authority to grant a concession for a national asset without the explicit authorization of the then-Federal Ministry of Communications and Transportation. As a result, Aleatica's toll collection has been criminally charged as the crime of illegal exploitation of a national asset.

In the Tepalcapa area, there are unfinished columns of the future stage of the Bicentennial viaduct towards Tepotzotlán, after 12 years.

== See also ==
- Anillo Periférico
- Transportation in Mexico City
