= Avenida Constituyentes =

Avenue in Mexico City

Avenida Constituyentes is an avenue running east/west in western Mexico City. Serving as the principal access road to the Santa Fe business district through the Toluca highway, it frequently experiences traffic jams. It is named in honor of the creators of the Constitution of Mexico. The avenue runs through Álvaro Obregón and Miguel Hidalgo districts. The avenue ends in the crossing with Circuito Interior.

== Attractions ==
Chapultepec Park, Casa Luis Barragán, Papalote Museo del Niño and Museo de Historia Natural are adjacent to the boulevard.

== Neighborhoods ==
- San Miguel Chapultepec
- Daniel Garza
- Observatorio
- América
- Las Américas
- Las Palmas
- Belén de las Flores
- Lomas Altas
- Industrias Militares de Sedena
- Lomas de Santa Fe

== Metro ==
Constituyentes metro station is a station on Line 7 of the Mexico City Metro on the western outskirts of the city center. The station's icon shows a quill, a pot of ink and a book, in reference to the Mexican constitutions of 1824, 1857 and 1917. Constituyentes serves the San Miguel Chapultepec and Ampliación Daniel Garza neighborhoods, in the Miguel Hidalgo borough.

== See also ==
- Avenida Álvaro Obregón
- Paseo de la Reforma
- Avenida de los Insurgentes
