= Supervía Poniente =

Toll highway in Mexico City

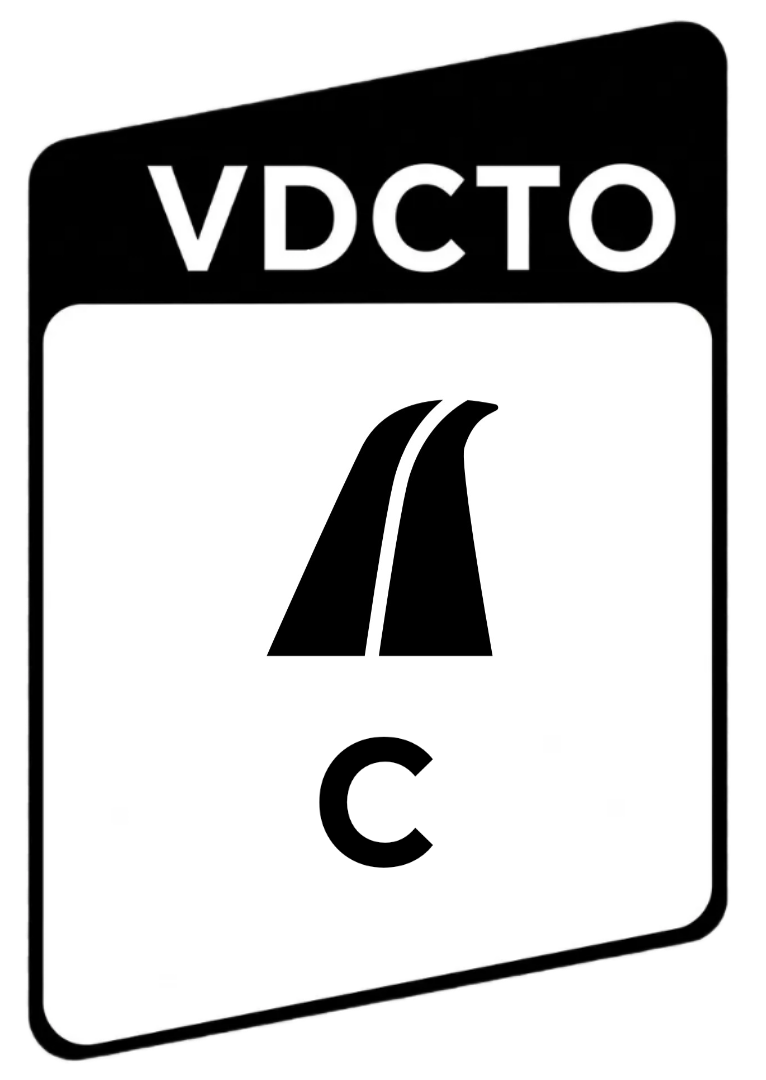
Supervía Poniente
- Autopista Urbana Poniente
- Supervía Poniente highlighted in red

Route information
- Maintained by Aleatica Consecionaria
- Length: 7.2 km (4.5 mi)
- Existed: October 4, 2012 (Centenario–Las Águilas); ~2013 (Las Águilas–Las Torres); June 15, 2013 (Las Torres–Luis Cabrera); July 14, 2013 (Viaducto Luis Cabrera)–present

Major junctions
- North end: Avenida Centenario
- Calzada de Las Águilas; Avenida Las Torres; Avenida Luis Cabrera
- South end: Anillo Periférico / Autopista Urbana Sur

Location
- Country: Mexico
- Municipalities: Álvaro Obregón; Magdalena Contreras

Highway system
- Roads in Mexico City

Secondary characteristics
- Identifier: VDCTO C (Viaducto C)
- Speed limit
- Number of lanes: 3 (2 in some sections)
- Toll payment: Electronic (TAG)
- Reversible lanes: Yes
- Maintained by: Controladora Vía Rápida Poetas
- Concessionaire: Aleatica
- Toll rate: 71MX$

The Supervía Poniente, officially named Autopista Urbana Poniente (English: Western Urban Tollway), is a short urban toll highway located in the western part of Mexico City. With a length of 7.2 km, it connects the Santa Fe area—via the Puentes de los Poetas and Avenida Centenario—with the Anillo Periférico Sur, ending in an elevated viaduct over Avenida Luis Cabrera that links with the Luis Cabrera Elevated Roadway and the Autopista Urbana Sur.

The road traverses the complex topography of western Mexico City through tunnels and bridges that cross urban ravines, with intermediate access points at Calzada de las Águilas and Avenida Las Torres. It was built in three stages: the first opened on October 4, 2012, and the third and final stage on June 15, 2013. Since 2018, it has been operated by Aleatica under a 30-year concession, and its toll rate for a full trip in 2025 is $71 MXN.

== History ==
The Supervía Poniente project emerged from an initiative of the then-Government of the Federal District to build an expressway connecting the Mexico-Toluca Highway with the Periférico Sur. The Santa Fe area, despite concentrating a high density of offices and shopping centers, lacked a direct connection to the south and east of the city. The project was modified up to three times to minimize potential environmental damage.

=== Inaugurations ===
The highway was planned in three sections: Centenario–Las Águilas, Las Águilas–Las Torres, and Las Torres–Luis Cabrera.

On October 4, 2012, Marcelo Ebrard inaugurated the first 1.9 km section, from Centenario to Las Águilas, with an investment of one billion pesos. During its first 15 days, its use was free. The exact opening date of the second section (Las Águilas–Las Torres) was not precisely documented by the press, but it opened in the following months. The third and final section, from Las Torres to Luis Cabrera, was inaugurated on June 15, 2013, completing the road.

A month later, on July 14, 2013, the then-Government of the Federal District inaugurated the Luis Cabrera Elevated Viaduct as a complementary toll-free public work, consolidating the connection with the Anillo Periférico and the Autopista Urbana Sur.

== Route ==
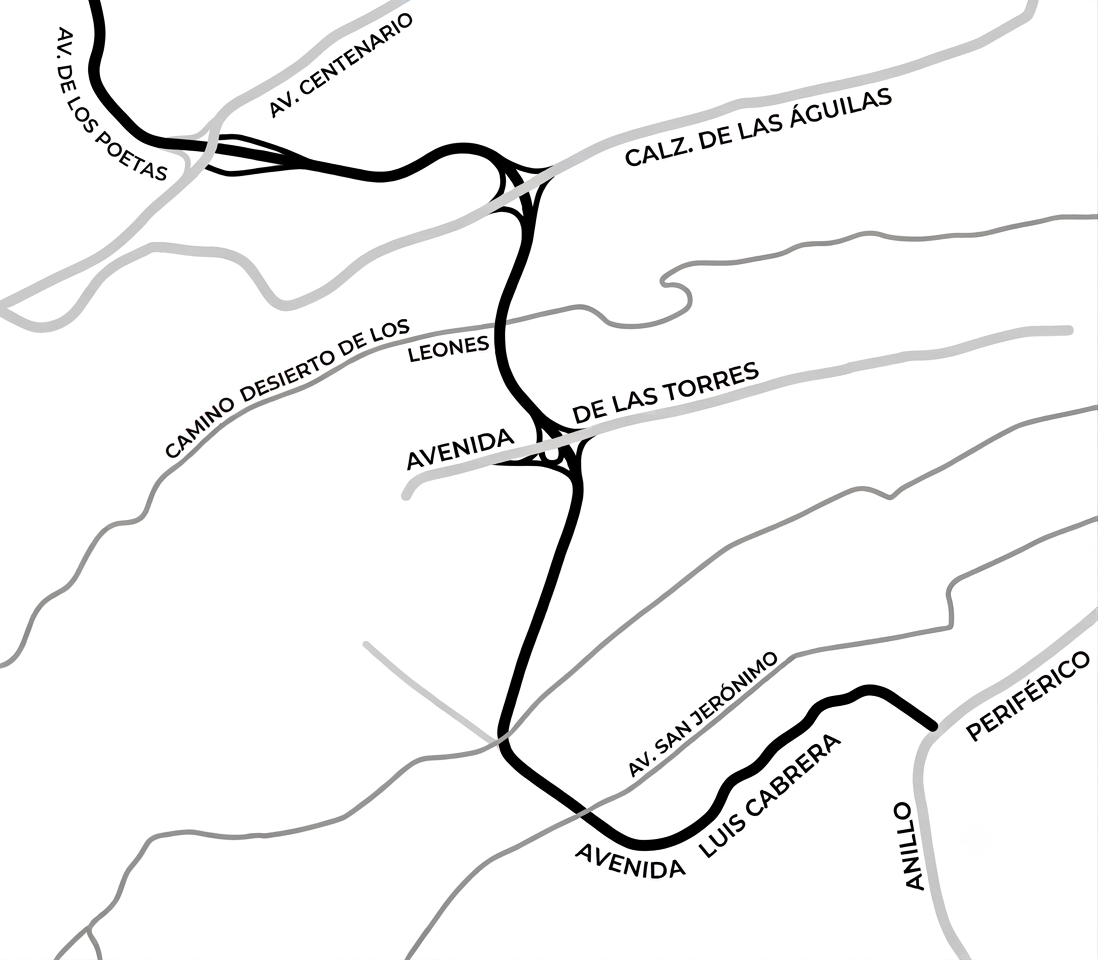
Graphic map of the Supervía Poniente, highlighting connected and nearby routes

At its northwestern end, the road begins as a continuation of Avenida de los Poetas, from its intersection with Avenida Centenario. From this point, the route enters the Parque Tarango area and crosses the Puente Colorado stream via elevated viaducts, reaching Calzada de las Águilas near the park of the same name.

After passing Calzada de las Águilas and crossing the San Ángel Inn stream, the highway begins its underground section, entering a first tunnel that passes under Calzada Desierto de los Leones. The road briefly emerges near Universidad Anáhuac (South Campus) before almost immediately entering a second tunnel beneath Avenida de las Torres, which includes exits to the avenue itself.

Subsequently, the route continues underground beneath the La Loma Ecological and Recreational Park. The highway comes out into the open to cross the La Malinche ravine and is confined again in a final tunnel under the La Malinche neighborhood. Finally, the road emerges at Avenida Luis Cabrera.

In its final stretch, after crossing Avenida San Jerónimo, the infrastructure becomes the Viaducto Elevado Luis Cabrera, a viaduct that allows direct interconnection with the Anillo Periférico (northbound) and facilitates continuous traffic flow towards the Autopista Urbana Sur (southbound).

=== Importance ===
The Supervía Poniente plays a key role in the mobility of western Mexico City, connecting the Santa Fe business district — one of the most important financial and commercial hubs in Latin America — with the rest of the city. Before its inauguration, residents of the Álvaro Obregón and Magdalena Contreras boroughs faced severe congestion on surface roads such as Avenida de los Poetas and Camino al Desierto de los Leones. The expressway reduced travel times between Santa Fe and the Anillo Periférico from over 40 minutes to approximately 10 minutes under normal traffic conditions. It also provides a direct connection to the Autopista Urbana Sur, integrating it into the broader urban toll highway network of Mexico City.

== Major intersections ==
The following table shows the connections and features along the route, as well as its kilometric points (there are TAG or electronic toll booths along the road):

State	Municipality	mi	km	Exit	Destinations	Notes
Mexico City	Álvaro Obregón	6.2	10	01	Avenida Centenario	Western terminus; highway continues west as Avenida de Los Poetas to Santa Fe
Mexico City	Álvaro Obregón	6.8	11	02	Calzada de Las Águilas	Toll exit.
Mexico City	Álvaro Obregón	7.5	12		Tunnel under Camino Desierto de Los Leones	
Mexico City	Álvaro Obregón	8.1	13	03	Avenida de Las Torres	Toll exit.
Mexico City	Álvaro Obregón	8.4	13.5		Tunnel under La Loma Ecological and Recreational Park	
Mexico City	Magdalena Contreras	8.7	14		Tunnel under La Malinche neighborhood	
Mexico City	Magdalena Contreras	9.3	15	04	Avenida Luis Cabrera	Electronic point of sale, start of Viaducto Elevado Luis Cabrera
Mexico City	Magdalena Contreras	10.6	17		Connection with Anillo Periférico / Autopista Urbana Sur	Fully elevated intersection
1.000 mi = 1.609 km; 1.000 km = 0.621 mi Indicates toll road or toll collection point

== Public transport ==
Currently, two routes of the Red de Transporte de Pasajeros (RTP) operate on the highway, although they do not have stops along the route:

- Route 34-B — Connects Parque de la Bombilla (near Miguel Ángel de Quevedo metro station) with the Santa Fe Shopping Center, operating from 05:00 to 23:00 hours every day of the week, with a fare of $5 MXN.
- Route 300-B — Connects Paseos Acoxpa Shopping Center (Coapa area) with UAM Cuajimalpa, operating on weekdays from 06:00 to 21:48 hours.

== Controversies ==
Since its announcement, the project generated deep division among citizens. The first affected were the residents of the La Malinche neighborhood, who argued that only 0.4% of the population would benefit from the public work, and that it mainly served the interests of the corporate sectors in Santa Fe. They formed the Frente No a la Supervía (No to the Supervía Front) and resorted to marches, sit-ins, and legal appeals to try to stop the construction.

For the construction of the underground section, the then-Government of the Federal District expropriated 126 properties: 51 in the La Malinche neighborhood (Magdalena Contreras borough) and 75 in the Álvaro Obregón borough. The expropriation decrees were published in the Official Journal of the Federation in April 2010 using illegible technical coordinates for those affected, who reported not having received clear information regarding which properties were included in the expropriation.

Regarding the environmental impact, the route of the project crossed ecological reserves and urban ravines, which meant the logging of vegetation in conservation areas, sparking complaints from both neighbors and environmental authorities.

On January 1, 2011, in the early hours of the morning, the Government of the Federal District occupied the 51 expropriated properties in La Malinche through the use of public force, which triggered a series of marches and protests by neighbors and civil organizations.
