= Santa Fe de Mexico (pueblo hospital) =

Geography
- Location: Santa Fé, delegación of Álvaro Obregón, Mexico City, Mexico

History
- Opened: 1532

Links
- Lists: Hospitals in Mexico

Santa Fé de México was a Pueblo Hospital founded by Vasco de Quiroga in 1532. Its ruins are located in the town of Santa Fé in the delegación of Álvaro Obregón in western Mexico City.

== Origins ==
In 1530 the missionary priest and confessor to the Spanish king's Vasco de Quiroga, arrived in the capital of New Spain in order to be part of the Viceroyalty of the government through the Second Audience as auditor, this experiment Fees graduate firsthand the neglect and exposure to indigenous people lived, especially Mexica that most had left children orphaned and wives widowed.

As Utopia based on the book of Thomas More organized a hospital to remedy the evils they suffered, at that time was understood as a charity hospital that included protection, culture, health and religion. To which took Acaxúchitl a hill known as "Flor de Caña" half a league from the town of Tacubaya to the west of Mexico City.

In 1532 the construction began of various buildings that formed the Pueblo-Hospital of Santa Fe. It is said Vasco de Quiroga paid for the lands but not found any trace of the transaction, so if it is documented is that Hernán Cortés do not request any of the land that formed although they were in the middle of its Marquisate of the Valley of Oaxaca. The town was formally established by the Viceroy Antonio de Mendoza in 1537 for which sends delimit its territory and separated from the main towns around him like San Pedro Cuajimalpa, Santa Lucia and Tacubaya.

The town developed around a church whose sides were built buildings that housed medical services, community kitchen and living quarters for religious as well as separate houses for the natives by gender either alone or as families. Other buildings were dedicated to teaching jobs, such as wrought was unknown among the Mexica. Taught in the church's new Christian faith which was led initially by the Augustinian Fray Alonso de Borja and then with the laws of regularization by secular clergy. This thriving hospital with the people round about but the trips of its founder to the current state of Michoacan and his appointment as Bishop of that in 1538 allowed him to repeat in other parts of the state of Santa Fe experience, which led him to be known as a benefactor of the region and which is known as Tata Vasco "Papa Vasco", these people spread to New Mexico, its founder died in 1565 in Pátzcuaro Michoacán, after ensuring that they were give special tax treatment to their hospitals and the inhabitants thereof.

These people were heading in a semi-independent viceroy through royal ordinances were valid until the eighteenth century, administrative charges were the Mayor as a civilian representative, the priest-rector and administrator of the religious aspect of the Stewards in charge works and festivals, its patron saint was the Assumption of Mary on August 15.

In 1700 there were only mentions that the ruins of the hospital which was over by internal disputes and the laws of regularization imposed in the viceroyalty. Around mentioned lived some Indians living from grazing and agriculture that fed with various waterholes of the area in 1538 on the ruins of the Tlaxpana aqueduct that supplied water to the mills and Tacubaya Mexico City. Which was then grown with water from the Desierto de los Leones in 1782.

In colonial times the town was bypassed, to go to Toluca, so there was a burgeoning commercial industry. Since the independence, after the Battle of Monte de las Cruces was one of the points to Hidalgo's troops arriving from Cuajimalpa, but its proximity to Tacubaya made their decision impractical permanent.

Independence continued to be accomplished one step at Toluca, but he remodeled the church of Santa Fe for the benefit of the residents, in 1838 prior to U.S. involvement is installed in the ravine north of town a gunpowder factory for the federal government, which is still operational and it gave rise to Military Camp 1F. Intervention in the factory was taken by the invaders and destroyed their machinery, in 1860 sold the equipment to an individual who would use it as spare parts but in 1865 the government of Maximilian recovers this is until 1873 with the Gen. Porfirio Díaz that begins the reconstruction of "House" Matas "which conclude on May 7, 1900, and that you can still see at the bottom of the ravine through which the river passes Tacubaya.

In the aftermath of the 1857 constitution and the rule of Santa Fe term is designated head of the Prefecture of the same name which is short as they are separated several villages in its territory of the municipalities forming Cuajimalpa, Joplin, Mixcoac, San Angelo and Santa Fe, being the head of the prefecture in the city of Tacubaya.

In the Porfiriato was a playground for rich families living in Tacubaya, so it was electrified along with Tacubaya in 1880 was built a railway branch Tacubaya Mexico City, which was then continued by the royal road to Toluca to La Venta in Cuajimalpa, this service was from the beginning with machines of electric motors, so their populations increase rapidly. In 1903 the municipality of Santa Fe disappears and joins the San Angel which has not been disconnected yet.

In the revolution of its proximity to the forest and landscapes Count Cuajimalpa Zapatistas fought mainly caused the depopulation of the people so that by the end of the fight Santa Fe was a village of a few houses with much land and few owners.

In the 1940s the mining of construction materials began in the hills north of the town which belonged mostly to neighboring Cuajimalpa, where last time the gap was that created the garbage dump of Mexico City, which was open until the late 1980s when the construction of real estate development started City Santa Fe, which has been appropriating the name Santa Fe.

In the 1960s and 1970s the migration of city dwellers and other states started to the land of the people who remained empty as are mainly bought it invaded. These people at first tried to inhabit areas of mines, but the shocks were so strong with the owners who eventually settled in the hills and canyons surrounding them that today many streets give a steep slope that scare.

At this time the organized crime groups and gangs were well known and feared as the Panchitos which end up creating governments that control the area and eventually make them part of the system of city government. In the 1990s with the development of Santa Fe City, Santa Fe started to become an area of services and resources for development, since many temporary and permanent jobs created are enjoyed by residents today continuously keeping much of its bad reputation but this turning into a mid-level urban core.
