= Santa Fe, Mexico City =

- Neighborhood of Mexico City
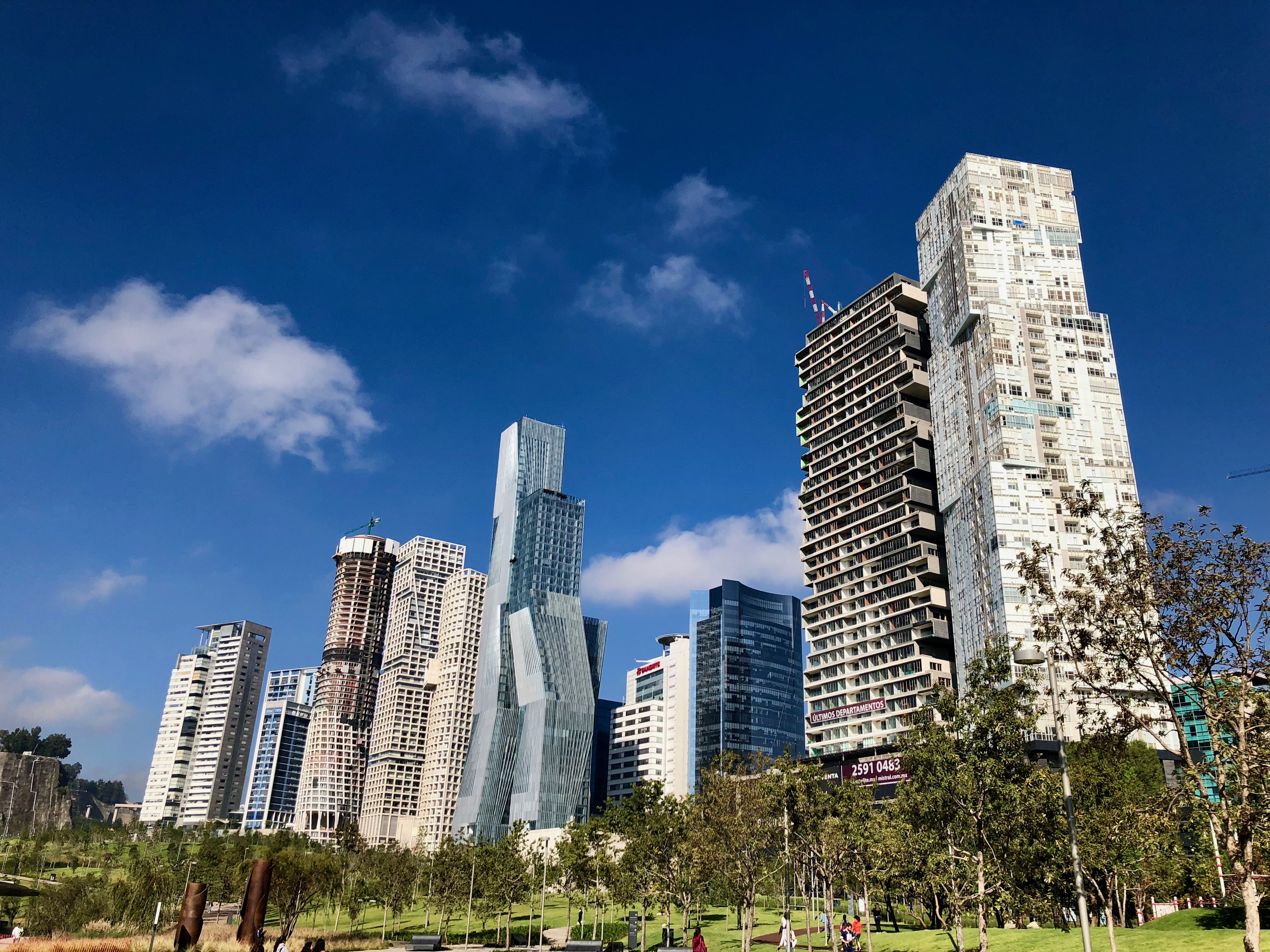
- View of Santa Fe from La Mexicana Park

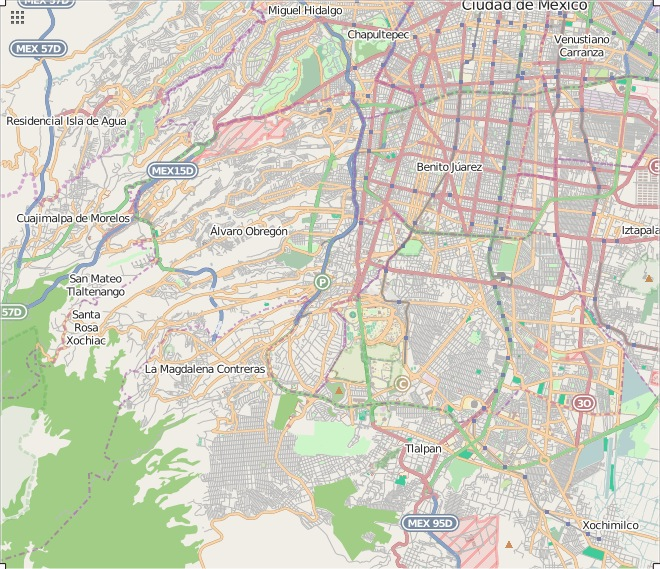
- Location within Mexico City Southwest
- Coordinates: 19.367596°N 99.259275°W
- Country: Mexico
- Federative Entity: Mexico City
- Boroughs: Álvaro Obregón; Cuajimalpa

Population (2011)
  - Total: 35,000

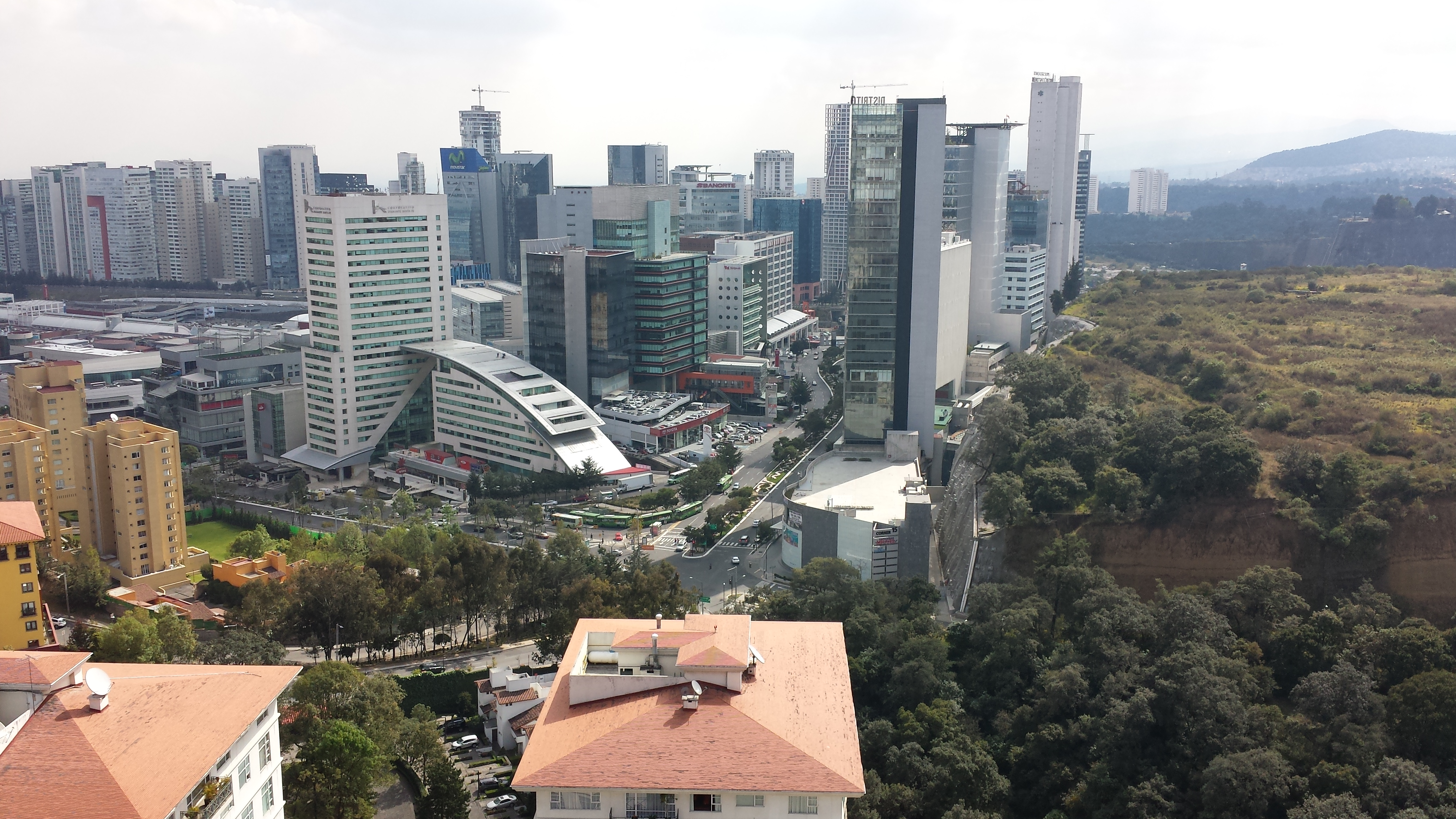
One of the entrances into Santa Fe

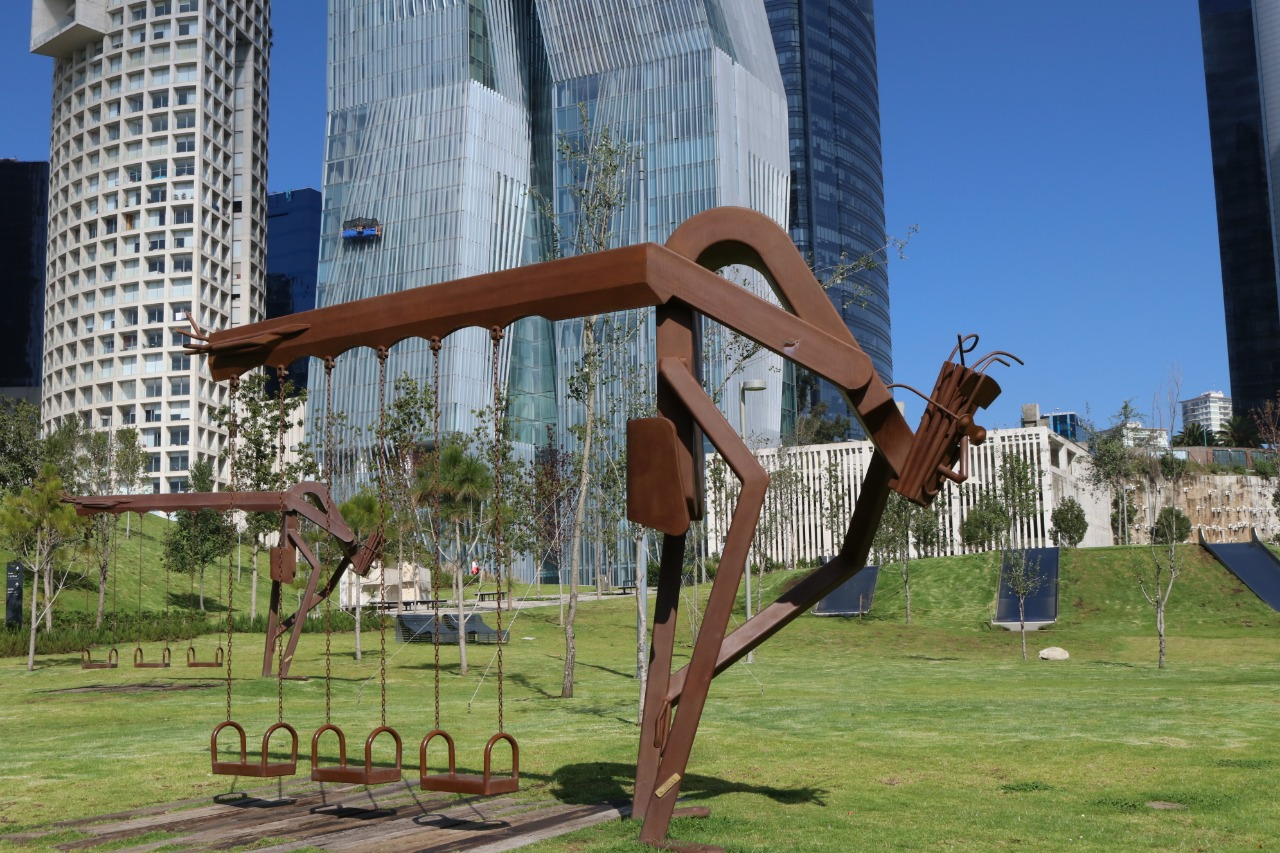
Santa Fe from La Mexicana Park

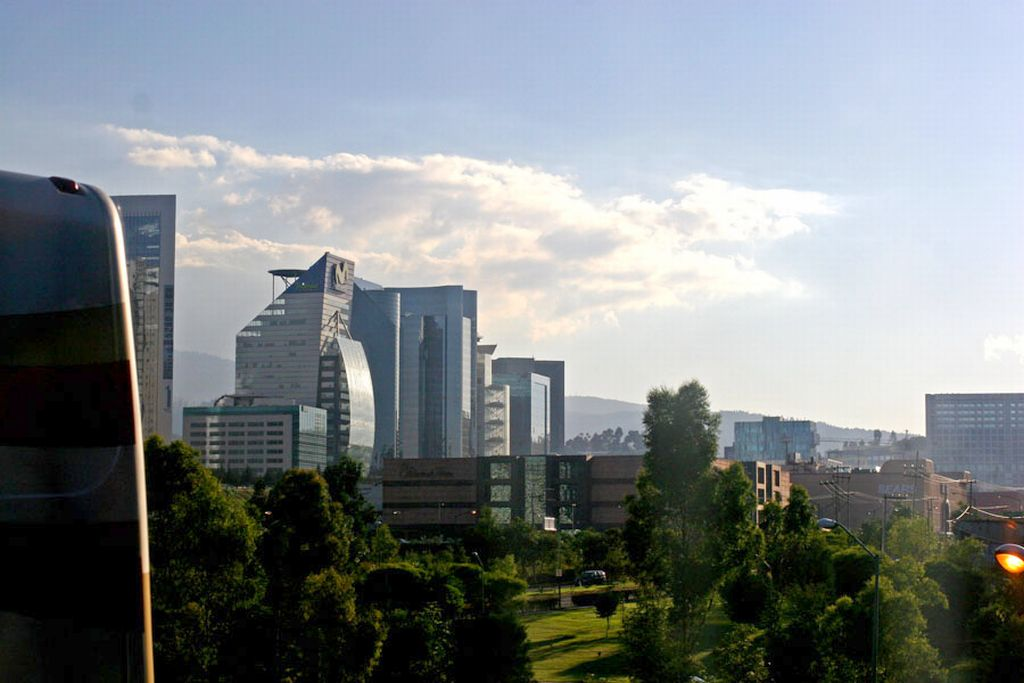
Park near outer limits of Santa Fe

Santa Fe is a business district and edge city in the west of Mexico City. It is part of the alcaldías (boroughs) of Cuajimalpa and Álvaro Obregón. Santa Fe consists mainly of luxury highrise buildings surrounding Centro Santa Fe, which is the largest mall in Latin America. The district includes a residential area and three university campuses.

Paseo de la Reforma and Avenida Constituyentes are the main roads to access the district, and are subject to traffic jams. El Insurgente commuter rail is under construction and has its current terminus in Santa Fe.

== History ==
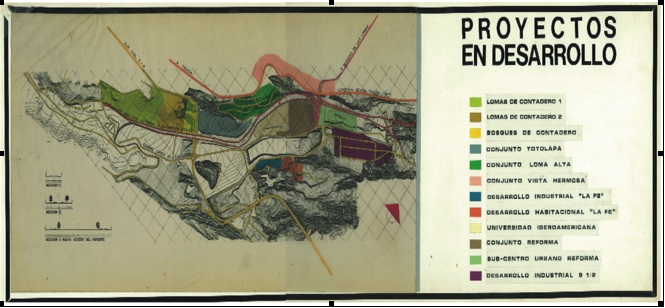
"Santa Fe" project

The current area of Santa Fe took its name from Santa Fé de México, the 16th century Pueblo Hospital of Santa Fe, founded by Vasco de Quiroga in 1532. The ruins of the hospital still exist in the area.

=== Colonial period and independence ===
During the Spanish colonial era (late 15th century – early 19th century) and the first century of independent Mexico (early 19th century – early 20th century), the then town of Santa Fe had an open landscape of sand mining activity, which was divided between the towns of Santa Fe, Santa Lucia, San Mateo and San Pedro in Cuajimalpa.

Santa Fe was situated along the route of the former royal road connecting Tacubaya to Toluca. This road was located on the present-day avenue that is known by the name of Cuajimalpa Arteaga and Salazar, traversing the Sierra de las Cruces mountains and continuing by the current route of the federal interstate highway that connects Mexico City to Toluca. During the Porfiriato era, a steam tramline was built on the former royal road, which at first ended at Santa Fe, and later expanded to La Venta, Cuajimalpa, and San Ángel. Several trees were removed during the construction of the tramline towards San Ángel.

=== 1930s and 1940s ===
The presence of sandbanks in the area was exploited in the 1930s to feed the growing construction industry in Mexico City. The extraction of sand had the unfortunate consequence of creating a deep trench in the landscape, almost 4 km long by 2 km wide and in some places up to 100 meters in depth.

A number of other land usage problems surfaced during this time period.

- The diversion of the Tacubaya River during construction of the federal highway to Toluca, meant that no water source was left available to supply the river that feeds the area of Lomas, through the natural flow of water and drainage of the area by gravity.
- Abrupt changes in ground level meant that the area had very limited potential for road building, as there was a natural barrier north of the neighborhoods that were being constructed, ravines were present to the east and west, and the Desert of the Lions national park was located to the south.
- As construction was taking place above a solid bedrock, the lack of natural drainage meant that potable water lines that were introduced were in danger of becoming contaminated by leachate that could not be removed from the soil. It was difficult to introduce artificial drainage lines due to the mechanical weakness of the soil. Also, soil settlements were in danger of rupturing and further increasing soil pollution, which led to gases being released every so often.

=== 1950s ===
In 1953, after a derailment where several were killed in what is now the colony's Ocote Cuajimalpa, electric train service was withdrawn. the old royal road to Toluca already had by then strong competition from road federal Toluca, which runs along the west ridge which had to be stopped to avoid the collapse of the road. Today, in the south of the Calle 16 de Septiembre, one can see the outline of the path that requires them to leave the eastern ridge bordering the area and who once was a slum called Romita. This right of way gave rise to the Avenida Tamaulipas which connects with the road from Santa Lucia and the avenue Vasco de Quiroga.

=== 1960s ===
In the 1960s, sand deposits became difficult to exploit because reinforcement of the walls became increasingly difficult and costly, so the mine owners began to sell the mines to the Federal District, which used it as landfill. Contrary to what is said, from the northern edge of Santa Fe Shopping Center to the area of the colony was used as Pena Blanca dump, even on the side of Cuajimalpa with tunnels that cross to walk of Tamarind. It was a mess that was duly closed and locked when President José López Portillo built his residential complex in the place popularly known as "Dog Hill".

=== 1970s ===
In the early 1970s, an urban development plan was created for the area, which would be built in an industrial zone in the area to provide jobs to locals and develop import substitution, between what is planned consider creating the social rehabilitation center west "Ceres" like those built in the north, south and west of Mexico City. This plan did not consider the construction of residential areas as it was anticipated the weak capacity to carry water or drainage out of the area. This even had to be ratified by the boards of neighbors from the surrounding towns.

=== 1980s ===
In the 1980s, most landfills had been closed and building construction had begun.

In 1982, the Universidad Iberoamericana was built on land donated by the Santa Fe unity government, marking the change from industrial land usage to the development of a residential area of great economic importance.

=== 1990s ===
During the administration of President Salinas de Gortari (1988–1994), the mayor of the city, Manuel Camacho Solís, and his colleagues devised a project that in theory would be similar to the edge city of La Défense in Paris, which would be located on existing landfills. A major risk due to building on existing landfills was the spread of contaminated water that would slip into Mexico City's water supply. Modern building techniques had to be initiated to spread several flattened layers of sand over millions of tons of garbage. To safely build upon the landfill, the City created a modern Master Program which the government and investors regulate.

It is in this decade that a construction boom began with the arrival of the Santa Fe Mall. At this time and under the authority of Manuel Camacho Solís, evictions were issued to the dwellers of Romita and other neighborhoods. Most of the dwellers have resettled in the San Jose neighborhood at Cuajimalpa. Through this avenue there is access to Tamaulipas and there started the construction of the toll highway Mexico-Toluca, which was to be extended on the outskirts of the city to reach the highway to Cuernavaca.

As a result of the 1994 economic crisis in Mexico, the master plan was halted and it was not until 2000 when the first phase of Santa Fe City was reinstated. Another of Santa Fe's original projects was cancelled, the so-called "Mountain Meadows Park", as the West Alameda Park; there are three other Alameda Parks in the northern, eastern, and southern parts of Mexico City.

=== 2000s ===
The inadequate road infrastructure, energy, hydro power, which was originally planned for a residential zone, and residents, generated active participation in solving their basic problems, so they propose and manage a new organization where they create a sort of government procedure in which a special item given: the GDF without telling borough governments, leading to coordination problems. For example, for drinking water can not connect to networks and to get their Cuajimalpa sewage cannot connect to networks of Álvaro Obregón and no treatment plant exists in proximity. Hence the new Government of Mexico City "GDF" has presented proposals for solution, as a road tunnel that starts from the Roma to City Santa Fe, which fail to be viable the high economic investment.

For those circumstances, in 2011, the possibility of creating a new office in the area is considered. The new borough of Mexico City was seen more as a way of validating the almost self-government in the area for the trust that manages it because the proposal covers only residential and commercial areas of high economic level, excluding the low level found on its periphery, which are part of the problem, since that is where are the roads and networks that feed the area.

== Santa Fe Trust ==
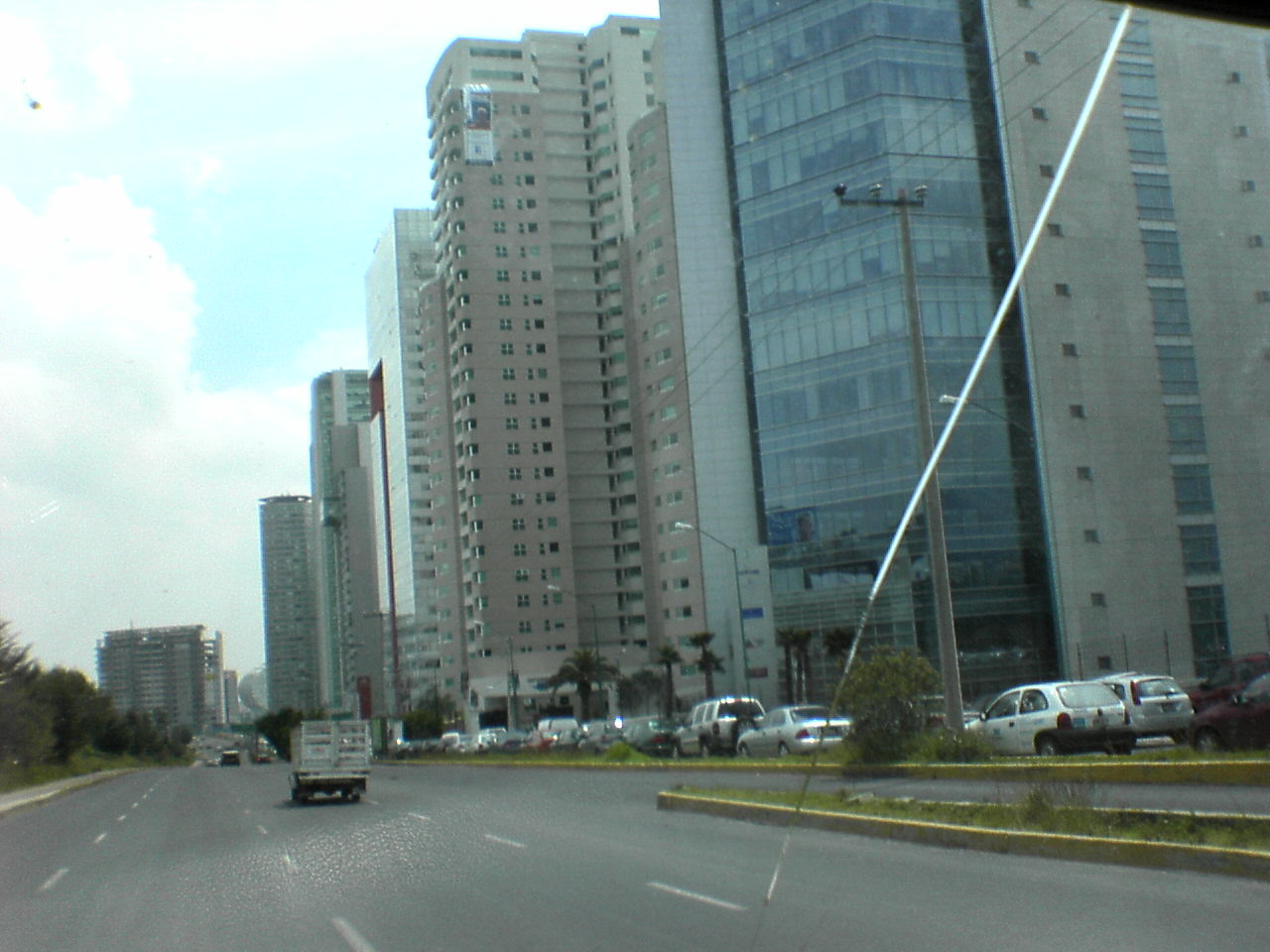
Roadways at Santa Fe

Along with the creation of Santa Fe industrial project in the 1970s was created a trust, where the government of the then Federal District "DDF" participate with their respective offices responsible for urban development, giving investors the facilities in the area electricity, lighting, roads, water and drainage to install its industry. But with the change of plans the plans were modified the characteristics of flows and inflows, which have great impact on the area. In 1994 the Association of Settlers Zedec Santa Fe, CA with the first investors in this development, among these we have:

- Automotriz Hermer, SA of C.V.
- Banca Serfin, SA of C.V.
- Impulsora Corporate Real Estate, SA of C.V.
- Corporate Option Santa Fe II, SA of C.V.
- Universidad Iberoamericana, A.C.
- Santa Fe Park, SA of C.V.
- Property Home, SA of C.V.
- Hewlett Packard de Mexico, SA of C.V.

Residents created the Association of Settlers Zedec Santa Fe in 1999, to present a common front to the problems that were found in the area.

On February 23, 2004, under the government of Marcelo Ebrard, who had been Secretary to the Government of the DDF under the government of the regent Manuel Camacho Solis, with infrastructure problems and challenges for the Federal District to meet the objectives of the original trust was created the Trust Colon de Santa Fe, constituted by the Government of the District Federal and Settlers Association Zedec Santa Fe This is because in its origin was an urban infrastructure development, where the federal government represented by the DDF was responsible for providing urban infrastructure for industrial use, even thought to use the right of way of the old railroad to build a radio station, connecting the cities of Toluca and Mexico. Something similar to the current Tren Suburbano (Suburban train) from Buenavista railway station to Cuautitlán, which is partly drawn from the current highway. For this reason, it has kept the local governments out of both the administration and budgets have been invested in the area by the government. Not to mention that some areas for security reasons are closed to the public way, has had to hire police corps and industrial bank, has had to provide water supply service pipes and removal by sewage pipes also.

The agreement invested amounts are a percentage of property tax and are subject to review and approval expressed by the technical committee as the highest authority of the trust and trustee, this is composed of 7 members of which 4 are appointed by the association and the 3 remaining the Federal District government and decisions are taken by majority vote and at least 1 of the GDF with the president casting vote in case of tie and extraordinarily many times as needed.

== Geography ==
The area defined by Mexico City's government as the Zona de Santa Fe is 931.64 hectares (3.5971 sq mi) in size and consists of the colonias:

- Santa Fe de la Loma
- Santa Fe, Centro Ciudad
- Paseo de las Lomas
- Santa Fe Peña Blanca
- San Gabriel
- Jalalpa el Grande
- Jalalpa Tepito 2ª ampliación
- Carlos A. Madrazo
- Santa Fe Cuajimalpa
- Santa Fe Tlayacapa

Borders of the Zona de Santa Fe as described above are:

- on the north: colonias Lomas de Memetla, El Yaqui, and Lomas de Vista Hermosa, then, across the Mexico-Toluca free road, the three Palo Alto colonias, behind which is col. Bosques de las Lomas including the Arcos Bosques complex.
- on the west: colonias Lomas de San Pedro, Loma del Ocote, Contadero, and Pueblo San Mateo Tlaltenango
- on the south: Ejido San Mateo, Pueblo Santa Lucía, colonias Corpus Christi, Estado de Hidalgo, Garcimarrero
- on the east: Pueblo Santa Fe, colonias Bejero del Pueblo Santa Fe, Tlapechico, and Ampliación Jalalpa

== Area statistics ==
- Divided into 10 sectors: Downtown, Cruz Manca, La Fe, La Loma, La Mexicana, Totolapa, Paseo de las Lomas, Peña Blanca, Bosques de Santa Fe and the School Zone
- 13.80% of the total area of offices in the city
- Commercial rent between 20 and 25 dollars per square meter in a class A+ (highest-ranked) building
- 70,000 employees
- 4,311 resident families
- 8 million shopping mall visitors per year to the Centro Santa Fe
- 6 universities: Universidad Iberoamericana was the first in the zone. CIDE, Iberoamericana, Universidad Panamericana, Tec Monterrey, UAM, UVM.
- 13,500 students

== Design ==
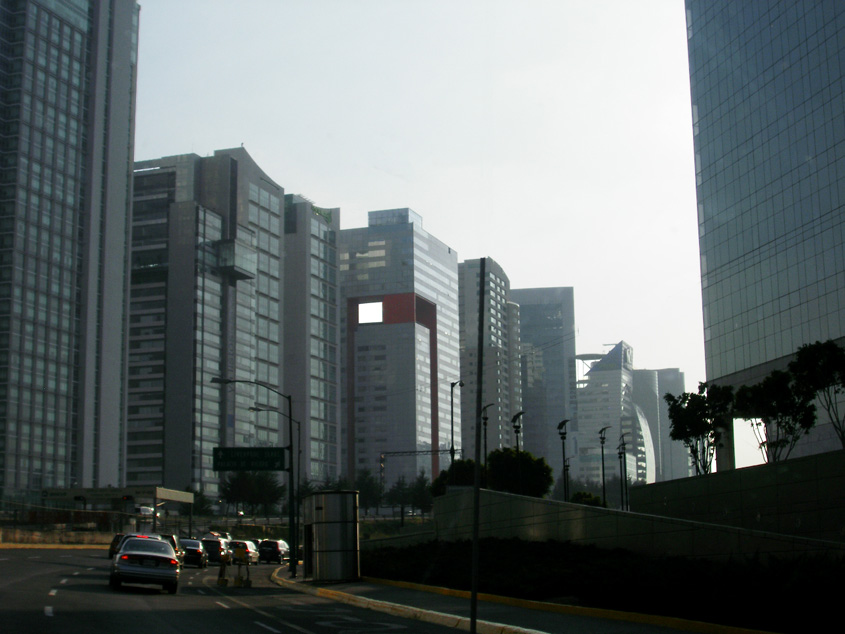
Row of Cruz Manca's buildings seen from 'La Mexicana'

Academics from many universities in Mexico and abroad have studied Santa Fe's design. Some believe that the design is well-planned while others believe that the design is poor and will harm the area. Enrique Martín Moreno and María Moreno of Iberoamericana University characterize Santa Fe as a self-contained city where the inhabitants do not venture outside. Jeffrey Inaba of Harvard University argued that Santa Fe should build connections to other parts of Mexico City. Roque González, the author of the original Santa Fe development project, said in 2005 "in 15 years will be a serious problem due to the fact that there are insufficient roads, public spaces, pedestrian areas. We're headed straight into gridlock and a lack of spaces usable by humans."

Despite the criticism Santa Fe continues its development. However, the lack of infrastructure and over-investment have created an oversupply of commercial real estate. According to Colliers the vacancy rate in Santa Fe is 27 percent (2005), the highest in the city. This oversupply in the commercial real estate market can also be seen in the monthly rent, having been the highest in the city for A+ buildings, it is now in the average "C" (range of $20–25 per square meter), higher than that of the central Paseo de la Reforma and Polanco markets.

== Businesses ==
The airline Volaris has its headquarters in Colonia Zedec in Santa Fe, previously in Peña Blanca, Santa Fe. Grupo Bimbo has its headquarters in Peña Blanca. Chrysler Group Mexico has its head office in Santa Fe. Liverpool has its headquarters in Cuajimalpa.

Other companies with business offices in Santa Fe include Best Buy, Huawei, Ford, Sony, Movistar (Telefónica), Microsoft, Televisa, Roche, PepsiCo, The Coca-Cola Company, McDonald's, Amazon, Apple Inc. and Prudential.

== Transportation ==
Road access from central Mexico City remains inadequate, with Paseo de la Reforma and Avenida Constituyentes both congested at peak hours. Plans have been circulated to build a tunnel from the Circuito Interior in Condesa along Constituyentes to the point where it meets Reforma just before Santa Fe.

In 2013 the Supervía Poniente opened, a toll road linking Santa Fe with the Anillo Periférico ring road at San Jerónimo in southwestern Mexico City. It has become one of the most used and profitable toll roads in Mexico City. It generated on its first five years of operation $19.6 million pesos to the government.

Just west of Santa Fe, the Chamapa-La Venta toll road connects to the Interlomas edge city and points north.

=== Public transportation ===
As far as public transportation, there are pesero minibuses and regular public buses. The Ecobus connects Santa Fe (terminal at Centro Santa Fe) with Metro Balderas in downtown Mexico City and another route to Metro Miguel Ángel de Quevedo. Additionally, other buses connect to Metro Tacubaya and Metro La Villa-Basílica.

Since 2024, the area has been connected to Toluca by the El Insurgente commuter rail system with a station located next to Centro Santa Fe. The whole line, connecting Santa Fe to Observatorio station on Line 1, will open in 2026.

== Education ==
Private schools in Santa Fe and Cuajimalpa:

- Westhill Institute Santa Fe campus
- Eton School elementary through high school campus
- Colegio Monteverde
- Pinecrest Institute - Preschool to secundaria
- Colegio Eugenio de Mazenod in Col. Prados de la Montaña is near Santa Fe.

Universities in Santa Fe and Cuajimalpa:

- Universidad Iberoamericana
- Tecnológico de Monterrey, Campus Santa Fe
- Universidad Autónoma Metropolitana
- Centro de Investigación y Docencia Económicas
- Universidad Panamericana

== See also ==
- Central business district
- Luxury apartment
