= Rickshaws in Mexico City =

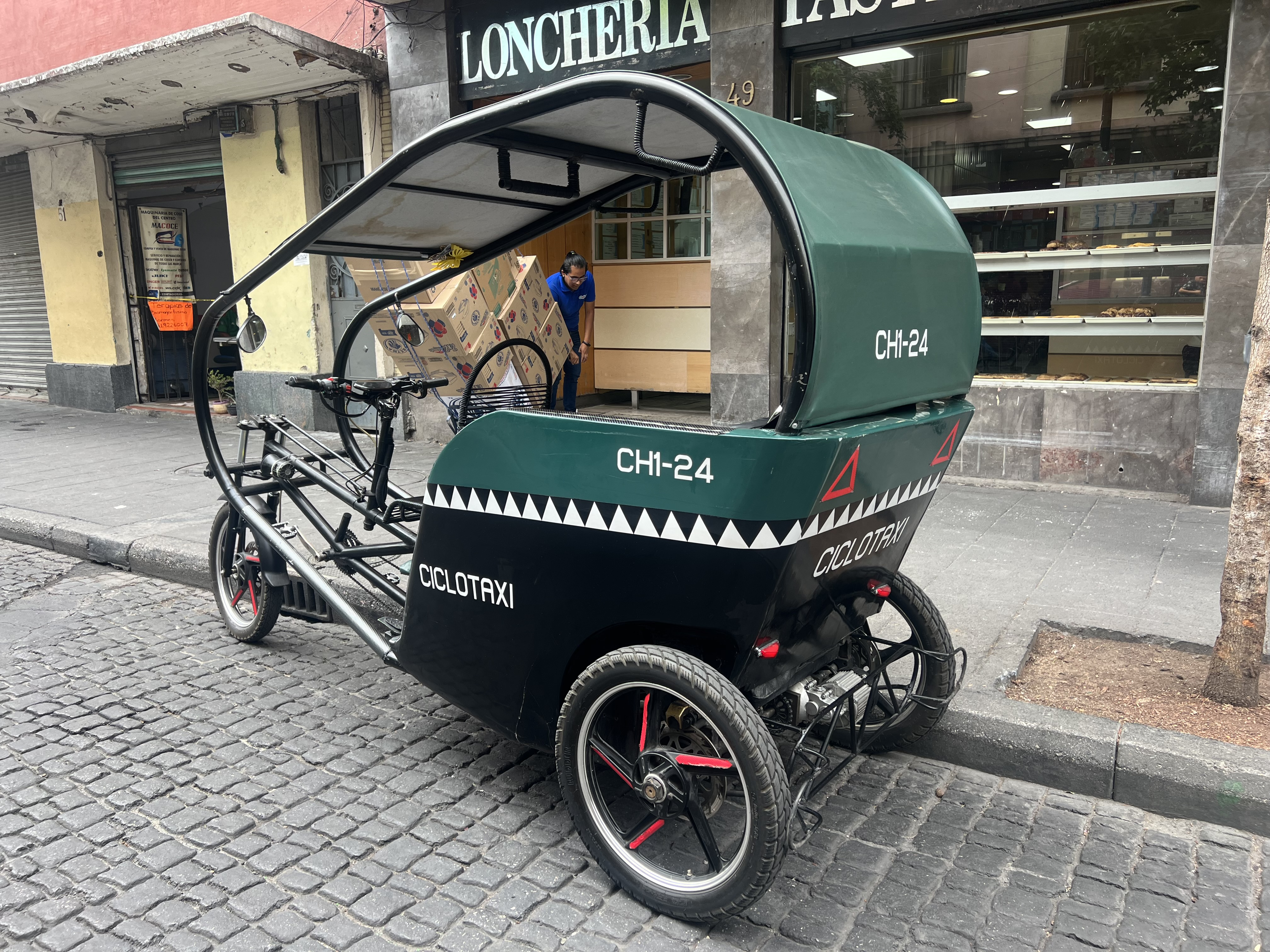
A bike taxi in 2023

Rickshaws are used in Mexico City, primarily for the transportation of citizens and tourists. Otherwise known in Spanish as bicitaxis (bike taxis), ciclotaxis (cycle taxi), golfitaxis (golf cart taxis), mototaxis (motorcycle taxis) or tricitaxis (tricycle taxis), they can be either human-powered or engine-powered transports. They are regulated by the Secretariat of Mobility of the city (Secretaría de Movilidad; SEMOVI).

== History ==
=== 1990s ===
In August 1990, a pilot program was created with 30 units created by the National Polytechnic Institute. By 1998 it was estimated that there were 1,300 units throughout the city. Unregulated rickshaws started to operate at the end of the decade in the historic center of Mexico City. Ways of banning them were sought but did not succeed.

=== 2000s ===
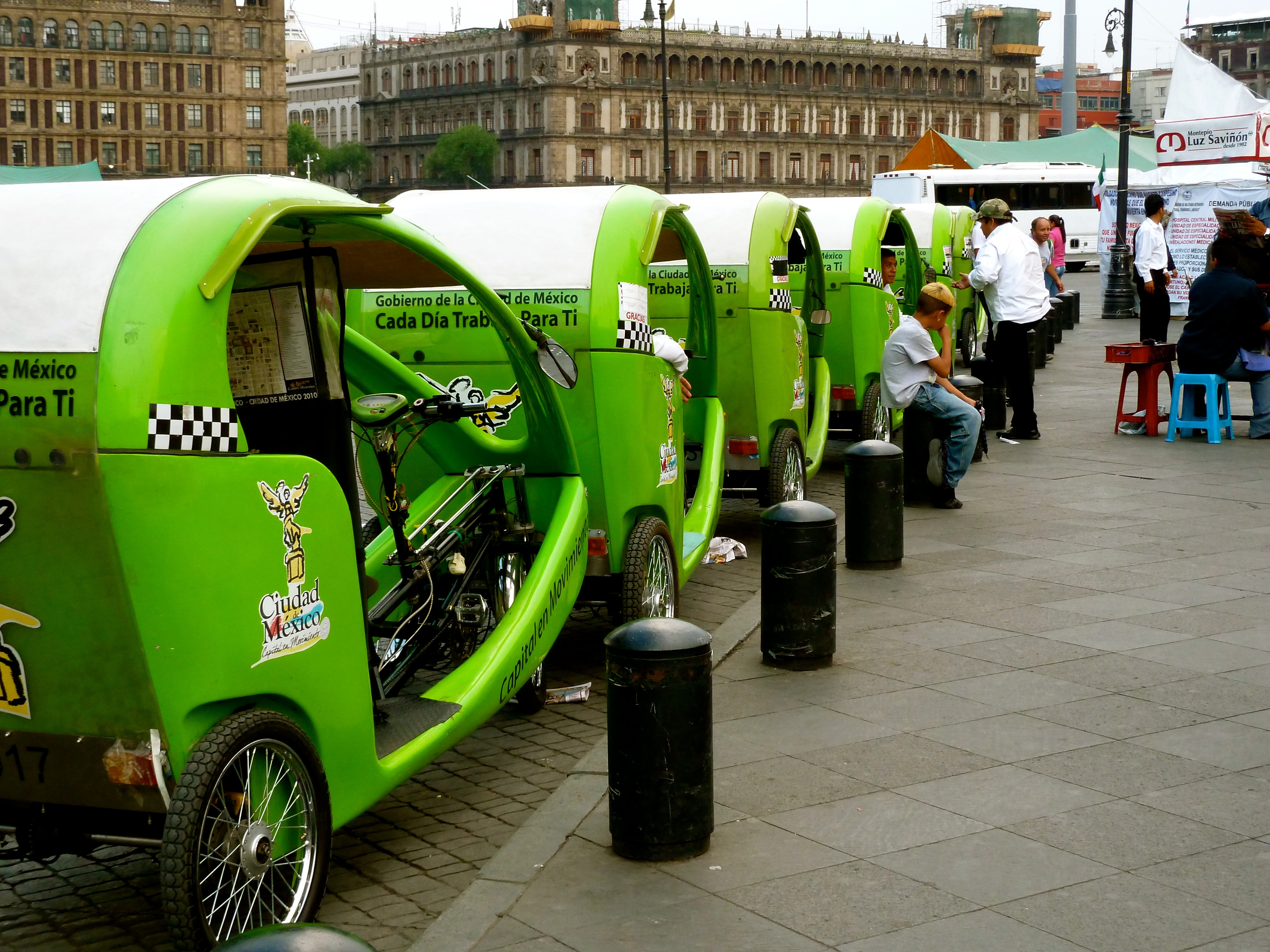
Multiple tricycle taxis with the 2009 green design

In 2004, the Secretaría del Transporte (SETRAVI, later renamed to Secretaría de Movilidad, abbreviated as SEMOVI) announced that it would seek to regulate the units, as they depended on local governments. In 2008, the SETRAVI estimated that there were around 500 rickshaws operating only in downtown Mexico City.

In 2009, the units operating in the center of the city were renovated during the governorship of Marcelo Ebrard as head of government.

=== 2010s ===
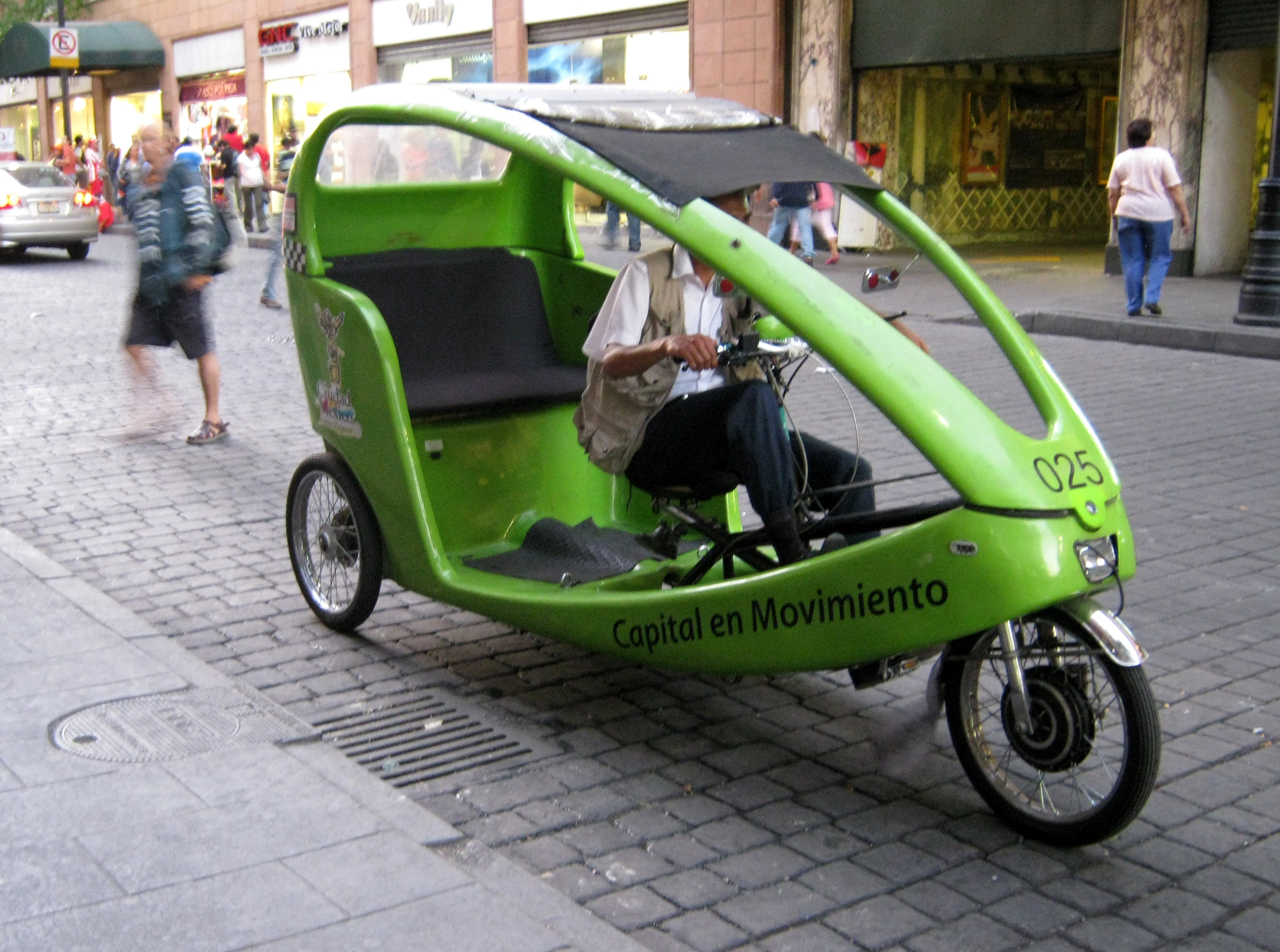
A rickshaw in 2010

In 2010, the city government delivered units from China. These were problematic due to the lack of spare parts, as they could only be imported from China.

During the decade, operations began to decline. The SEMOVI estimated that there were only 80 rickshaws operating in the city center in 2018. Clandestine units were detected and legal units operate in a disorderly manner, according to SEMOVI.

=== 2020s ===
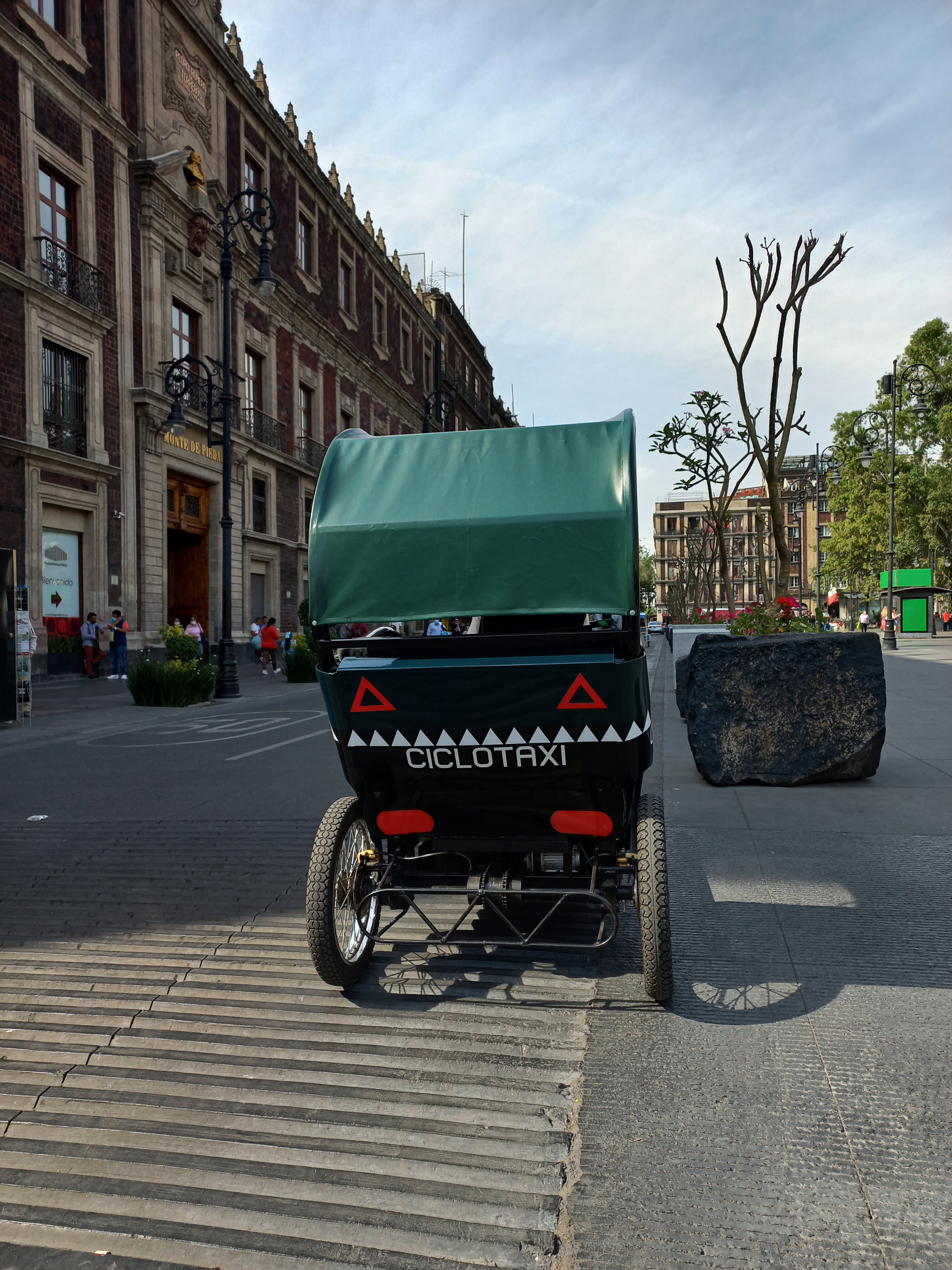
Designs for the 2022 renovation of the rickshaws operating in the historic center of the city.

During the COVID-19 pandemic in Mexico, rickshaws operating in the boroughs of Iztapalapa and Venustiano Carranza, as well as the neighboring municipalities of Ecatepec and Nezahualcóyotl in the State of Mexico, received a higher passage rate due to various measures taken by the city to reduce the number of visitors, including the Hoy No Circula program—a local no-drive days strategy—or because the passengers did not want to share their transportation with other users.

In 2021, the government of the city announced actions to renovate the existing units operating in the historic center of the city, including the payment of 30,000 pesos to drivers who upgrade their units to the required standards. The style of the units is similar to that of the city's 1950s taxis.

== Gallery ==
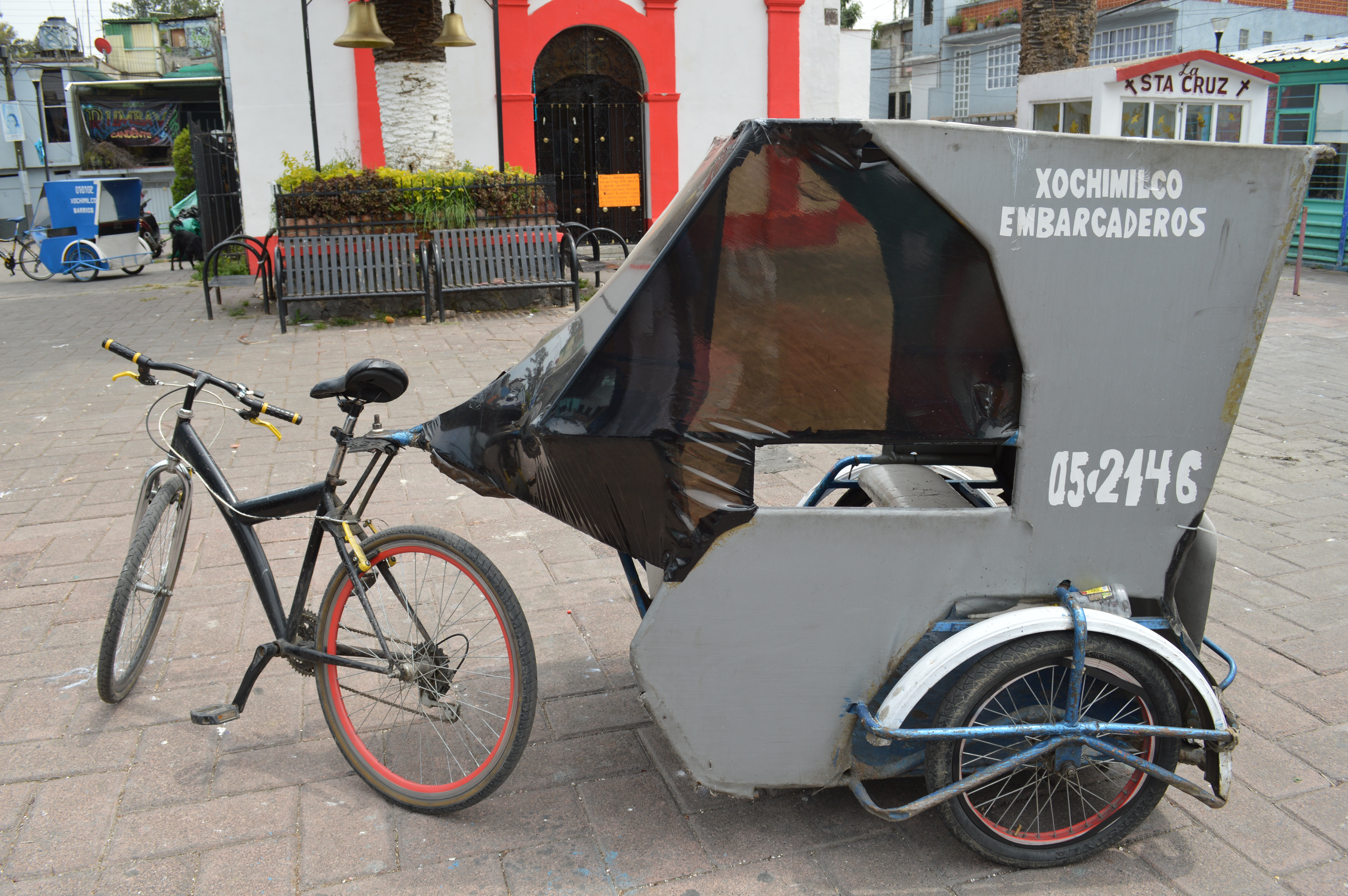
A bike taxi in Xochimilco.

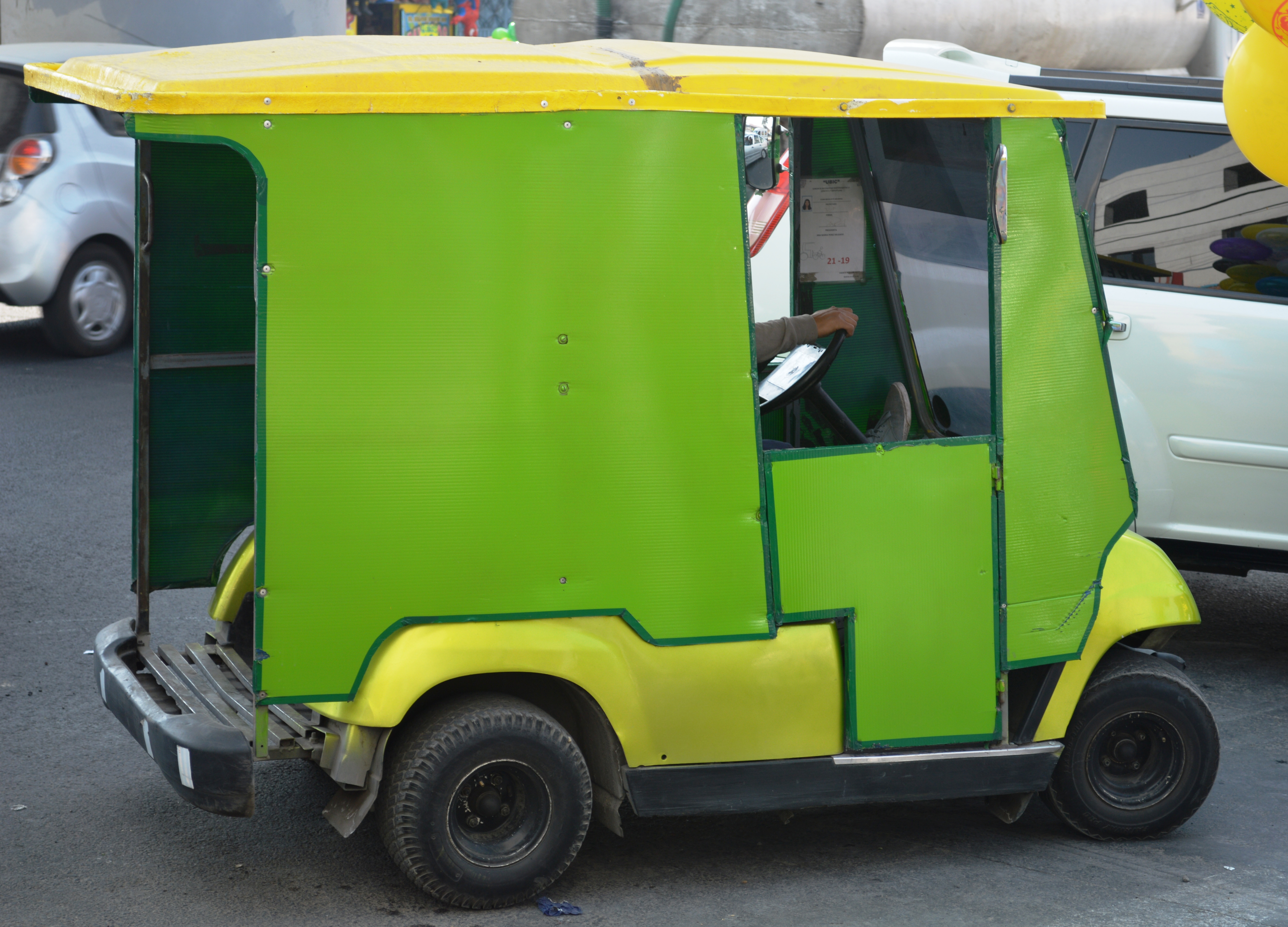
A golficart in Tláhuac.

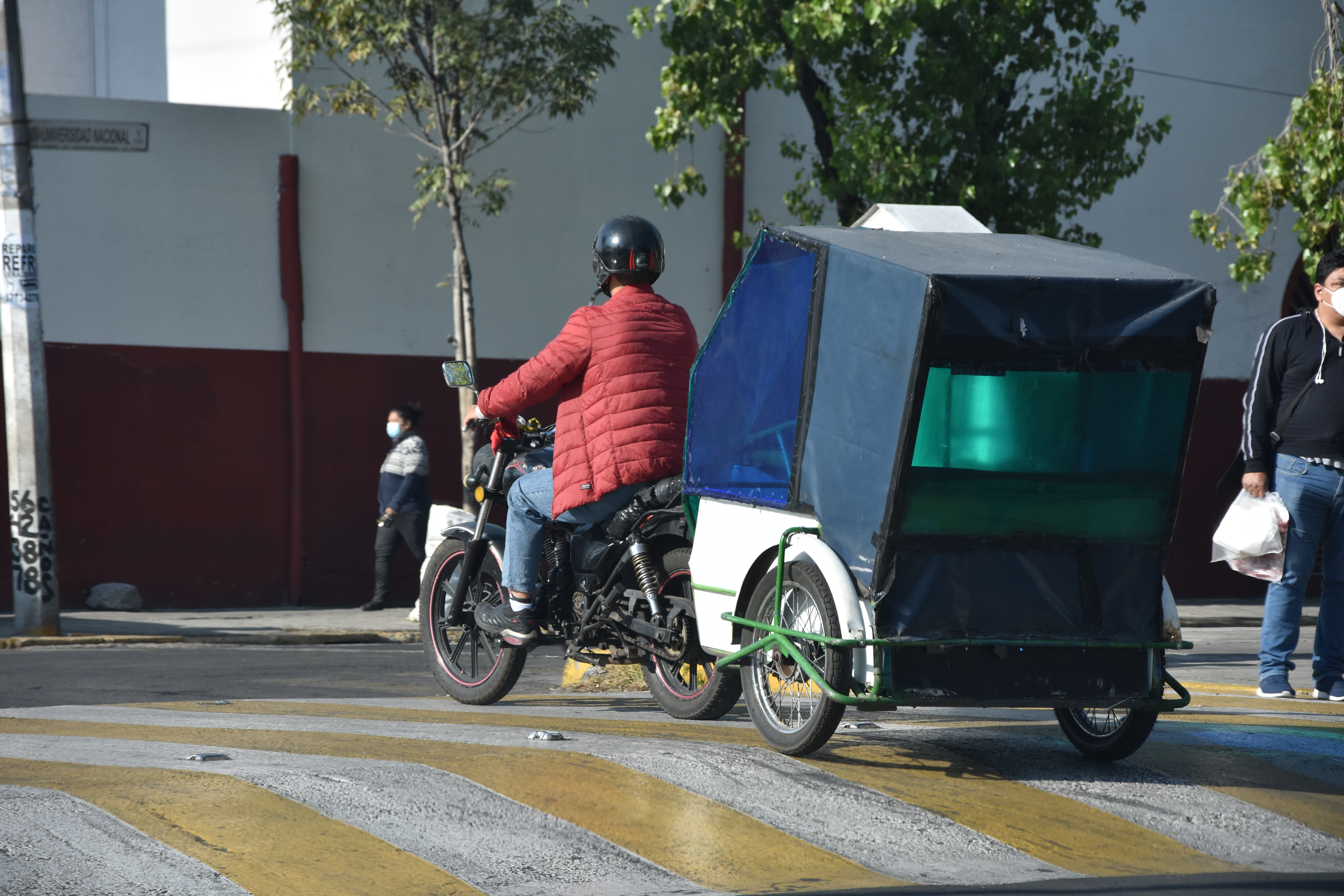
A motorcycle taxi in Venustiano Carranza
