= Distribuidor Vial San Antonio =

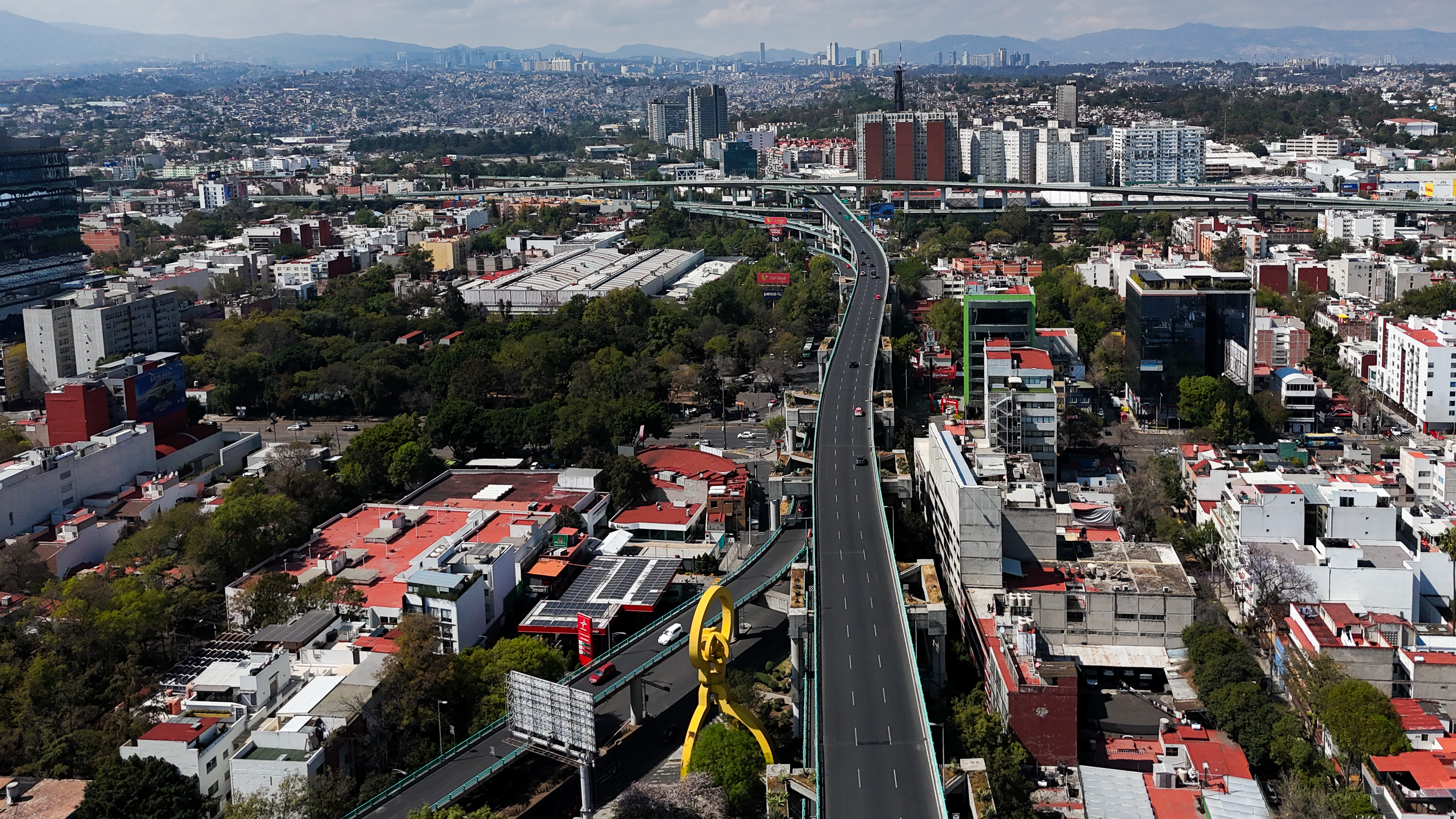
- Double-deck viaduct above Avenida San Antonio, with the connection to the Anillo Periférico visible in the background, all part of the Distribuidor Vial San Antonio
- Interactive map of Distribuidor Vial San Antonio

Location
- Benito Juárez, Mexico City
- Roads at junction: Anillo Periférico; Avenida San Antonio; Viaducto Río Becerra

Construction
- Type: Stacked road interchange
- Opened: June 8, 2003
- Maximum height: 22 m (72 ft)

The Distribuidor Vial San Antonio is a road interchange connecting the Anillo Periférico, Avenida San Antonio (Eje 5 Sur and Eje 6 Sur), and Viaducto Río Becerra, located in the Benito Juárez borough of Mexico City. It was the first section built as part of the "second level" ("segundo piso") project on the Anillo Periférico, a flagship public works project of Andrés Manuel López Obrador's administration as head of government of the then-Federal District.

The interchange along the section between Avenida San Antonio and Viaducto Río Becerra

== History ==
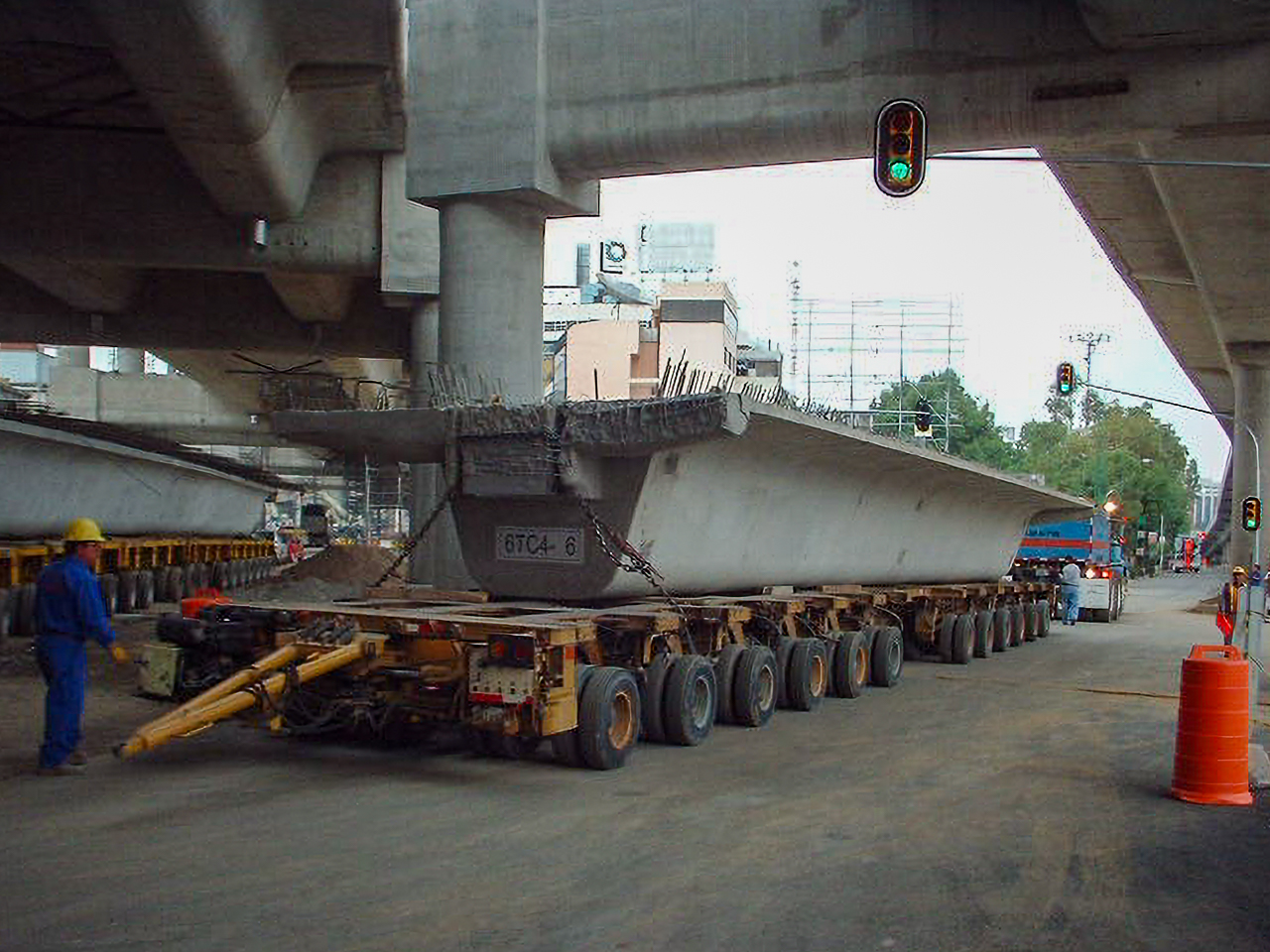
A precast concrete beam, colloquially known as a ballena ("whale"), during the final stage of the interchange's construction. The use of these structures was a novelty for residents of the capital.

On December 5, 2001, upon completing his first year in office, Andrés Manuel López Obrador (AMLO) announced the construction of a free, elevated second level above the Anillo Periférico and the Viaducto, a project known as the "segundo piso" ("second floor"). The project's intellectual authorship was credited to engineer David Serur Edid and architects José María Riobóo and Alberto Busali. At the time, it was described as the largest such public works undertaking since 1976, when professor Carlos Hank González's ejes viales road network was planned.

The proposal immediately drew controversy from political parties and specialists. On May 31, 2002, amid the debate, the head of government announced both a public referendum on the project and the construction of the Periférico–San Antonio–Río Becerra–Tintoreto road interchange, spanning 3.5 kilometers in both directions, with a surface area of 66,000 square meters and an estimated cost of nearly one billion pesos. Despite this initial technical name, the interchange became commonly known as the Distribuidor Vial San Antonio, since the structure runs largely above Avenida San Antonio (Eje 5 Sur/Eje 6 Sur).

The bidding process began on July 28, 2002. On September 22, 2002, the first public referendum in modern Mexico City history was held; with turnout of roughly 9% of the electoral roll, the city government complied with the favorable result and confirmed construction of the second level. The executive design of the interchange was commissioned to José María Riobóo, while construction was put out to tender by Servicios Metropolitanos (Servimet). Project oversight was assigned, according to AMLO, to Claudia Sheinbaum, then Secretary of the Environment for the Federal District.

Construction formally began on September 30, 2002. The new second-level route required additional interchanges to handle the resulting vehicle flow, leading to the construction of both the Distribuidor Vial San Antonio and the Distribuidor Vial San Jerónimo.

To speed up construction on both the Periférico and the San Antonio and San Jerónimo interchanges, hundreds of precast concrete beams weighing up to 300 tonnes — colloquially known as ballenas ("whales") — were used for the roadway surface, supported by concrete capitals atop concrete piles anchored 28 meters deep. Their transport and placement, carried out with specialized machinery, were a novelty for residents of the capital and required street closures during their passage.

Eight safety incidents were recorded during construction. The most serious occurred on May 28, 2003, when technician Samuel Cornejo was crushed due to a mechanical failure in a crane placing a ballena; he died the following day. AMLO witnessed the placement of the last ballena in the Nonoalco neighborhood on June 6, 2003. The interchange was inaugurated by then-president Vicente Fox and AMLO on Sunday, June 8, with a pedestrian walkthrough attended by people from Mexico City and several states. It opened to traffic on Wednesday, June 11 at 7:00 a.m., at the San Antonio–Tintoretto merge point; the first vehicle to enter, a Dodge Neon, broke down and was pushed by its young occupants. A total of 250 police officers were deployed to the area during the first days of operation to reduce confusion among drivers.

== Description ==
The Distribuidor Vial San Antonio does not constitute a single mileage-marked stretch of road, but rather a road interchange made up of several structures, including the double viaduct — two separate decks, one per direction — built above Avenida San Antonio. It has two lanes per direction, with four entrances and four exits. The structure covers a surface area of 66,000 square meters, supported by 356 precast concrete beams (ballenas) and 280 columns up to 22 meters tall.

The interchange connects the following roads:

- Anillo Periférico
- Avenida San Antonio (Eje 5 Sur / Eje 6 Sur)
- Circuito Interior, along its Avenida Revolución and Avenida Patriotismo sections
- Viaducto Río Becerra

In the westbound-southbound direction, entrances to the interchange are located along Calle 13 and San Antonio Oriente, leading to Prolongación San Antonio Poniente and Francisco P. Miranda, toward Barranca del Muerto. Article 65 of Mexico City's Traffic Regulations prohibits cargo trucks, passenger transport vehicles, motorcycles, and bicycles from using the interchange, restricting it to private vehicles.

Since 2012, the northern end of the interchange has connected to the toll-operated section of the Anillo Periférico, run under concession by Aleatica (formerly OHL), which extends to the former Toreo de Cuatro Caminos area.

The nearest public transit station is San Antonio, on Line 7 of the Mexico City Metro, located beneath the interchange itself at the junction of Avenida Revolución with Eje 5 Sur San Antonio and Eje 6 Sur Tintoreto.
