= Anillo Periférico =

Highway in Mexico

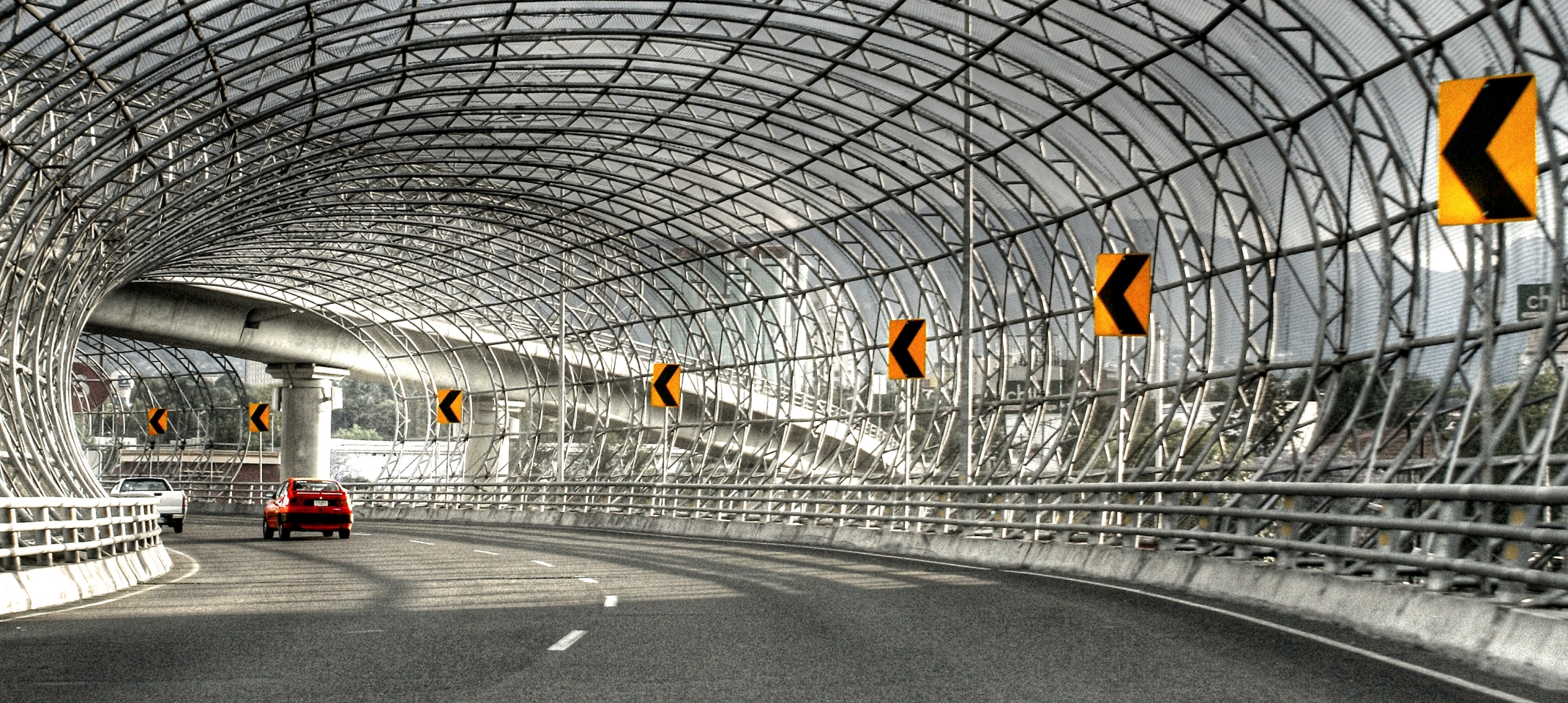
Second level of the Periférico at San Jerónimo

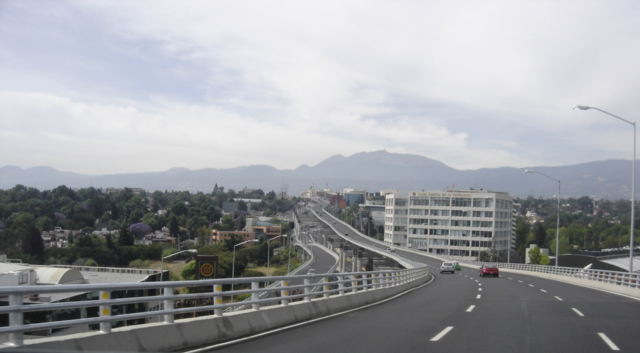
Elevated part of the Anillo Periférico

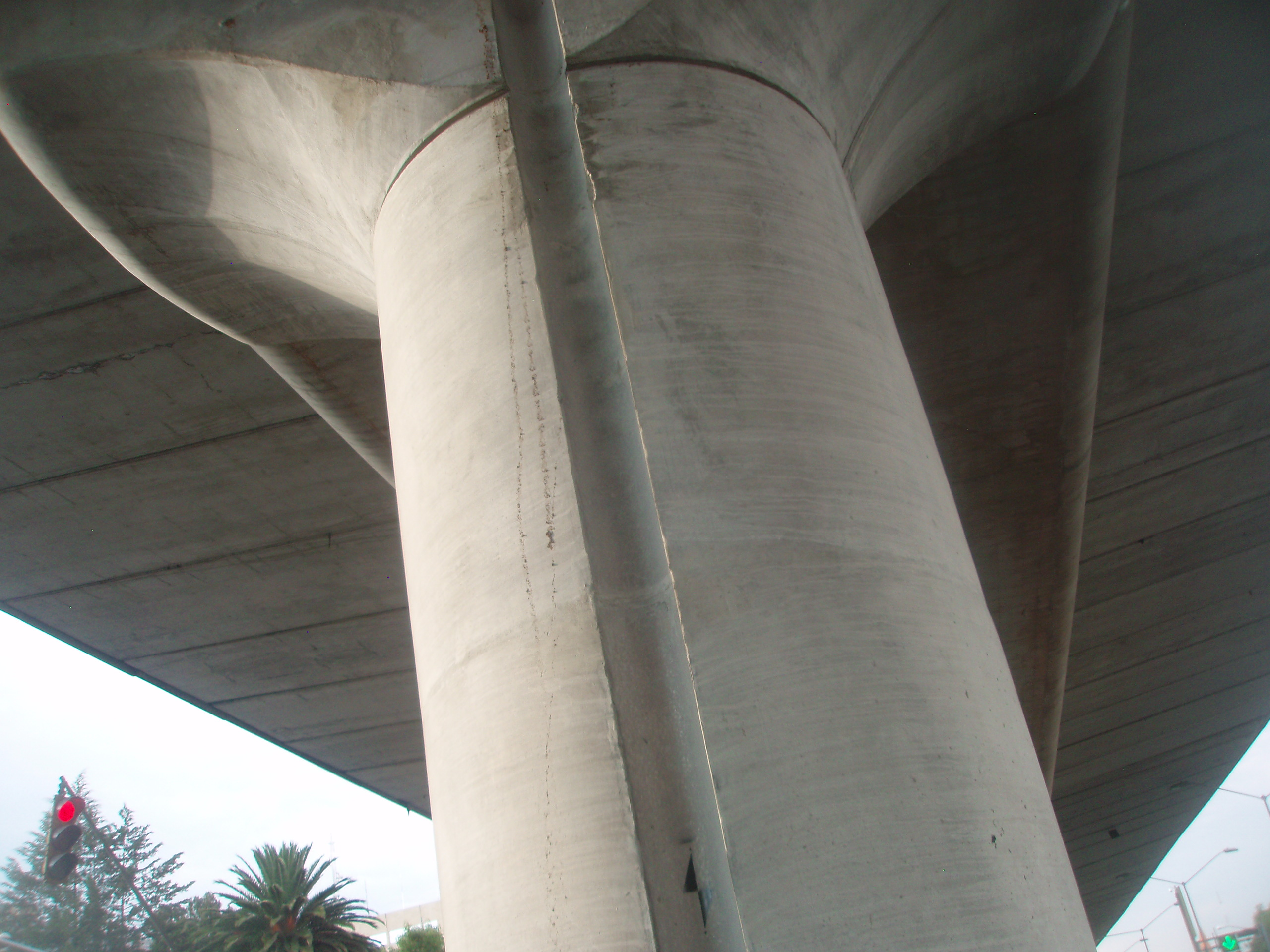
Structure of the second floor (distribuidor vial) of Periférico (north of Mexico City, at the cross with Ejército Nacional Ave.)

The Anillo Periférico known by locals as el periférico (Spanish for peripheral ring) is the outer beltway of Mexico City.

The Periferico was originally planned by architect Carlos Contreras as early as 1925, together with other major roads such as the Viaducto Miguel Alemán. Some parts of the beltway were built to follow the bed of a river; the flow of the river was modified to flow through a pipe.

The beltway gained major media attention when the then Mexico City mayor, Andrés Manuel López Obrador, started a project to turn a southern section of the ring into a two-story highway. The second level was finished in 2006 in the Federal District and in the State of Mexico in 2009. From Cuautitlán in the north (State of Mexico) to Naucalpan at the Federal District border the second floor operates as the Viaducto Bicentenario ("Bicentennial Elevated Viaduct"). From the old bullring (Toreo) at the north of the Federal District to San Jerónimo in the southwest the second level is called the Autopista Urbana Norte ("Northern Urban Tollway"). At San Jerónimo the second level intersects directly with a toll road to Santa Fe, the Supervía Poniente. From San Jerónimo to the intersection with the Calzada de Tlalpan in the south of the city, the second level is called the Autopista Urbana Sur ("Southern Urban Tollway").
