= Ímaz =

Ímaz or Imaz may refer to:

== Surname ==
- Carlos Blasco de Imaz (1924–1996), Basque nationalist
- Eduardo Blasco de Imaz (b. 1994), Spanish swimmer
- Carlos Cañal y Gómez-Imaz (1905–1964), Spanish diplomat
- José Gómez-Imaz Simón (1838–1903), Spanish politician and sailor
- Manuel Gómez Imaz (1844–1922), Spanish journalist
- Ahmed Imaz (b. 1992), Maldivian footballer
- Ander Imaz (b. 1994), Spanish player of Basque pelota
- Andoni Imaz (b. 1971), Spanish footballer
- Carlos Ímaz (b. 1958), Mexican politician, academic, and activist
- Ekain Imaz (b. 2002), Spanish rugby player
- Esteban Imaz (1903–1980), 1960–1966 Argentine Supreme Court Justice
- Eugenio Imaz (1900–1951), Spanish philosopher
- Francisco A. Imaz (1906—1993), Argentine politician
- Jesús Imaz (b. 1990), Spanish footballer
- Jorge Imaz (b. 1950), Argentine rower
- José Imaz (1761–1828), Spanish military commander
- José Imaz Baquedano (1767–1834), Spanish politician and economist
- José Imaz y Gadea (1800–1854), Spanish bookseller and printer
- José Luis de Ímaz (1928–2008), Argentine lawyer, sociologist, and political scientist
- Josu Jon Imaz (b. 1963), Spanish politician, executive, and scientist
- Manuela Ímaz (b. 1979), Mexican actress
- Pepe Imaz (b. 1974), Spanish tennis coach
- Virginia Imaz Quijera (b. 1962), Spanish scene director and performer
- Ricardo Rocha Imaz (1922–2015), Uruguayan politician

== Places ==
- Imaz, town in Navarre, Spain
- Imaza District, Peruvian subdivision
