= Carlos Ímaz =

Mexican politician (born 1959)

Carlos Ímaz Gispert

Delegational Head of Tlalpan
- In office 1 October 2003 – 15 March 2004
- Preceded by: Gilberto López y Rivas
- Succeeded by: Eliseo Moyao Morales

Personal details
- Born: 18 March 1959 (age 67) Mexico City, Mexico
- Party: Party of the Democratic Revolution (1989–2013)
- Spouse: Claudia Sheinbaum (m. 1987; div. 2016)
- Domestic partner: Sandra Alarcón (1982–1986)
- Children: 2
- Education: National Autonomous University of Mexico; Stanford University
- Occupation: Sociologist, academic, activist and politician

Carlos Ímaz Gispert (born 18 March 1959) is a Mexican politician, academic, and activist and a founding member of the Party of the Democratic Revolution. He has served as the Delegational Head of Tlalpan, a borough of Mexico City.

== Early life and teaching ==
Ímaz was born in 1959, and is the second son of Mexican mathematician Carlos Ímaz Jahnke and Montserrat Gispert Cruells, an ethnobotanical researcher. His grandfather Eugenio Ímaz Echeverría was a Spanish philosopher. In 1985, he graduated from the National Autonomous University of Mexico with a degree in sociology and later earned a doctorate in education from Stanford University. Since 1984, he has been a professor at the National Autonomous University of Mexico.

== Personal life ==
In 1986, he began a relationship with Claudia Sheinbaum. They married the following year in 1987. In 1988 their daughter was born and they stayed married until 2016.

== Political career ==
=== Party of the Democratic Revolution ===
Following a student movement in 1987, Ímaz became active in left-wing organizations, and in 1989, helped form the Party of the Democratic Revolution.

=== Leader of PRD Mexico City ===
Between 1999 and 2002, he served as president of the PRD in the Federal District. During the fourth state congress of the party, he was quoted as saying: "The Party of the Democratic Revolution will not tolerate the herding or buying of votes in the process of selecting a candidate for the head of government of the capital, which is to be carried out." Following this, he called for the hunting down of political fraudsters, or mapaches.

=== Delegational Chief of Tlalpan and political scandal ===
In 2003, he was elected as the Delegational Chief of Tlalpan, a position he assumed in the same year.

However, five months after taking office in March 2004, a series of scandals known as the videoscandals began to surface in Mexico. The scandals implicated politicians and other public servants in embezzling large sums of money for personal use. Those implicated included the finance secretary of the Federal District, Gustavo Ponce, and René Bejarano, a local deputy of the PRD and president of the government commission of the legislative assembly. Within 48 hours of René Bejarano's video release, Ímaz, then Delegational Chief in Tlalpan, simply said, "Me too...," admitting he had been part of the scandal.

In an interview on March 5, 2003, with journalist Carmen Aristegui, Ímaz stated that the money received was for "cazamapaches" (raccoon hunt) brigades organized to combat electoral fraud, which are common in Mexico. He also acknowledged financial contributions from Carlos Ahumada for the campaigns of Rosario Robles and for his own pre-campaign when he was running for Delegational Chief. He described Carlos Ahumada as a blackmailer and mercenary, who later demanded directorship positions in departments and administrations managed by the delegation, which Ímaz says he refused. This refusal, however, strained relations with Rosario Robles. Ímaz claimed the series of scandals were a plan to discredit the head of the Federal District, Andrés Manuel López Obrador.

On March 8 Ímaz was videotaped receiving 350,000 pesos and by March 15, he stepped down from public office on leave to face the charges.

==== Criminal proceedings ====
Ímaz claimed the money he received was for the presidential campaign of the PRD candidate Rosario Robles, and he also claimed the money was used to fund groups defending the PRD vote. In an interview with La Jornada, he says he received money from Ahumada without conditions, though Ahumada later attempted to install two loyalists into the administration under his charge, which Ímaz refused.

On August 24, 2004, Judge XI of the Criminal Court of the North Prison, Carlos Morales, declared Ímaz criminally responsible for electoral crime, stating that the Attorney General's Office of the Federal District had provided sufficient evidence against him.

Judge Morales sentenced Ímaz to three years and six months in prison, and suspended his political rights. However, due to the electoral nature of the crimes and the inability of the court quantify everything and other issues with the offense imprisonment term length, the penalty was changed to a fine of 100,000 pesos. Ímaz then paid the fine and filed an appeal against the sentence without any jail time.

On December 15, 2004, Ímaz was exonerated by three magistrates of the fourth criminal chamber of the superior court of justice of the Federal District. They specified there was no evidence to establish criminal responsibility. Ímaz also provided evidence in court that contributed to the acquittal of René Bejarano.

==== Case against Ahumada ====
In the case against Ahumada, Carlos Ímaz was called as a witness. On March 20, 2004, Carlos Ahumada attempted to reverse the situation by federally denouncing Ímaz and Bejarano for extortion, basing the complaint on his own testimony and those of his business partner, his secretary, and Gustavo Ponce. The complaint did not proceed.

=== Responses and announcements within the PRD ===
On March 6, 2004, Cuauhtémoc Cárdenas spoke out against acts of corruption by party members at the national council of the PRD. Regarding Carlos Ímaz, he stated that Ímaz should resign from his position as delegate of Tlalpan.

On March 8, 2004, the plenary of the national executive committee of the PRD determined the start of the procedure for the suspension of guarantees, anticipating a possible expulsion from the party, which did not occur.

On April 21, 2004, the then head of Government of the Federal District, Andrés Manuel López Obrador, characterized it as reprehensible and condemnable that Ímaz and René Bejarano Martínez received money from Carlos Ahumada. Unlike Rosario Robles, Ímaz refused to resign from his party.

== Political life after the scandal ==
Ímaz maintained loyalty to the PRD and to López Obrador following the scandals in 2004.

On August 10, 2006 he participated in a sit-in at Reforma against alleged electoral fraud. He also attended a recount of the fifth electoral district presidential votes for the city of Monterrey, Nuevo León. He has also self-defined as a "rank-and-file militant" along with 11 lawyers and 17 other people.

On September 16, 2006, in the Zócalo during the Democratic National Convention, he was proposed as a member of the Civil Resistance Committee of Andrés Manuel López Obrador against electoral fraud. At the event, shouts of "Ímaz no! Ímaz no!" could be heard.

After his approval to committee, Ímaz resigned, saying that "no appointments are needed to fight for democracy and justice", and that he would continue fighting alongside the Convention and Andrés Manuel López Obrador.
