= Sheinbaum (surname) =

Sheinbaum (Yiddish: שיינבוים, romanized: sheynboym, IPA: [ˈʃɛɪnbɔɪm], lit. 'beautiful tree'; cf. German Schönbaum and Schoenbaum) is a Yiddish surname. Notable people with the surname include:

- Carlos Sheinbaum Yoselevitz (1933–2013), Mexican businessman and chemical engineer
- Claudia Sheinbaum (born 1962), Mexican scientist and politician, 66th and current president of Mexico, daughter of Carlos
- Louis P. Sheinbaum (fl. 1979–2011), American lawyer
- Stanley Sheinbaum (1920–2016), American peace and human rights activist

== See also ==
- Schönbaum
