= Víctor Trujillo =

Mexican actor

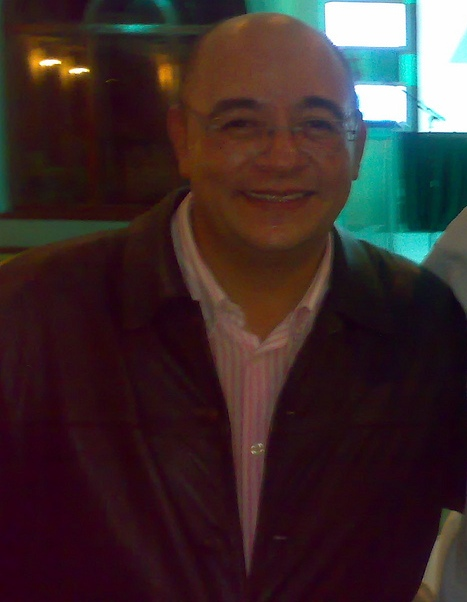
- Trujillo in 2008
- Born: Víctor Alberto Trujillo Matamoros; July 30, 1961 (age 65); Mexico City, Mexico
- Other name: Brozo
- Notable work: La caravana, Los Protagonistas, El Mañanero, El Circo de Brozo, El Cristal con que se Mira, Notifiero
- Spouse: Carolina Padilla (m. 1982; died 2004)
- Relatives: Rubén Trujillo (brother)

Comedy career
- Years active: 1987 – present
- Genres: Observational comedy, surreal humor, albur, insult comedy
- Subjects: Self-deprecation, everyday life, politics

Víctor Alberto Trujillo Matamoros (born July 30, 1961) is a Mexican actor and comedian. He is best known for his character Brozo el Payaso Tenebroso ("Brozo the Creepy Clown"); a green-haired, unkempt, obscene and aggressive clown. Trujillo has performed as a voice actor, and has worked for Imevisión, Televisa, and LatinUS.

== Life and career ==
Trujillo was born in Mexico City. In 1987, after appearing in an Imevisión variety show called En tienda y trastienda, Trujillo created a new program called La caravana, alongside his Tienda y trastienda partner Ausencio Cruz. La caravana was a successful show with skits played by characters created by Trujillo and Cruz, with a comedy style calling back to the era of carpas. It featured characters such as Estetoscopio Medina Cháirez, played by Trujillo, representing a low-class Mexican guy with a funny accent who spoke ironically of the way of life of the poor. La caravana also marked the first on-air appearance of Brozo, where he told heavily modified fairy tales in front of the camera; these adaptations reflected the realities of crime and poverty in the "Mexican ghetto". The success of the two programs brought advertising revenues to Imevisión, which by the early 1990s was airing steadily more foreign productions. Trujillo later had a nighttime program as another character, La Beba Galván, this time without Cruz.

Trujillo continued with TV Azteca, Imevisión's successor, hosting programs including El Diario de la Noche until 2000. That year, he brought his act to Canal 40, where Brozo was host of his own news program called El Mañanero as an anchorman and political commentator. Trujillo criticized freely and poignantly the actors of the Mexican political scene, and soon his program received high ratings and featured high-profile politicians; it also began being simulcast on some Grupo ACIR radio stations.

=== Career at Televisa ===
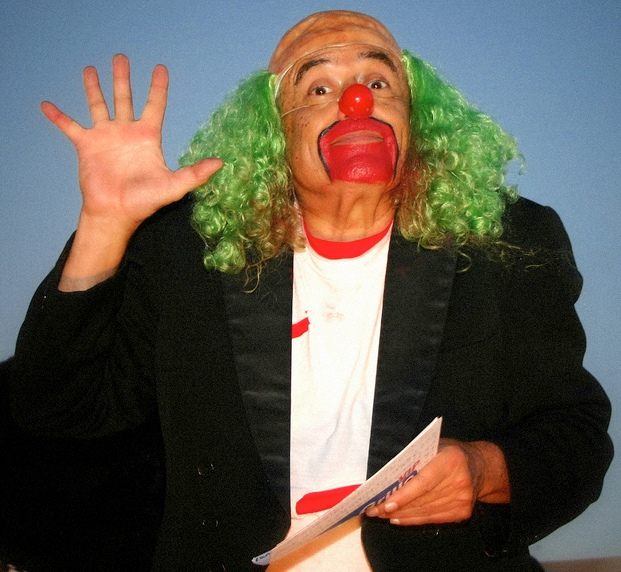
Trujillo as Brozo

In 2001, after 16 months, Trujillo left Canal 40 in order to sign a contract with Televisa and move his program to that network, which he said would allow him to take on a wider variety of projects. He later appeared on Televisa's coverage of the 2002 FIFA World Cup and hosted a season of Big Brother México.

Trujillo's character Brozo played an important role in the most damaging of the Videoscandals that affected the Mexico City mayor Andrés Manuel López Obrador. On El Mañanero, a video given to Trujillo by then-ALDF deputy Federico Döring Casar was aired, showing René Bejarano filling a briefcase with dollars given by entrepreneur Carlos Ahumada; this was followed immediately by a studio interview with an unsuspecting Bejarano, who saw the video for the first time on the spot. Trujillo would later be called on to testify in the criminal case that resulted.

After the 2004 death of Carolina Padilla (both his wife and his program's producer) due to a brain hemorrhage suffered the year before, Trujillo cancelled El Mañanero, stating that he was putting Brozo "in the freezer". Some time later, he started a new, similar show called El cristal con que se mira, this time as himself. In 2005, Trujillo caused the downfall of PRI presidential precandidate Arturo Montiel, when he announced as confirmed a current inquiry on Montiel's family and personal fortune. This inquiry was later denied by the government, but the damage was done, and Montiel quit the presidential race a few days later.

After El Cristal, along with El Circo de Brozo —a program that marked the return of the Brozo character— were cancelled in 2006, Trujillo (as Brozo) had another nighttime show called El Notifiero. In 2010, however, El Mañanero returned to the air, this time on Televisa's news channel FOROtv. It left the air in 2016 as part of a larger reorganization of Televisa's news output and to make way for a new weekly program on Canal 2.

=== Voice acting career ===
Trujillo has lent his voice to a variety of animated and other series, as well as Spanish-language dubs for the Mexican market. Among his more notable roles have been Biff Tannen in Back to the Future, Lion-O in ThunderCats, James Bond in On Her Majesty's Secret Service, Sulley in Monsters, Inc. and its prequel Monsters University, Shere Khan in the 2016 remake of The Jungle Book, Dr. Facilier in The Princess and the Frog and Bob Parr/Mr. Incredible in The Incredibles franchise.

== Other works ==
In 2006, Trujillo released Cuentos Tenebrozos, a collection of "true" short stories.
