= Rosario Robles =

Mexican politician

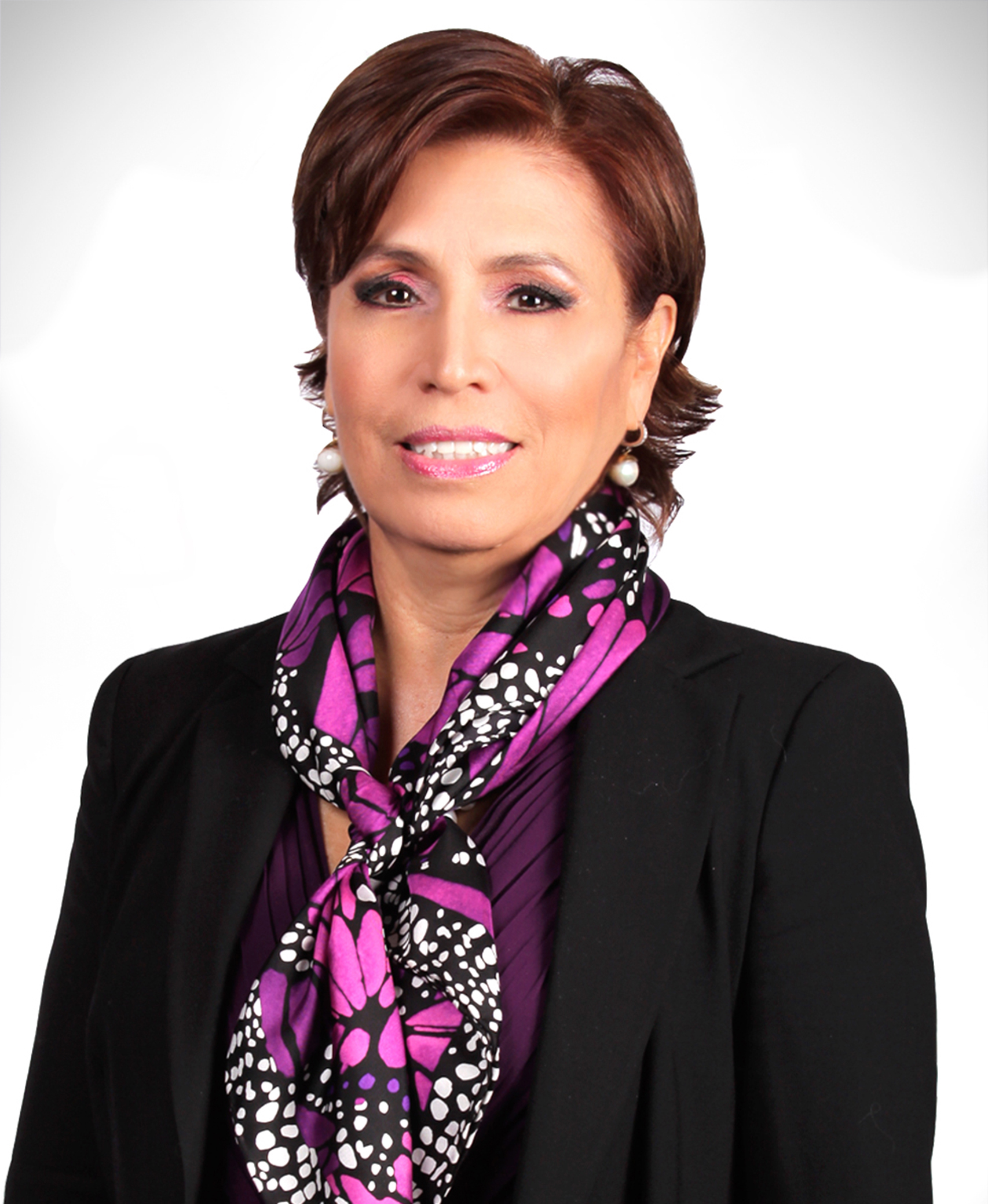

Secretary of Agrarian, Land, and Urban Development of Mexico
- In office 27 August 2015 – 30 November 2018
- President: Enrique Peña Nieto
- Preceded by: Jesús Murillo Karam
- Succeeded by: Román Meyer Falcón

Secretary of Social Development of Mexico
- In office 1 December 2012 – 27 August 2015
- President: Enrique Peña Nieto
- Preceded by: Heriberto Félix Guerra
- Succeeded by: José Antonio Meade

Head of Government of the Federal District
- Substitute
- In office 29 September 1999 – 4 December 2000
- Preceded by: Cuauhtémoc Cárdenas
- Succeeded by: Andrés Manuel López Obrador

Member of the Chamber of Deputies for the 2nd Circumscription
- In office 1 November 1994 – 31 August 1997

Personal details
- Born: 17 February 1956 (age 70) Mexico City, Mexico
- Party: Democratic Revolution Party
- Education: National Autonomous University of Mexico
- Occupation: Economist, politician

María del Rosario Robles Berlanga (Spanish: [roˈsaɾjo ˈroβles]; born 17 February 1956) is a Mexican politician who served as the Secretary of Social Development in the cabinet of President Enrique Peña Nieto. She also was substitute Head of Government of the Federal District (Mayor of Mexico City) when Cuauhtémoc Cárdenas resigned from the post to run in the 2000 presidential election. She was the first female mayor of Mexico City. She was a member of the Party of the Democratic Revolution (PRD).

== Career ==
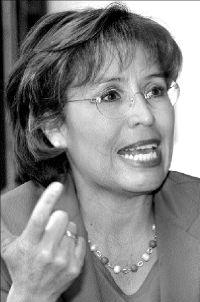
Robles interviewed about the decriminalization of abortion in Mexico City in 2000

Her term in office was highly controversial for an intensive media campaign in her government promoting her personal image, the high cost of which raised corruption concerns, and for introducing her political allies to entrepreneur Carlos Ahumada, who videotaped himself giving large amounts of cash to the politician René Bejarano. The scandals caused a major crisis for her party, the Partido de la Revolución Democrática (PRD). As a result, she subsequently resigned from the party. Carlos Ahumada was imprisoned, and René Bejarano is still free and active in politics via his wife Dolores Padierna.

Her successor as chief executive of the Federal District was Andrés Manuel López Obrador, of the same party who left after inconformity with the path the party was taking, and went into forming the MORENA party.

In 2005 she announced her intentions to run for the same office, although it is unclear under which party she would run, as her political image was affected by the videoscandals of that year. In the event, the election passed by without her participation.

In 2014 she announced that social help of the "Oportunidades" social program of SEDESOL will not be increased for mothers with more than three children, she said that the mothers have children to get more money from the program. This was criticized by left-wing parties.

Rosario Robles is currently involved in one of the biggest racketeering scandals: La Estafa Maestra (Master scam). The master scam is the name of a journalistic investigation conducted by the Mexican Animal Político news service in association with the Mexican civil society organization Against Corruption and Impunity. Published on 5 September 2017, the investigation unveiled a system of 128 ghost companies through which the federal government diverted more than 400 million dollars through a network of money diversions that involved 11 state agencies, eight public universities, various private companies and more than 50 public servants of different levels of government.

Political offices
Preceded by Cuauhtémoc Cárdenas Solórzano	Head of Government of the Federal District (interim); 1999–2000	Succeeded by Andrés Manuel López Obrador
Preceded by Amalia García Medina	President of the Party of the Democratic Revolution; 2002–2003	Succeeded by Leonel Godoy Rangel
Preceded by Heriberto Félix Guerra	Secretary of Social Development; 2012–2015	Succeeded by José Antonio Meade Kuribreña
Preceded by Jesús Murillo Karam	Secretary of Agrarian, Land, and Urban Development; 2015–2018	Succeeded by Román Meyer Falcón
