= Pio Colonnello =

Italian philosopher (born 1951)

Pio Colonnello (born February 12, 1951, in Benevento) is an Italian philosopher and university professor.

== Biography ==
Pio Colonnello has three degrees with honours in philosophy, in law and in humanities. In the academic year 1973/74 he won a scholarship at the "Istituto Italiano per gli Studi Storici", founded by Benedetto Croce, in Naples. Already a teacher in the Secondary School, from 1980 he has worked as researcher with tenure at the Department of Philosophy "A. Aliotta" of the University of Naples "Federico II". From 2001, he works as Professor of Theoretical Philosophy at the Faculty of Humanities of Calabria University.

He has collaborated with others on some philosophical reviews: Kant Studien, Criterio, Filosofia Oggi, Nord e Sud, Sapienza, Choros, Studi Kantiani, Zeitschrift für philosophische Forschung, The Journal of Value Inquiry (of which he is also Consulting Editor). He is member of the Scientific Committee of important philosophical reviews.

He is visiting professor at the Universidad Autónoma de Mèxico, at the Universidad Nacional Autónoma de México (Ciudad de México) and at the California State University, Northridge. He has organized many national and international Congresses.

He twice obtained the "Premio della Cultura" of the Ministers' Council Presidency. In the month of November 2007, he obtained the International Prize of Culture "Salvatore Valitutti".

Pio Colonnello has privileged some themes of research: the investigation on authors and themes included between transcendental criticism and phenomenological thought (by Kant to Husserl); the reflections on the fundamentals problems of philosophy of existence and of contemporary hermeneutics (Heidegger, Jaspers, Ricœur, Pareyson, Arendt); the analysis of some positions of the contemporary historicism between Europe and Latin America (Croce, Ortega y Gasset, Gaos, Ímaz, Nicol, Düssel). His proposal is to verify the interaction, in a historical and critical view, of the fundamental themes of Kantism, phenomenology and philosophy of existence.

== Bibliography ==
- Heidegger interprete di Kant, Studio Editoriale di Cultura, Genova, 1981.
- Croce e i vociani, Studio Editoriale di Cultura, Genova, 1984.
- Tempo e necessità, Japadre, L'Aquila-Roma, 1987.
- Tra fenomenologia e filosofia dell'esistenza. Saggio su José Gaos, Morano, Napoli, 1990 (translated in English and Spanish: The Philosophy of José Gaos, Rodopi, Amsterdam-Atlanta, 1997; Entre fenomenologia y filosofia de la existencia. Ensayo sobre José Gaos, Jitajanfora Morelia Editorial, Morelia México, 2006).
- La questione della colpa tra filosofia dell'esistenza ed ermeneutica, Loffredo, Napoli, 1995.
- Percorsi di confine. Analisi dell'esistenza e filosofia della libertà, Luciano, Napoli, 1999.
- Croce e Dewey oggi (with G. Spadafora), Bibliopolis, Napoli, 2002.
- Ragione e rivelazione (with con P. Giustiniani), Borla, Roma, 2003.
- Melanconia ed esistenza, Luciano, Napoli, 2003.
- Filosofia e politica in America latina (edited by Pio Colonnello), Armando, Roma, 2005.
- Itinerari di filosofia ispanoamericana, Armando, Roma, 2007.
- Storia esistenza liberta. Rileggendo Croce, Armando, Roma, 2009.
- Martin Heidegger e Hannah Arendt, Guida, Napoli, 2009 (translated in Spanish: Martin Heidegger y Hannah Arendt, Ediciones del Signo, Buenos Aires, 2010).
