= Videoscandals =

2004 Mexican political scandals

The Videoscandals (Spanish: Videoescándalos) were political scandals in Mexico in 2004 when videos of prominent politicians taken with hidden cameras were made public. The majority of them involved politicians in corrupt dealings with former business man Carlos Ahumada, and another showed a politician spending money in Las Vegas.

== The videos ==
The videos are listed in order of chronological appearance on television.

=== Jorge Emilio González ===
The first video shown on national television was of Jorge Emilio González Martínez, the Ecologist Green Party of Mexico (PVEM) leader (a long time ally of the PRI party). He was taped by one of his own party members, who introduced him to the businessman interested in the project, allegedly negotiating a $2 million bribe in cash to assist in the development of a hotel in an ecologically protected area. The three met at the PVEM headquarters.

During an interview with Grupo Reforma, Emilio talked about some accusations: his involvement with a Bulgarian woman's death, which happened inside one of his properties located in Emerald, Cancún

=== Gustavo Ponce ===
Mexico City's finance chief, Gustavo Ponce, was filmed gambling at the Bellagio Hotel in Las Vegas, Nevada, USA.

=== René Bejarano ===
The second scandal came when René Bejarano, previously López Obrador's personal secretary, later elected to the Mexico City legislature, was videotaped accepting USD $45,000 in cash. The video got to the hands of Congress member Federico Döring who took it and had it shown on March 3, 2004 at Victor Trujillo's news program (which he hosted as his Brozo character).

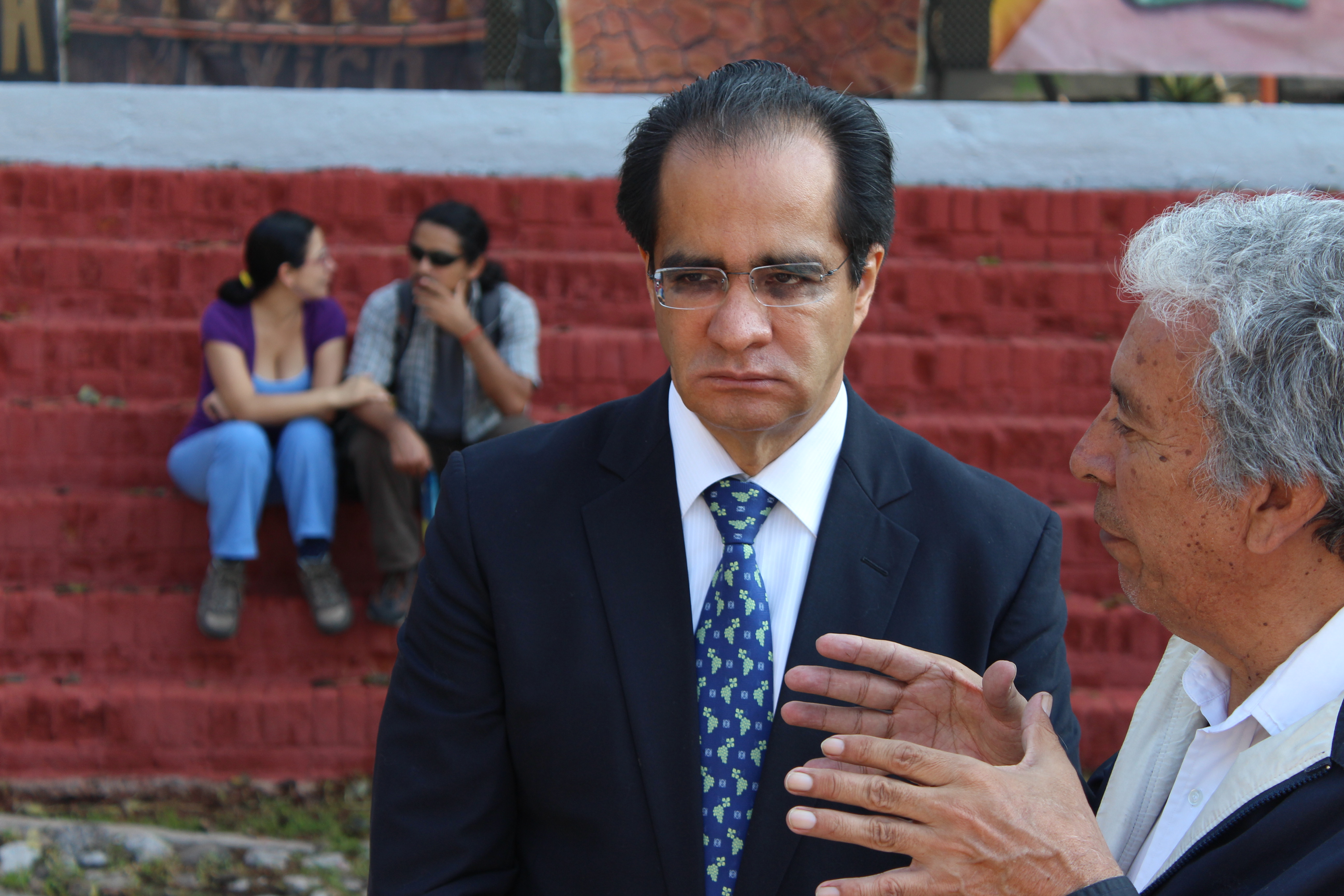
René Bejarano

Subsequently, Bejarano again appeared in another video, negotiating with Ahumada the assignment of public positions in the Álvaro Obregón delegation.

=== Carlos Ímaz ===
The delegate of Tlalpan (a district within Mexico City), Carlos Ímaz, was also shown receiving money from Carlos Ahumada. A judge sentenced him to 3 years and 6 months in prison, however, the penalty was replaced by a fine of 100 thousand pesos. His wife at the time was Claudia Sheinbaum, who would be elected President of Mexico in 2024.
