= Albur =

Mexican Spanish form of word play

An albur (plural: albures) is a word play in Mexican Spanish that involves a double entendre.

The first meaning in the Spanish language of albur refers to contingency or chance to which the result is trusted. Like in: "Leave nothing to the albur" or "it was worth the risk of an albur". The term originally referred to the hidden cards in the Spanish Monte betting card game. The word albur is also synonym to uncertainty or random luck "Es un albur".

It is very common among groups of male friends in Mexico, especially urban youth, construction workers, factory workers, mechanics and other blue collar-derivative male groups; and is considered rude otherwise, especially when in the presence of women, given the sexual innuendo in the jokes. Its usage is similar to the English expressions: "If you know what I mean" and "that's what she said". Albur is also a form of comedy and many stand-up artists and comedians, including Alberto Rojas "El Caballo", Polo Polo, Franco Escamilla and others are renowned for their skills at performing albures on drunk bullies and hecklers attending their shows (alburear). Brozo has been known for performing albures on several prominent political figures in Mexican television such as Mexico's former president, Felipe Calderón.

The game of albures is usually a subtle, verbal competition in which the players try to show superiority by using albures attempting to leave the opponent without a comeback. Most albures have to do with sex, but they also can be just generally degrading, as with comparing the target's stupidity to that of a donkey, ox, or mule.

Specific purposes of the albur can include:

- To show off the alburero's masculinity by making a remark of him being the aggressor (or male active party) in sexual intercourse
- To imply (subtly or bluntly) the opponent's (albureado) lack of virility by stating him to be the "victim" (female or passive receiver) in a sexual encounter. In the context of an albur, the receptive side of the sexual intercourse is considered to be the losing side while the male, giving, active side is the winner. This applies regardless of whether it is male to male or male to female intercourse.

== Social aspects ==
=== Classes ===
Albures are commonplace in many sectors of Mexican society and are usually regarded as a sign of a witty and agile (though somewhat dirty) mind. It is possible to find people who brag about their skills (at albures) and claim to be "good at it", this phrase being itself an albur (also a self-reference to their virility and sexual power). The albures can be subtle or explicit depending on the author's intention, they are commonly found in almost every Mexican social sector being more common in low-class sectors, but present in higher ones also. However people may sometimes categorize those who use albures as nacos, which is a way of saying "you are despicable for being an urban but uneducated person, whose family comes from the rural poor areas of the country".

Though at first sight outsiders may see albures as a very rude, distasteful, blunt and aggressive activity, it is usually nothing more than a pastime which promotes laughter and is an excuse to joke around with friends. An important aspect of the refinement of an albur exchange is the level at which it can be seen as a double entendre. The most refined albureros can maintain a double entendre conversation in such a way that an unprepared listener would not even realize there was an underlying sexual connotation. In such a case that person would find the giggling, blushing and pausing awkward.

It sometimes happens that a newcomer is "welcomed" into a group or conversation with a quick and unexpected albur. This behaviour tends to immediately set who is the (sexual) aggressor, thus being a form to establish a male hierarchy. A quick comeback gains recognition of the group, though this is seldom expected, due to shyness, surprise, lack of ability to recognize the albur, or lack of ability to produce an answer. For example, at a diner with friends someone saying, "cómetela entera" ('eat it all'), might be jokingly insinuating "you should perform fellatio", an agile mind would give a retaliatory double entendre answer like, "I don't like it, but you can eat mine if you like" ('A mí no me gusta, pero tú cómete la mía si se te antoja').

=== Women ===
Women play a crucial role in the language and focus of albures. While the alburero would attempt to show the albureado as the bottom (passive sexual partner, pasivo), he could as well name the female relatives of the albureado, namely sisters or, in case of great confidence, mother. However, it's a known fact that many Mexicans are over-reactive to this type of reference and might be more easily moved to a physically violent response than by any other type of albur, or even overt insults.

However, in the case of female albureras (female albur performers), the situation becomes quite complicated for the male albur performer, as the general counterattack strategy would be exhibiting the adversary as a sexual bottom, but women in albur are not trying to prove virility, only mental sharpness, and that type of attack does no harm. In this case, if the albureado has no comeback line, he suffers a double humiliation since he would not be able to respond to the albur, and he would also have been defeated by a woman, which makes it more humiliating for the macho Mexican mind among of a group of males.

== Language and structure ==
Albures can make use of several aspects of (empirical, innate) linguistic knowledge. For example, the phallic shape of the chili pepper adds a double meaning to the question, asked of a tourist, "Do you like Mexican chili?"

=== Phonetic ===
Many albures originate from similarities in the pronunciation of different words:

- "Dame la hora" ('Give me the time -- what time is it?')

which sounds like: Dámela ahora ('Give it to me now'), a phrase which can connote "it" as being either the vagina or the anus, and therefore constituting an albur.

=== Polysemy ===
Others make use of the fact that a word may have several meanings, one of which will be exploited.

For example, a Mexican bus driver may ask a passenger about la parada, which can mean both "the stop" and "the erected one". Therefore, a wary passenger should be careful not to reply, e.g., "al tope", which can mean "at the speedbump" but also "the whole thing" or "until it stops".

=== Pronominal references ===
When the antecedent for a pronoun is substituted for a sexual reference the simplest (cheapest) form of albures can be achieved.

Using the same example as above,

- "Dámela ahora" ('Give it to me now').

Several examples can be easily constructed where the previous conversation would include antecedents for the clitic pronoun "-la" [fem, sing], and the albur comeback would re-reference it to mean the penis (among the several synonyms for penis, there are some with the correct gender and number agreement).

=== Generalization of meaning/context ===
- a) Eres un tonto. ('You are dumb.')
- b) Te veo triste. ('I see that you are sad.')

In this exchange, the interesting aspect is that b's response mechanism is simply to substitute the out-of-context "sad" for a's accusation. B's response would effectively be interpreted as "I see that you are dumb".

Some of the most renowned masters of the albur are "Chaf y Queli", who made several records in the 1970s under the "Discos Diablo" label.

Armando Jiménez, who wrote Picardía mexicana, made a compilation of albures and other mexicanisms.

== See also ==
- Ambiguity
- Mexican culture
- Pun
- Spanish profanity
- Armando Jiménez article in Spanish Wikipedia
