= Annie Pardo Cemo =

Mexican cell biologist (born 1940)

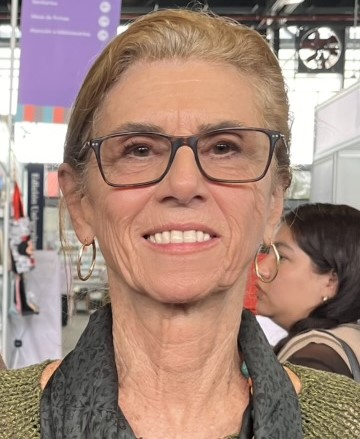
- Pardo in 2025
- Born: 6 June 1940 (age 86); Mexico City, Mexico
- Education: National Autonomous University of Mexico
- Occupation: Cell biologist
- Spouse: Carlos Sheinbaum Yoselevitz (m. 1960; died 2013)
- Children: 3, including Claudia Sheinbaum

Annie Pardo Cemo (born 6 June 1940) is a Mexican cell biologist specializing in the study of the extracellular matrix. She is a member of the Sistema Nacional de Investigadores and received the National Prize for Arts and Sciences in 2023. She is the mother of Mexican President Claudia Sheinbaum Pardo.

== Early life ==
Annie Pardo Cemo was born in Mexico City on 6 June 1940. Her parents, Mati Magdalena Semo Calev and Jose Pardo Benjaminoff, were Sephardic Jews from Sofia, Bulgaria. As a result of the persecution of Jews in Bulgaria, Pardo's parents emigrated to Mandatory Palestine and then they arrived in Mexico shortly before her birth.

In 1960, she married chemical engineer Carlos Sheinbaum Yoselevitz, with whom she had three children: Julio, Claudia, and Adriana. The couple participated in the Mexican Movement of 1968.

== Academic career ==
Annie Pardo studied biology at the Faculty of Sciences of the National Autonomous University of Mexico. She also completed her master's and doctoral degrees in biochemistry at the same university. She conducted research stays at the American universities of Washington University in St. Louis; at the University of Illinois Chicago, and at the pathology department of the Baylor College of Medicine in Houston, Texas.

In 1980, she founded the biochemistry research laboratory at the Faculty of Sciences of UNAM. She was a "C-level" professor at the Faculty of Sciences of the National Autonomous University of Mexico and was named a "level III researcher" of the Sistema Nacional de Investigadores.

In May 2023, she received the National Prize for Arts and Sciences in the category of physical-mathematical and natural sciences for "her research in biochemistry, lung diseases, and aging studies".

== Controversies ==
=== Panama Papers ===
Annie Pardo Cemo's name appeared in the Panama Papers, a leak of documents related to companies registered in tax havens. According to the documentation, Pardo Cemo opened multiple bank accounts between March 1990 and November 2009 in various tax havens, and had links to the company JAEM Ltd., a consortium based in the British Virgin Islands considered "an entity facilitating tax evasion and fortune concealment through tax havens".

=== Actual birthplace controversy and allegation of forged documents ===
According to official Mexican birth registry documents, Annie Pardo Cemo was born in Mexico City on 6 June 1940, but this was a late registration that is dated to have happened on 31 December 1940 (6 months and 3 weeks after her birth), which is the last day of the year and the final entry in the 1940 birth register—a fact that could suggest her entry was improperly included in the 1940 register, given that documentation shows her family did not arrive in the Americas until 1946, specifically in New York City, coming from Tel Aviv (which was under British administration at the time), with no record of them in Mexico until 1950, making it impossible for Pardo to have been born on Mexican soil. This suggests that her birth certificate was possibly forged or obtained years later through a false declaration; therefore, it is likely that Annie was actually born in Bulgaria, her parents’ country of origin, or in Tel Aviv, from where her family emigrated.
