= Schönbaum =

Schönbaum or Schoenbaum (pronounced [ˈʃøːnbaʊm], lit. 'beautiful tree') is a German surname. Notable people with the surname include:

- Alex Schoenbaum (1915–1996), American football player and businessman
- Charles Schoenbaum (1893–1951), cinematographer
- David Schoenbaum (born 1935), American social scientist
- Samuel Schoenbaum (1927–1996), Shakespearean biographer and scholar

== See also ==
- Sheinbaum (surname)
- Schoenbaum Stadium, soccer stadium in Charleston, West Virginia
