= Polo Polo =

Mexican comedian (1944 – 2023)

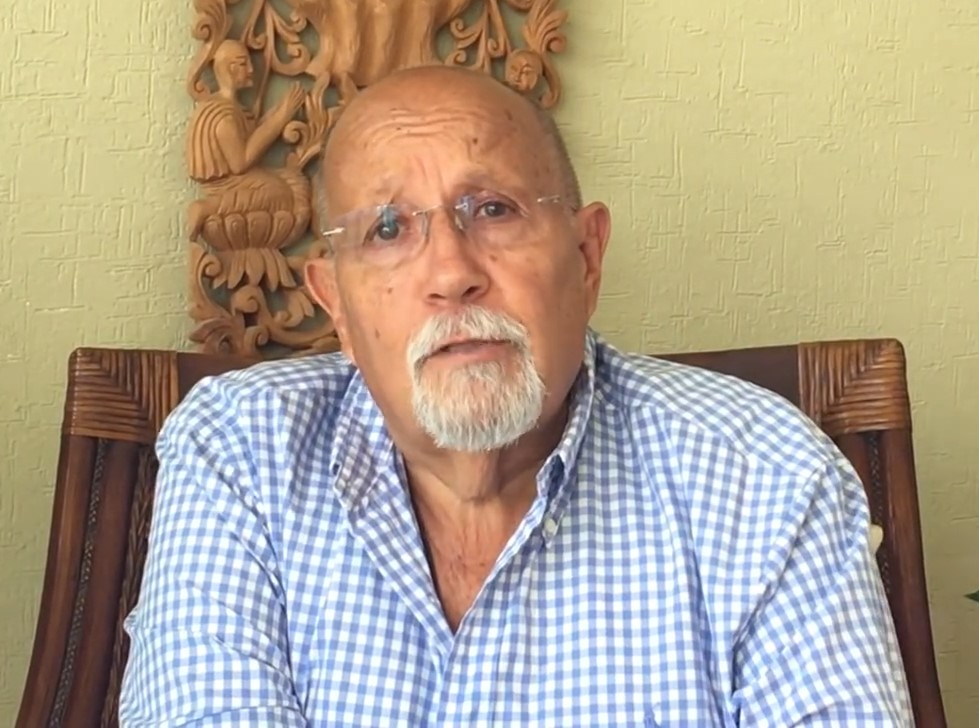
- Polo Polo in 2016
- Born: Leopoldo Roberto García Peláez Benítez; 9 March 1944; León, Guanajuato, Mexico
- Died: 23 January 2023 (aged 78); Cuernavaca, Morelos, Mexico

Leopoldo Roberto García Peláez Benítez (9 March 1944 – 23 January 2023), also known as Polo Polo, was a Mexican stand-up comedian. His first‑person anecdotes often featured explicit sexual language, wordplay, and double entendres aimed at adult audiences.

== Biography ==
Leopoldo was born in León, Guanajuato, Mexico, into a family of shoemakers. Polo Polo worked as a shoe-factory executive in Mexico City before beginning his comedy career. He became known for his comedy while working at Keops Nightclub in the 1960s. In the 1970s, he began performing at small clubs and bars.

During the 1980s, Polo Polo appeared on several late-night television programs in Mexico. For many consecutive years, Polo Polo performed at the "Keops" nightclub; in 1986, he had the opportunity to perform at the largest venue in Mexico at the time, the Crown Hall at the Hotel Crowne Plaza. Additionally, he recorded his first live album with the Musart record label, titled The Trip to Spain. Despite a lack of radio airplay due to the explicit "blue" content, the album sold over 100,000 copies.

On 3 and 4 December 1994, Polo Polo performed two shows at the Grand Olympic Auditorium in Los Angeles, California, with record-breaking attendance. He also played at the Sahara Hotel & Casino, the Universal Amphitheatre, and the Celebrity Theatre. In Mexico, he performed at venues including the Premier, the Patio, and the Teatro Blanquita.

Polo Polo participated in the 2004 program "La Escuelita VIP," produced by fellow comedian Jorge Ortiz de Pinedo. Polo Polo died on 23 January 2023, at the age of 78.

== See also ==
- Albur
