= Claudia Sheinbaum =

President of Mexico since 2024

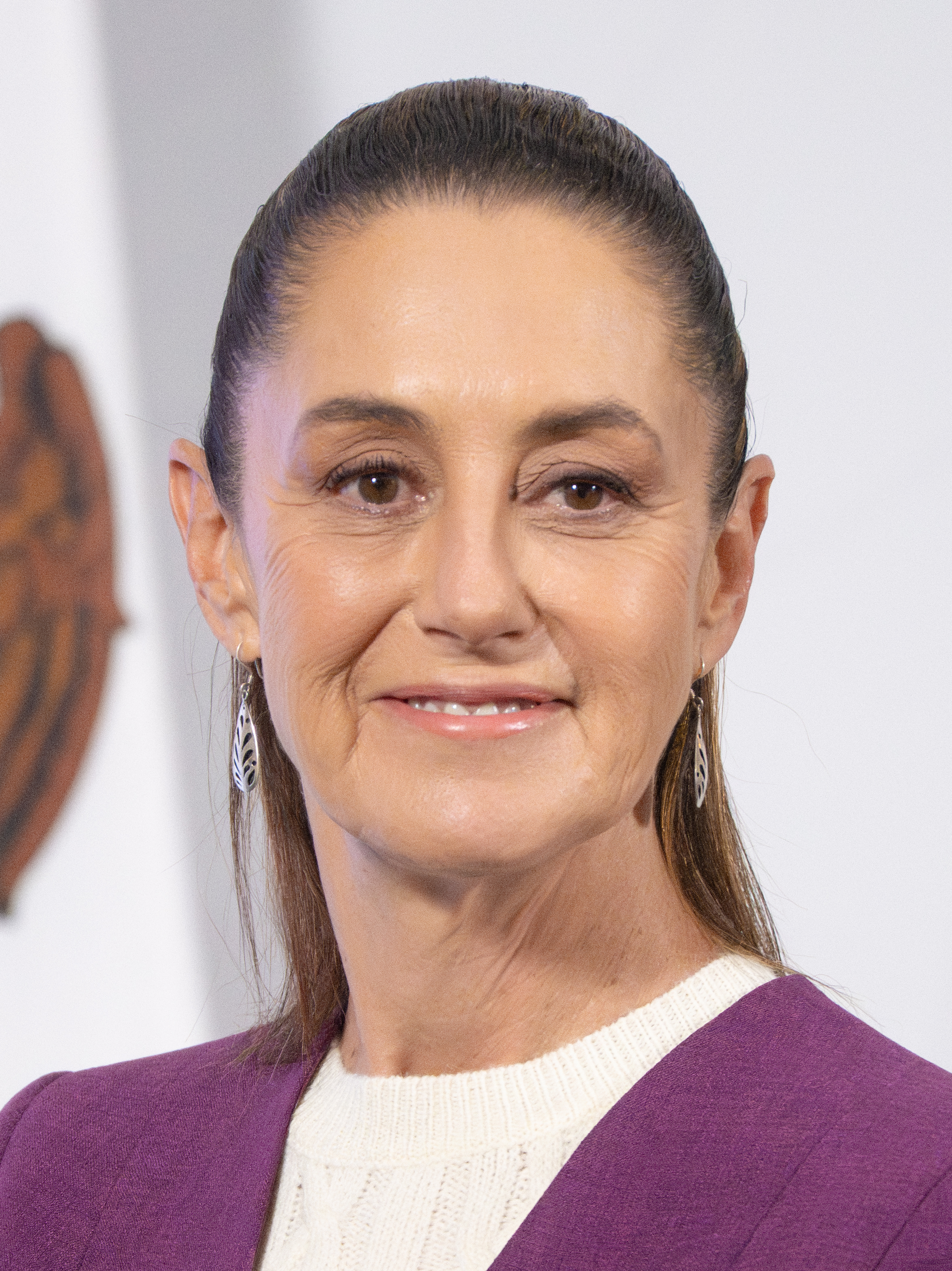
- Sheinbaum in 2025

66th President of Mexico
- Incumbent
- Assumed office 1 October 2024
- Preceded by: Andrés Manuel López Obrador

Head of Government of Mexico City
- In office 5 December 2018 – 16 June 2023
- Preceded by: José Ramón Amieva
- Succeeded by: Martí Batres

Mayor of Tlalpan
- In office 1 October 2015 – 6 December 2017
- Preceded by: Héctor Hugo Hernández Rodríguez
- Succeeded by: Fernando Hernández Palacios

Secretary of the Environment of the Federal District
- In office 5 December 2000 – 15 May 2006
- Head of Government: Andrés Manuel López Obrador; Alejandro Encinas Rodríguez
- Preceded by: Alejandro Encinas Rodríguez
- Succeeded by: Eduardo Vega López

Personal details
- Born: Claudia Sheinbaum Pardo; 24 June 1962 (age 64) Mexico City, Mexico
- Party: National Regeneration Movement (since 2014)
- Other political affiliations: Party of the Democratic Revolution (1989–2014)
- Spouses: Carlos Ímaz Gispert (m. 1987; div. 2016); Jesús María Tarriba (m. 2023)
- Children: 1
- Parents: Carlos Sheinbaum Yoselevitz (father); Annie Pardo Cemo (mother)
- Education: National Autonomous University of Mexico (Lic., MS, Dr.)
- Occupation: Politician
- Profession: Scientist; academician
- Scientific career
- Fields: Energy conservation, energy policy, sustainable development
- Workplaces: National Autonomous University of Mexico

Claudia Sheinbaum Pardo (Note: English pronunciation: /ˈklaʊdiə ˈʃeɪnbɔːm/ KLOW-dee-ə SHAYN-bawm; Latin American Spanish pronunciation: [ˈklawðja ˈʃejmbawm ˈpaɾðo].) (born 24 June 1962) is a Mexican politician, energy and climate change scientist, and academic who has been serving as the 66th president of Mexico since 2024. She is the first woman and the first person of Jewish (Note: Carlos Salinas de Gortari, president of Mexico from 1988 to 1994, is of partial colonial-era Sephardic Jewish descent.) heritage to hold the office. A member of the National Regeneration Movement (Morena), she previously served as Head of Government of Mexico City from 2018 to 2023. In 2025, Forbes ranked Sheinbaum as the fifth most powerful woman in the world.

A scientist by profession, Sheinbaum received her doctorate in energy engineering from the National Autonomous University of Mexico (UNAM). She has co-authored over 100 articles and two books on energy, the environment, and sustainable development. She contributed to the Intergovernmental Panel on Climate Change and, in 2018, was named one of BBC's 100 Women. She was subsequently awarded the Sustainability Medal by the Nobel Sustainability Trust in 2024.

Sheinbaum joined the Party of the Democratic Revolution (PRD) in 1989. From 2000 to 2006, she served as secretary of the environment in the Federal District under Andrés Manuel López Obrador. She left the PRD in 2014 to join López Obrador's splinter movement, Morena, and was elected mayor of Tlalpan borough in 2015. In 2018, she became Head of Government of Mexico City, focusing on security, public transport, and social programs, while also overseeing major crises such as the COVID-19 pandemic and the Mexico City Metro overpass collapse. She resigned in 2023 to run for president and won Morena's nomination over Marcelo Ebrard. In the 2024 presidential election, she defeated Xóchitl Gálvez in a landslide.

As president, Sheinbaum enacted a series of constitutional reforms with the support of her legislative supermajority, including enshrining social programs into the Constitution, reversing key aspects of the 2013 energy reform to strengthen state control over the energy sector, mandating that the minimum wage increase be above the rate of inflation, and introducing universal healthcare.

== Early life and family ==
Claudia Sheinbaum Pardo was born on 24 June 1962 in Mexico City, within a Mexican Jewish religiously unobservant family. She is the second child of chemist Carlos Sheinbaum Yoselevitz and biologist Annie Pardo Cemo.

Carlos Sheinbaum was of Ashkenazi Jewish descent. His father, Chone Juan Sheinbaum Abramovitz, had emigrated from Lithuania in 1928, becoming a jewelry merchant and a member of the Mexican Communist Party. Annie Pardo is from a Sephardi Jewish family who arrived in Mexico in 1946, after fleeing from the persecution of Jews in Bulgaria during World War II. Pardo became the first Sephardic woman to be an academic at the Instituto Politécnico Nacional.

Sheinbaum's parents were actively involved in Mexican left-wing circles during the 1960s, participating in protests, workers' movements, and student uprisings.

Sheinbaum has two siblings. Her older brother, Julio, is a physicist and physical oceanography researcher at CICESE. Her younger sister, Adriana, is a teacher who lives in the United States and is married to film director Rodrigo García Barcha, a son of Colombian writer and Nobel laureate Gabriel García Márquez.

== Academic career ==
Sheinbaum earned a bachelor's degree in physics at UNAM in 1989, a master's degree in 1994, and a Ph.D. in energy engineering in 1995.

Sheinbaum completed the work for her Ph.D. thesis between 1991 and 1994 at the Lawrence Berkeley National Laboratory in California. While working for the laboratory, she analyzed energy use in the Mexican transportation sector and published studies on the trends in Mexican building energy use.

In 1995, Sheinbaum joined the faculty of the Institute of Engineering at UNAM. In 1999, she received the prize for being the best UNAM young researcher in engineering and technological innovation.

In 2006, Sheinbaum returned to UNAM after a period in government and began publishing articles in scientific journals.

In 2007, Sheinbaum contributed to the "Industry" chapter of the WG3 (Mitigation) section in the Fourth Assessment Report of the Intergovernmental Panel on Climate Change (IPCC) and, in 2013, served as a lead author for the chapter in the IPCC Fifth Assessment Report.

== Early political career ==
During her time as a student at UNAM, Sheinbaum was a member of the University Student Council (Consejo Estudiantil Universitario), a group of students that would become the founding youth movement of the Party of the Democratic Revolution (PRD).

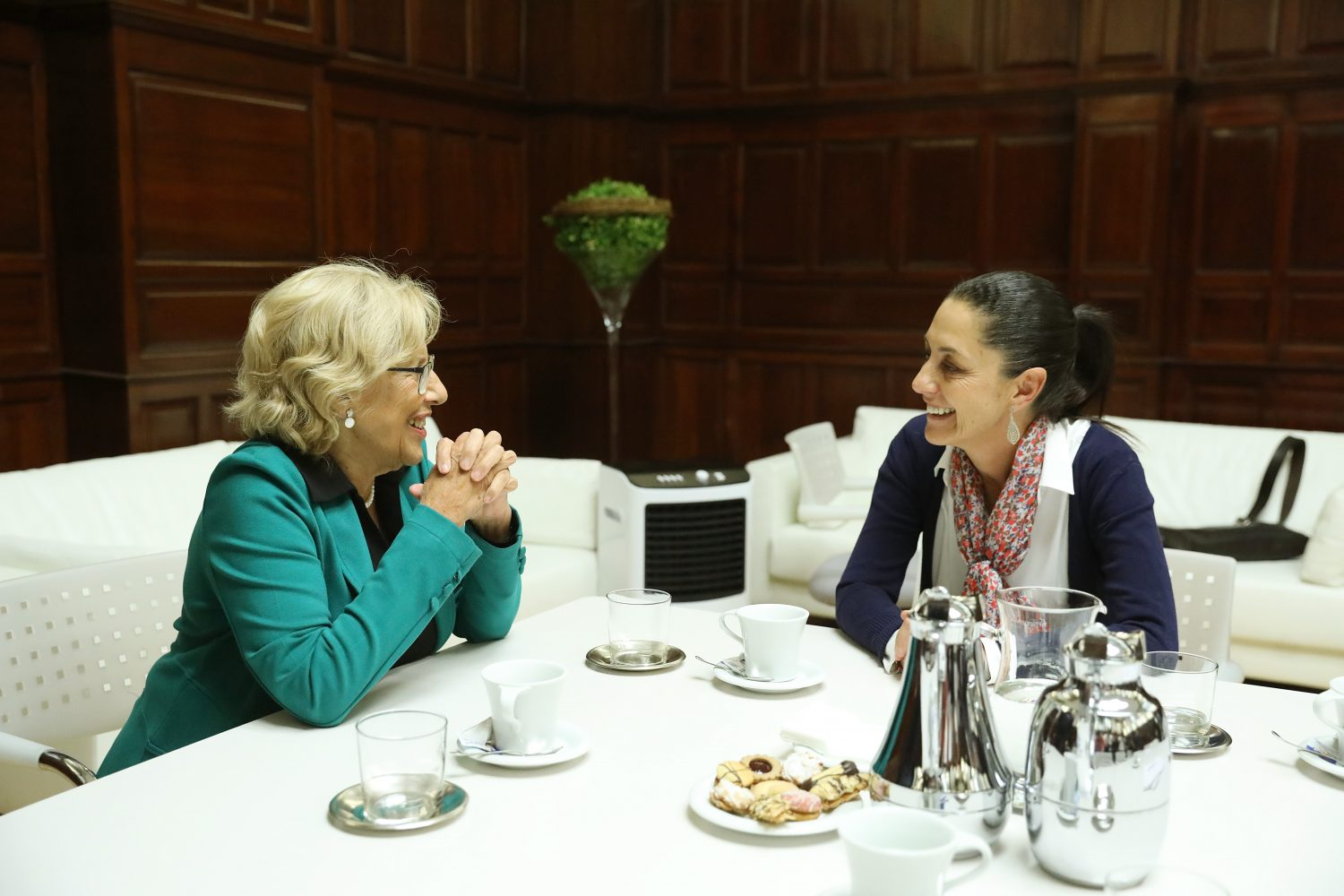
Madrid mayor Manuela Carmena meets with Sheinbaum at the Cibeles Palace

Sheinbaum served as the secretary of the environment of the Federal District from 5 December 2000 to 15 May 2006, appointed by Head of Government of the Federal District Andrés Manuel López Obrador. During her term, she was responsible for constructing an electronic vehicle registration center for Mexico City. She also oversaw the introduction of the Metrobús, a bus rapid transit system with dedicated lanes, and the construction of the second storey of Mexico City's ring road, Anillo Periférico.

Following López Obrador’s narrow loss in the 2006 presidential election, Sheinbaum was tasked with assembling a team to investigate what he described as electoral fraud. The group analyzed tally sheets and used data from the Preliminary Electoral Results Program (PREP), concluding that the main irregularity was the alleged alteration of vote totals on polling station records. Sheinbaum also presented video evidence of alleged violations, including tampered ballot packages and improperly sealed envelopes, in several districts. The findings were submitted to the Electoral Tribunal of the Federal Judiciary (TEPJF) as part of a request for a full recount, which the tribunal ultimately denied.

López Obrador included Sheinbaum in his proposed cabinet for the Secretariat of Environment and Natural Resources as part of his campaign for the 2012 presidential election. In 2014, she joined López Obrador's splinter movement, the National Regeneration Movement (Morena), which broke away from the mainstream left-wing party, the Party of the Democratic Revolution.

=== Mayor of Tlalpan ===
In the 2015 Federal District local elections, Sheinbaum was nominated by the National Regeneration Movement (Morena) for the mayorship of Tlalpan. She campaigned on a platform focused on improving public services and public spaces, reducing corruption, and implementing social programs for women and young adults. She won with 29.48% of the vote, flipping the borough from the Party of the Democratic Revolution (PRD), which had governed the borough since 2000.

On 29 April 2016, city staff were ordered to demolish a wall that had been built illegally adjacent to a chapel (Capilla del Señor de los Trabajos) in Tlalpan's Cultura Maya neighborhood. The workers instructed to demolish the wall also destroyed part of the chapel's structure, including its sheet metal roof, and removed religious images. Juan Guillermo Blandón Pérez, the parish priest, alleged that Sheinbaum was responsible for demolishing the chapel and claimed that it was carried out without prior notification. Days after the chapel's demolition, borough authorities acknowledged their error. Sheinbaum met with church representatives and proposed dividing the property in half to build a new chapel and a community art center.

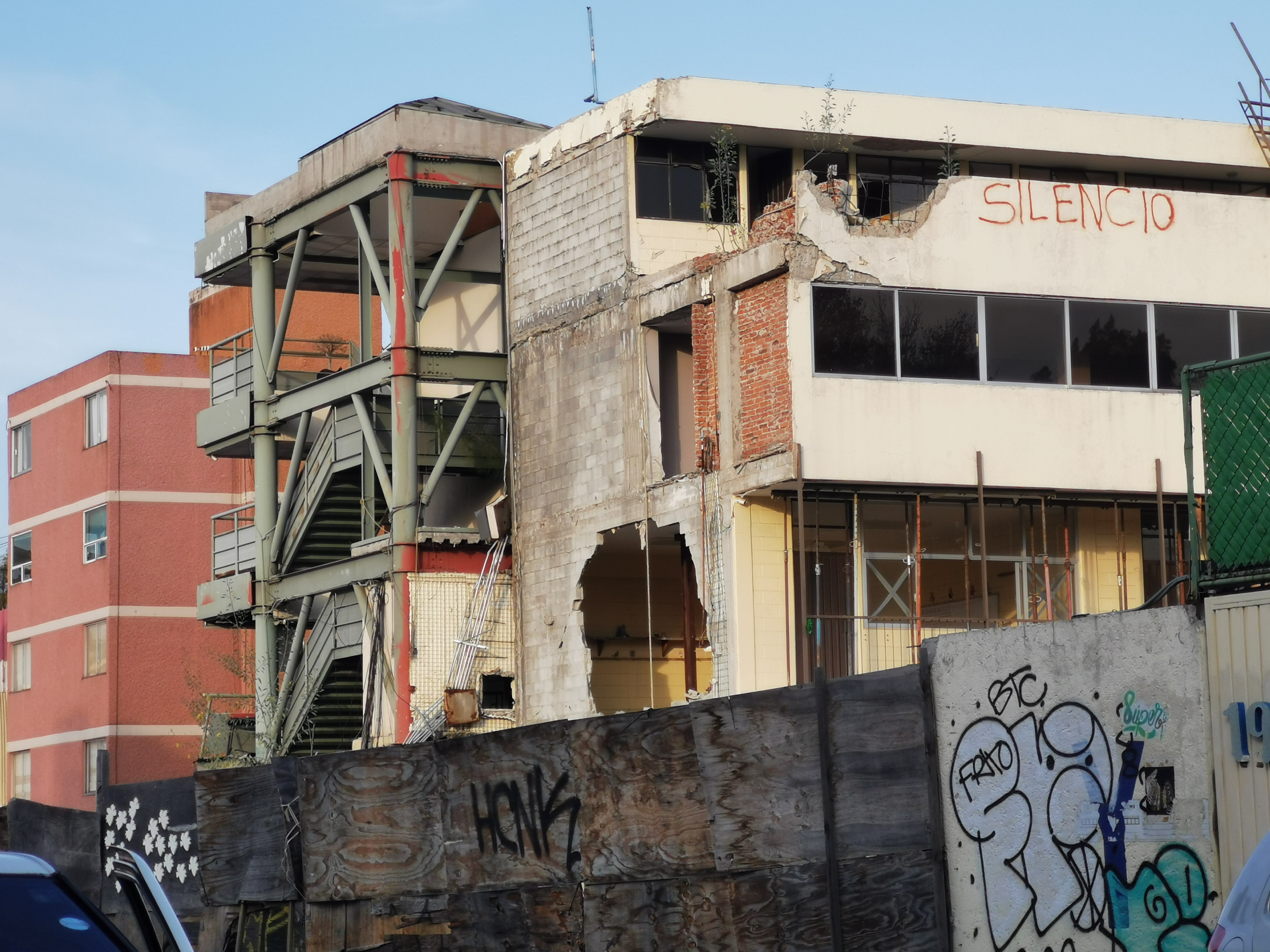
Earthquake damage to the Enrique Rébsamen School

The Colegio Enrique Rébsamen, a private school in Tlalpan, collapsed during the 2017 Puebla earthquake, killing 19 children and seven adults. In September 2016, the city's Institute for Administrative Verification had ruled that the school's building infringed zoning regulations and was built higher than was allowed and that the owner, Mónica García Villegas, had presented falsified documents. Sheinbaum faced criticism for not providing a complete account of the permits for the school's land use, construction, and operation. Enrique Fuentes, a lawyer representing the deceased children's parents, stated that the mayor had an obligation to take action but had failed to do so, allowing the school to continue operating.

On 5 December 2017, Sheinbaum resigned to run for Head of Government of Mexico City as a candidate for the Juntos Haremos Historia coalition (lit. 'Together We Will Make History'), composed of Morena, the Labor Party (PT), and the Social Encounter Party (PES).

== 2018 campaign for the Head of Government of Mexico City ==
Election results by borough in the 2018 election for the Head of Government of Mexico City

In August 2017, Sheinbaum participated in a poll by the National Regeneration Movement to determine the party's candidate for the head of government of Mexico City. The other contenders were Martí Batres, Mario Delgado, and Ricardo Monreal. Sheinbaum secured first place with 15.9% of the vote, beating her closest opponent, Batres, by 5.8 points. On 5 December 2017, Sheinbaum stepped down as mayor of Tlalpan to register her pre-candidacy.

At her campaign launch on 1 April 2018, Sheinbaum prioritized fighting crime, stating that she would hold regular public hearings, publish reported crime statistics, and rely on the Security Council for guidance. She committed to generating 1 million jobs during her term, maintaining the universal pension for seniors, and expanding the Mexico City Metrobús system to connect the city's outskirts with the center.

During the campaign period, Sheinbaum was accused by members of Por México al Frente of being culpable for the collapse of the Colegio Enrique Rébsamen, a private school in Tlalpan, during the 2017 Puebla earthquake.

On 1 July 2018, Sheinbaum was elected to a six-year term as the head of government of Mexico City with 47.08% of the vote, defeating six other candidates.

== Head of Government of Mexico City (2018–2023) ==
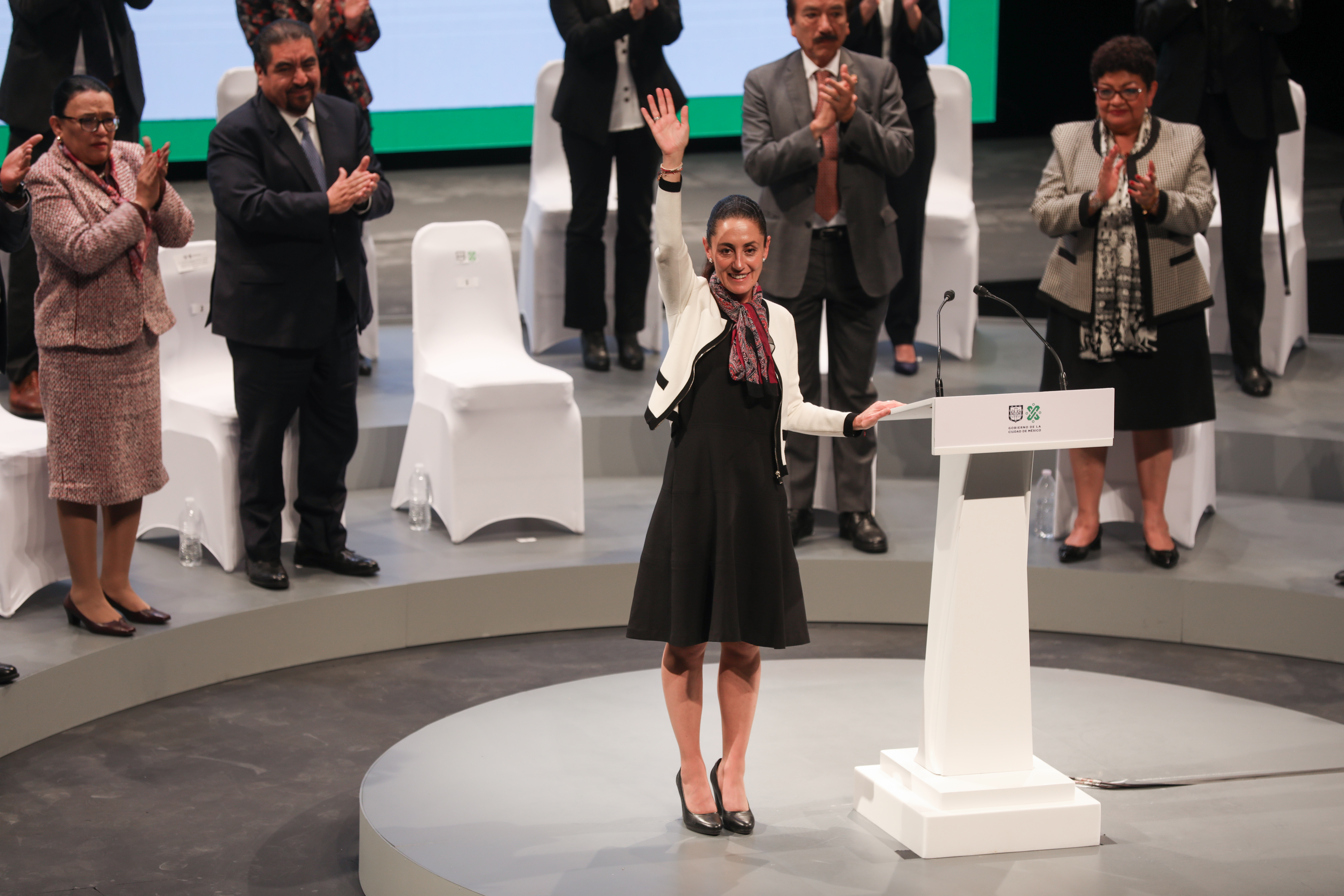
After taking charge as head of government, Claudia Sheinbaum went to the Teatro de la Ciudad to present her cabinet.

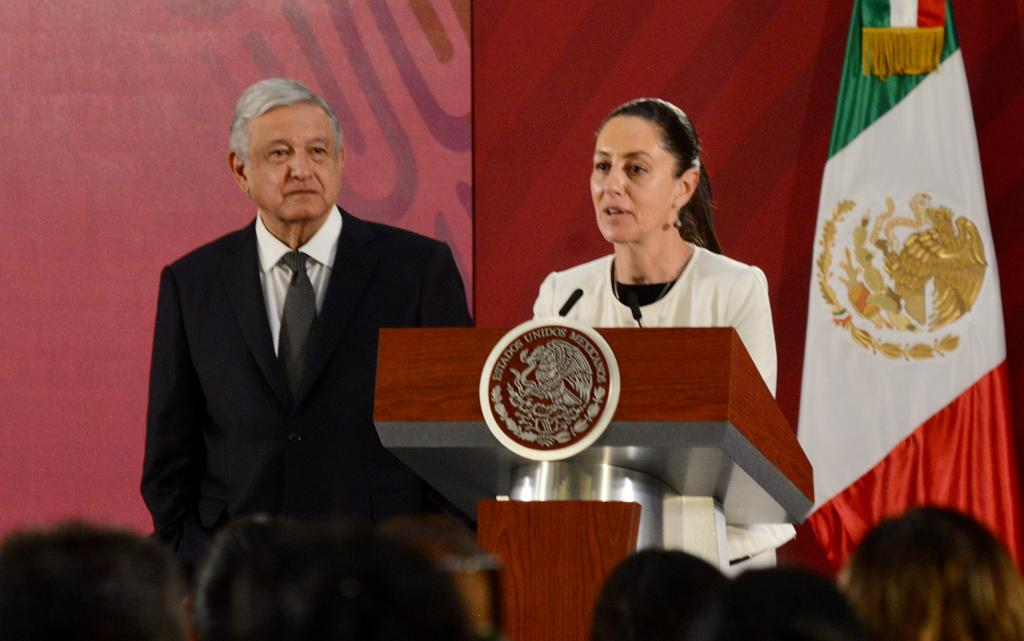
Sheinbaum with President Andrés Manuel López Obrador in late 2019

On 5 December 2018, Sheinbaum was inaugurated as Mexico City's head of government. She became the first elected female head of government and the first to come from a Jewish background.

Sheinbaum's administration was characterized by a strong relationship with the federal government and President López Obrador. However, she took distinct approaches to certain issues, such as managing the COVID-19 pandemic, where her scientific background shaped the city's response to the crisis.

Sheinbaum resigned on 16 June 2023 to participate in the internal selection for the Morena-led coalition, Juntos Hacemos Historia, ahead of the 2024 presidential election. Sheinbaum recommended Batres as substitute head of government, a choice later ratified by the Congress of Mexico City.

=== Crime and policing ===
Sheinbaum implemented a security strategy based on four pillars: addressing the root causes of violence through education and community programs; enhancing the quality and quantity of the police force; strengthening intelligence and investigative capabilities; and improving coordination among law enforcement agencies.

Her tenure saw several high-profile incidents, including the resignation and later indictment of her first security secretary, Jesús Orta, on federal corruption charges; the attempted assassination of her second security secretary, Omar García Harfuch; the escape of three inmates linked to the Sinaloa Cartel; and the widely publicized femicide of Ingrid Escamilla. Between 2018 and 2022, Mexico City's homicide rate declined from 17.9 to 8.6 per 100,000 people, although the city recorded 5,078 homicides in the first 52 months of her term—more than under her three immediate predecessors.

==== Gender violence ====
In 2019, Sheinbaum declared a gender violence alert in response to rising public concern. Her administration launched a citywide hotline and built over 700 kilometers of "safe corridors" to improve security for women in public spaces.

==== Gun control ====
Sheinbaum promoted a voluntary gun buyback program, allowing residents to anonymously exchange firearms for cash. By the end of her term, the program had collected more than 6,500 weapons, including over 1,300 long guns, and had cost about MX$40 million.

==== Organized crime ====
Her government targeted criminal groups including the Jalisco New Generation Cartel and La Unión Tepito, resulting in the arrest of multiple key figures. Analysts credited these operations to improved intelligence coordination led by Secretary of Security Omar García Harfuch.

Sheinbaum also oversaw the gradual deployment of the National Guard in Mexico City. While some experts viewed the measure as a deterrent, others questioned its tangible impact on violent crime, suggesting it served more as a symbolic presence.

=== Education ===
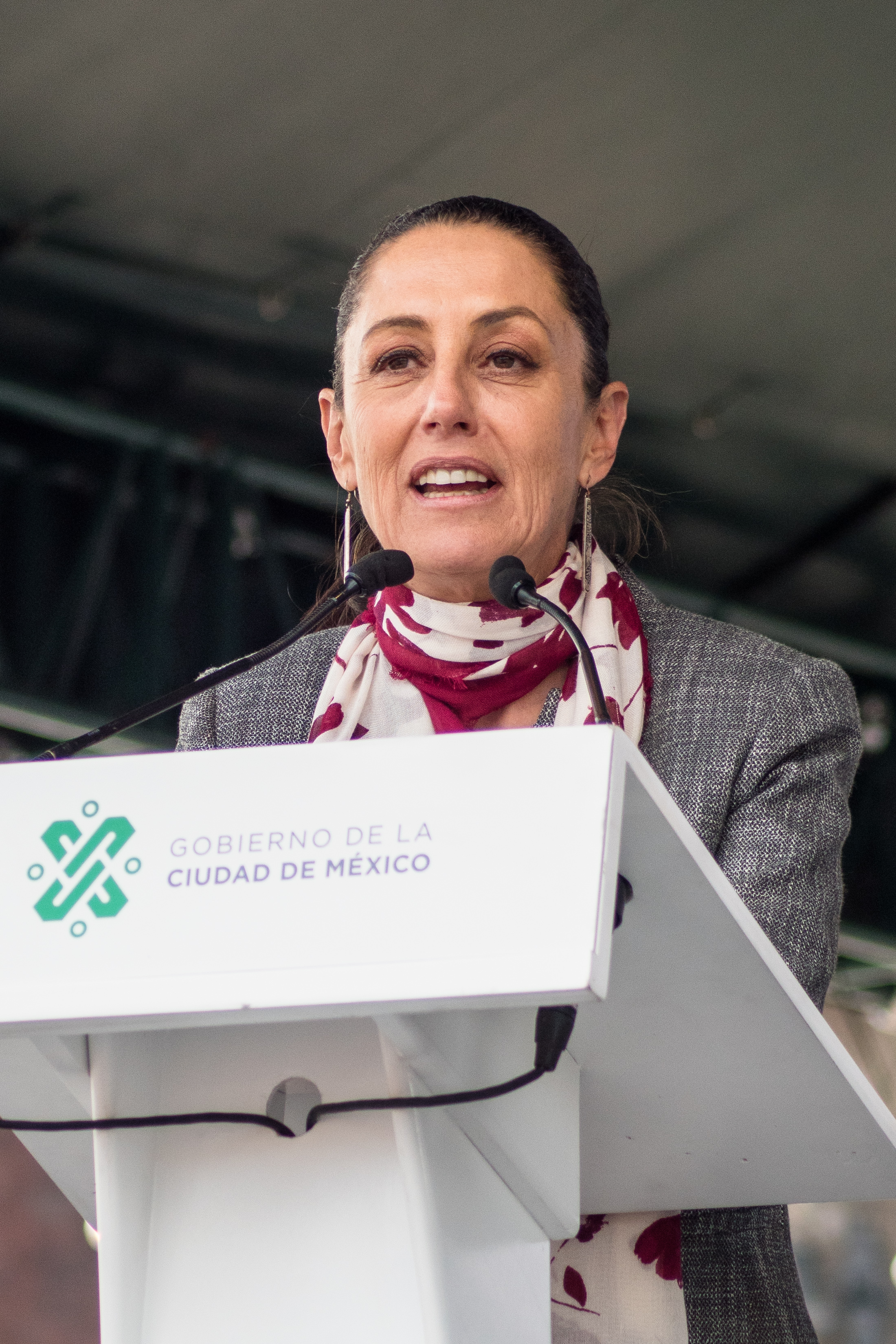
Claudia Sheinbaum in February 2020

As part of her administration's education policy, the Mi Beca para Empezar (lit. 'My Scholarship to Get Started') scholarship program was created for 1.2 million students from preschool to secondary education and, in 2022, was elevated to constitutional law in Mexico City. For higher education, the Rosario Castellanos Institute of Higher Studies and the University of Health were established.

Community centers called pilares (lit. 'pillars') were established in marginalized neighborhoods and towns. These spaces promoted arts, sports, education, and cultural activities and were recognized with an award from UNESCO in 2021.

=== Environment ===
In June 2019, Sheinbaum announced a new six-year environmental plan to reduce air pollution by 30%, plant 15 million trees, ban single-use plastics and promote recycling, build a new waste separation plant, provide water service to every home, construct 100 kilometers of trolleybus and metrobús-only corridors, and construct and install solar panels and water heaters.

=== Infrastructure ===
==== Public transportation ====
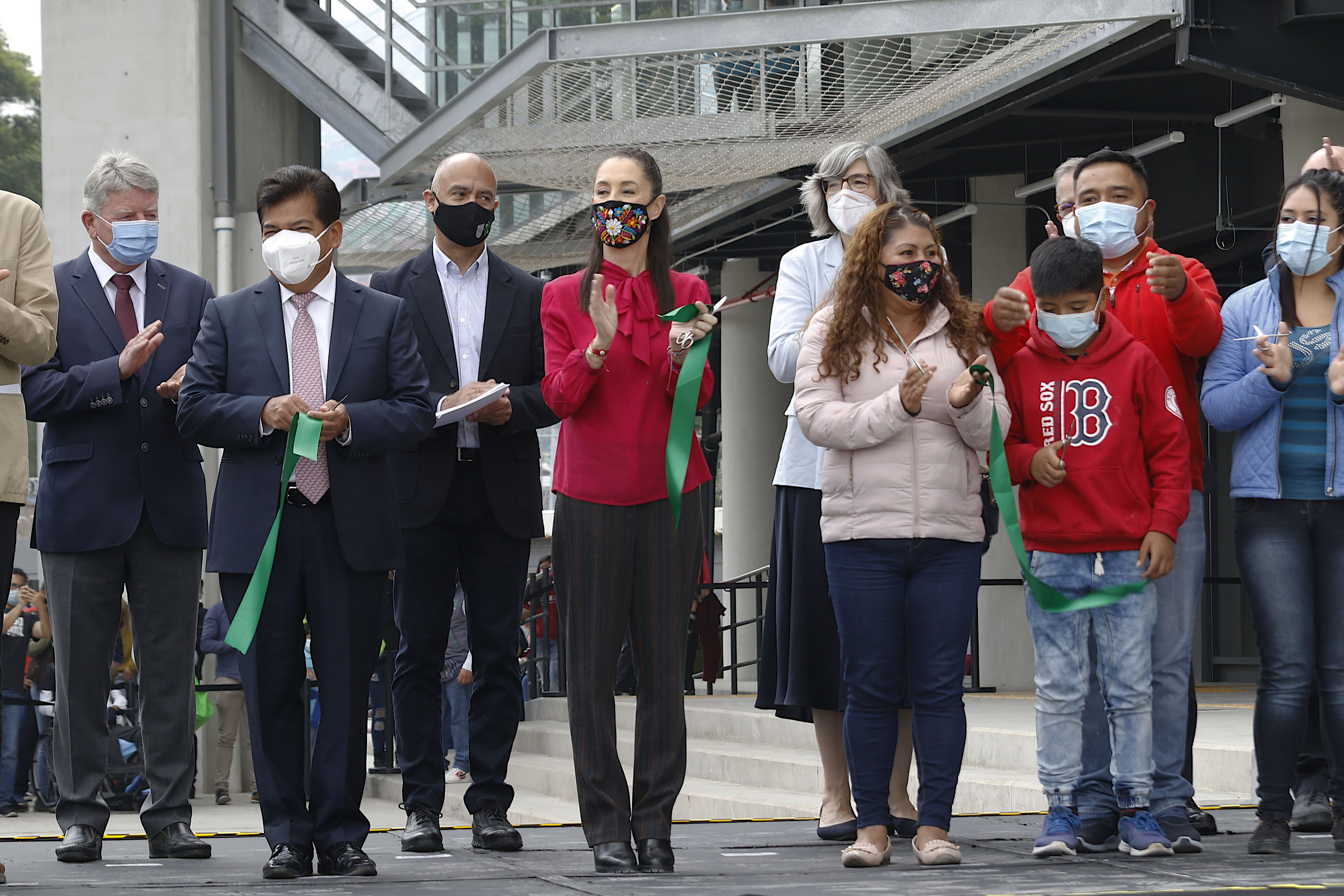
Sheinbaum at the inauguration of Line 1 of the Cablebús

Sheinbaum introduced the Cablebús cable car system, with Lines 1 and 2 opening in 2021, and began construction on Line 3 the same year. Her administration expanded the Metrobús network by 33 kilometers, electrified Line 3, and added low-emission buses to the city’s Red de Transporte de Pasajeros.

She continued the extension of Mexico City Metro Line 12 to Observatorio station and launched a MX$37 billion modernization of Metro Line 1 in 2022, including new trains, track replacements, and an upgraded control system. Her administration started Observatorio's redevelopment into a major terminal connecting Lines 1, 12, and the El Insurgente commuter rail line.

Her government introduced a unified mobility card for all public transit systems and expanded cycling infrastructure with 200 kilometers of bike lanes and 2,500 new Ecobici bikes.

==== Roads and highways ====
Sheinbaum announced the construction of vehicular bridges to improve road connectivity. Three notable projects included the Cuemanco Bridge, which connected Periférico Oriente with Canal Nacional; a new junction linking Circuito Interior with Eje 6; and Las Adelitas Bridge, which connected Circuito Interior with Gran Canal.

==== Criticism ====
Sheinbaum faced criticism for the management of the budget allocated to public transportation. Although she claimed that there were no cuts and that resources for the Metro were increased, budget data showed fluctuations in the allocation of funds for different transportation systems between 2018 and 2023.

Other infrastructure projects, such as the renovation of Mexico City Metro Line 1, the extension of Mexico City Metro Line 12 to Observatorio, the construction of the Interurban Train Mexico City–Toluca, and Line 3 of the Cablebús, remained incomplete at the time of her resignation to seek her party's presidential nomination.

=== Social issues ===
In 2019, Sheinbaum implemented a gender-neutral uniform policy for students in state-run schools, allowing them to wear uniforms of their choice regardless of gender. In 2021, Sheinbaum removed a statue of Christopher Columbus from Mexico City's Paseo de la Reforma as part of what she called a "decolonization" exercise.

=== Crisis management ===
==== COVID-19 pandemic response ====
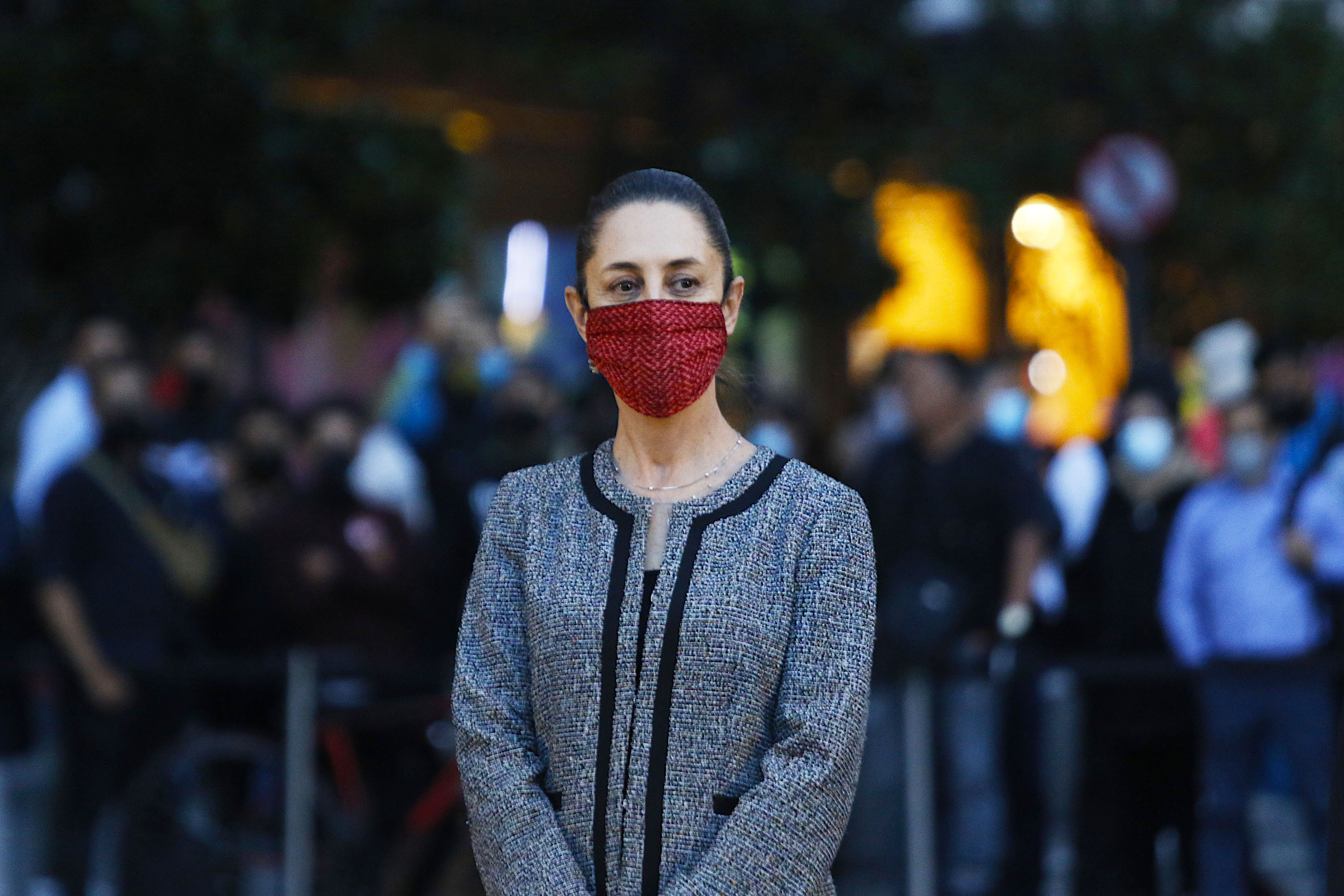
Sheinbaum during the COVID-19 pandemic on 12 August 2021

Shortly after the first COVID-19 case in Mexico City was confirmed on 28 February 2020, Sheinbaum addressed the city, emphasizing that although the risk was low, the population needed to stay informed through official sources. On 19 March, Sheinbaum urged residents to stay at home to prevent the spread of infection. She also advised those with symptoms to text a hotline for guidance instead of going to hospitals to avoid overwhelming the healthcare system. On 22 March, Sheinbaum announced the closure of commercial establishments, cultural venues, sports facilities, and religious spaces.

López Obrador and Sheinbaum had differing views on using face masks: Sheinbaum encouraged Mexico City residents to wear face masks, while López Obrador frequently did not wear them in public. During her administration, over 200,000 kits containing ivermectin were distributed to patients diagnosed with COVID-19 without their knowledge.

Sheinbaum was nominated by the City Mayors Foundation for the World Mayor Prize in 2021 in North America for her handling of the COVID-19 pandemic in Mexico.

==== Collapse of Line 12 of the Mexico City Metro ====
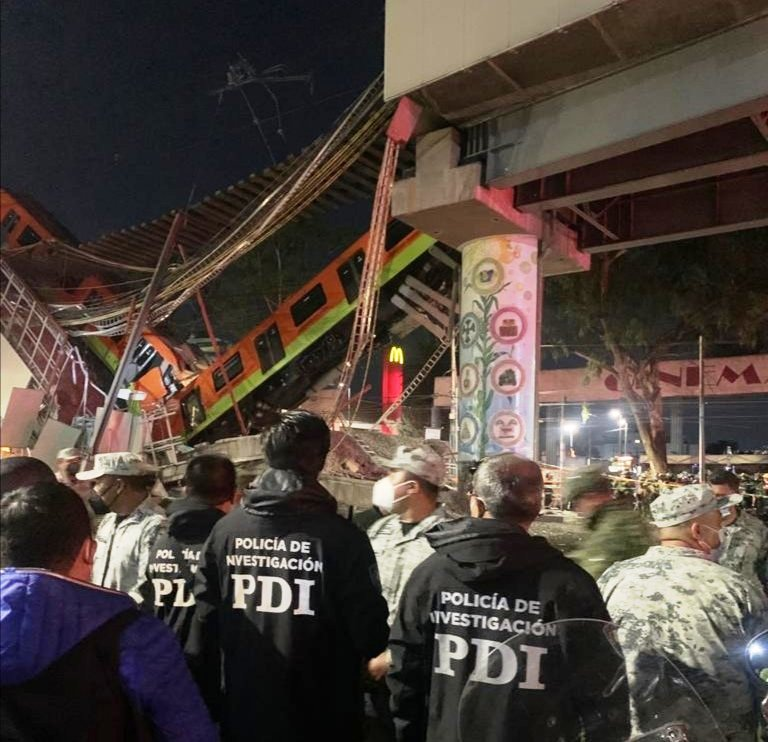
Investigators at the collapse site

At around 10:22 p.m. on 3 May 2021, several girders, part of the tracks, and two wagons of Line 12 of the Mexico City Metro collapsed between the Olivos and Tezonco stations. The casualties were 26 dead, 80 injured, and five missing. Line 12 of the Metro had been inaugurated on 30 October 2012 by the head of government of Mexico City, Marcelo Ebrard, and the president of Mexico, Felipe Calderón.

Engineering flaws that had existed prior to the line's inauguration became worse over time, necessitating maintenance repairs over the next three years, including an unprecedented closure of the line to re-shape some sections of tracks and to replace the rails; most of these improvements were carried out during the term of Miguel Ángel Mancera as Head of Government. On 4 May 2021, Ebrard, then serving as Secretary of Foreign Affairs, said that the work was definitively delivered in July 2013, after reviews carried out for seven months, and expressed his willingness to respond and collaborate in the event of any request from the authorities.

Det Norske Veritas (DNV), a Norwegian company in charge of investigating the causes of the collapse of Metro Line 12, detected that one of the beams that collapsed already had structural failures since before the earthquake of 19 September 2017, a factor that had caused problems in the elevated section of the line that collapsed. On 28 June 2021, Sheinbaum dismissed the general director of the Mexico City Metro, Florencia Serranía Soto.

Some political observers suggested that the political fallout from the disaster could harm Sheinbaum's candidacy in the 2024 presidential election. Alejo Sánchez Cano, editor of the Mexico City daily newspaper El Financiero, opined that Sheinbaum's responsibility was unavoidable, stating that after having been in office for two and a half years, she failed to maintain the Metro system.

== 2024 presidential campaign ==
=== Nomination ===
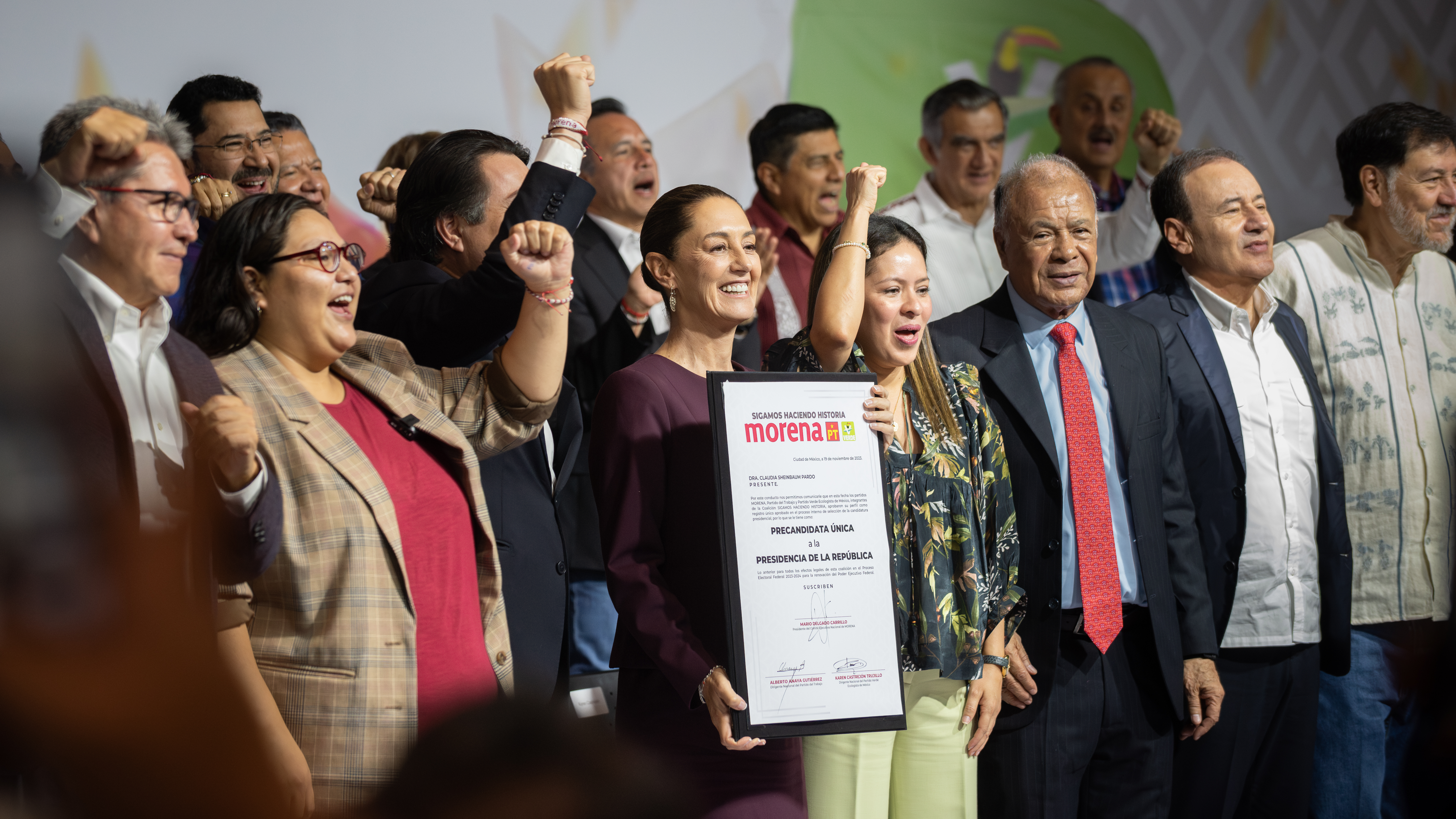
Sheinbaum receiving a certificate confirming her as the presidential nominee for Sigamos Haciendo Historia on 19 November 2023

On 12 June 2023, Sheinbaum announced that she would resign as head of government of Mexico City on 16 June to contend in the internal selection process to select a de facto presidential candidate for Juntos Hacemos Historia, a coalition encompassing Morena, the Labor Party, and the Ecologist Green Party of Mexico. Speculation regarding her nationality emerged after former president Vicente Fox referred to her as a "Bulgarian Jew". In response, Sheinbaum released her birth certificate, showing she was born in Mexico City.

The coalition's internal process consisted of five polls from 28 August to 4 September. On 6 September, Sheinbaum was declared the winner, securing 39.38% of the vote and defeating her closest opponent, former foreign secretary Marcelo Ebrard, by around 13 points. On 19 November 2023, Sheinbaum was registered as the presidential nominee of Sigamos Haciendo Historia, the successor coalition to Juntos Hacemos Historia. Sheinbaum formally registered her candidacy at the National Electoral Institute (INE) on 18 February 2024.

=== General election ===
Sheinbaum at the start of her campaign in the Zócalo of Mexico City on 1 March 2024

On 1 March 2024, Sheinbaum launched her campaign at the Zócalo, outlining her proposals and emphasizing her commitment to continuing President López Obrador's Fourth Transformation policies. She pledged to pass "Plan C", a package of eighteen constitutional amendments proposed by López Obrador earlier that year, which include increasing the minimum wage above inflation, elevating social programs to constitutional law, and electing judiciary members by popular vote. She also proposed replicating her Mexico City security strategy nationwide, introducing a constitutional amendment to prevent reelection for any popularly elected position, and implementing new social programs for students from preschool to secondary education and women aged 60 to 64.

During debates and the campaign, Sheinbaum was accused by Xóchitl Gálvez, the candidate from the opposition coalition Fuerza y Corazón por México, of being responsible for the collapse of the Colegio Rébsamen during the 2017 Puebla earthquake, the Mexico City Metro overpass collapse, and the excess deaths during the COVID-19 pandemic in Mexico City.

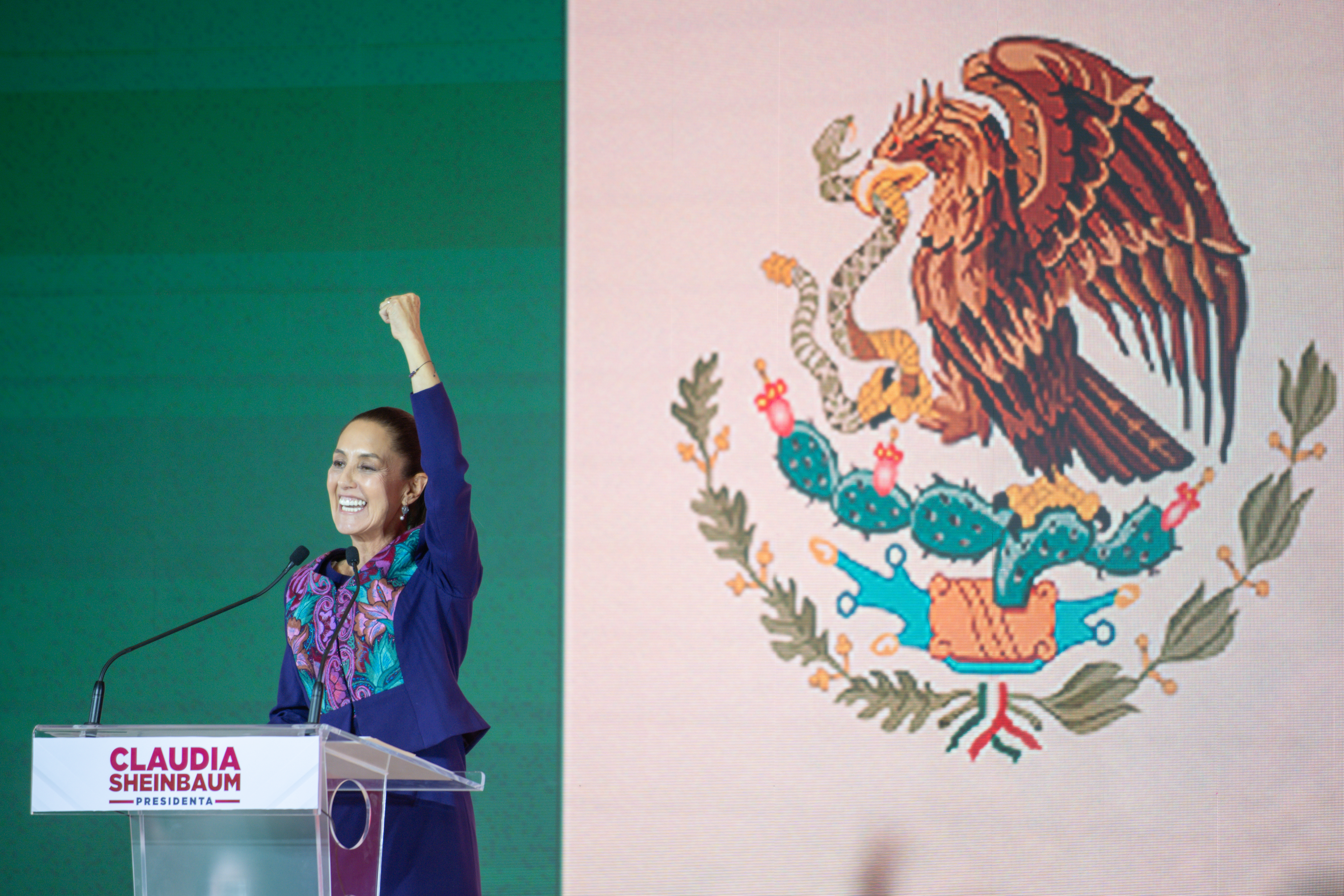
Sheinbaum during her victory speech on 2 June 2024

Polls consistently indicated that Sheinbaum held a substantial lead over her main opponent, Xóchitl Gálvez. During the three presidential debates, many commentators praised her calm demeanor during provocations from Gálvez.

The election took place on 2 June 2024, with Sheinbaum being projected the winner by the INE's quick count at 11:50 CST, making her the virtual president-elect. On 6 June, district tallies confirmed that Sheinbaum won a landslide victory. She received the highest number of votes ever recorded for a candidate in Mexican history, carried 31 out of 32 states, and achieved 59.76% of the vote, the highest vote percentage since free and fair elections began in Mexico.

=== Presidential transition ===
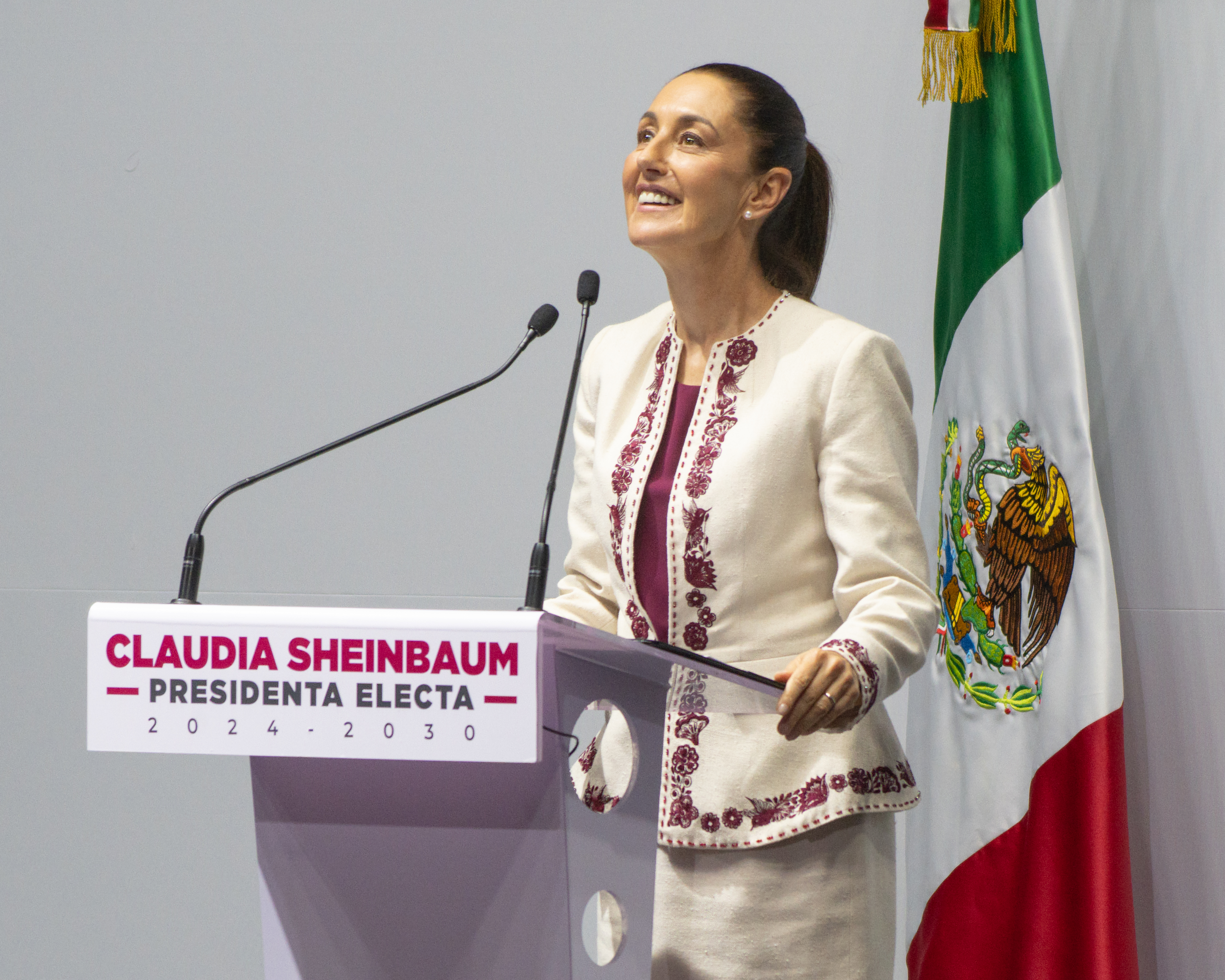
Sheinbaum during an event to celebrate her declaration as president-elect of Mexico on 15 August 2024

Following her victory, Sheinbaum met with President López Obrador to outline the presidential transition and her legislative agenda for the early months of her administration. She detailed that her priorities included new social programs for primary school students and women aged 60 to 64, modifications to the pension system for government employees, and a ban on reelection for any popularly elected position. While Sheinbaum voiced support for López Obrador's judicial reform, she agreed to open nine discussion forums to address its most controversial aspects.

Sheinbaum rolled out her cabinet appointments in phases, beginning with the first announcements on 20 June. In early August, she met with governors and governors-elect to outline key projects for her 2025 budget. Sheinbaum also pledged to continue López Obrador's morning press conferences, known as mañaneras, at 7:00 AM CST.

After the LXVI Legislature was sworn in on 1 September, several of her campaign promises that stemmed from López Obrador's "Plan C" were either fully or partially passed by Congress. The judicial reform and the transfer of the National Guard to the Secretariat of National Defense were passed by both chambers, while the increases in the minimum wage above inflation and the elevation of certain social programs to constitutional status were approved solely by the Chamber of Deputies.

== Presidency (2024–present) ==
=== Inauguration ===
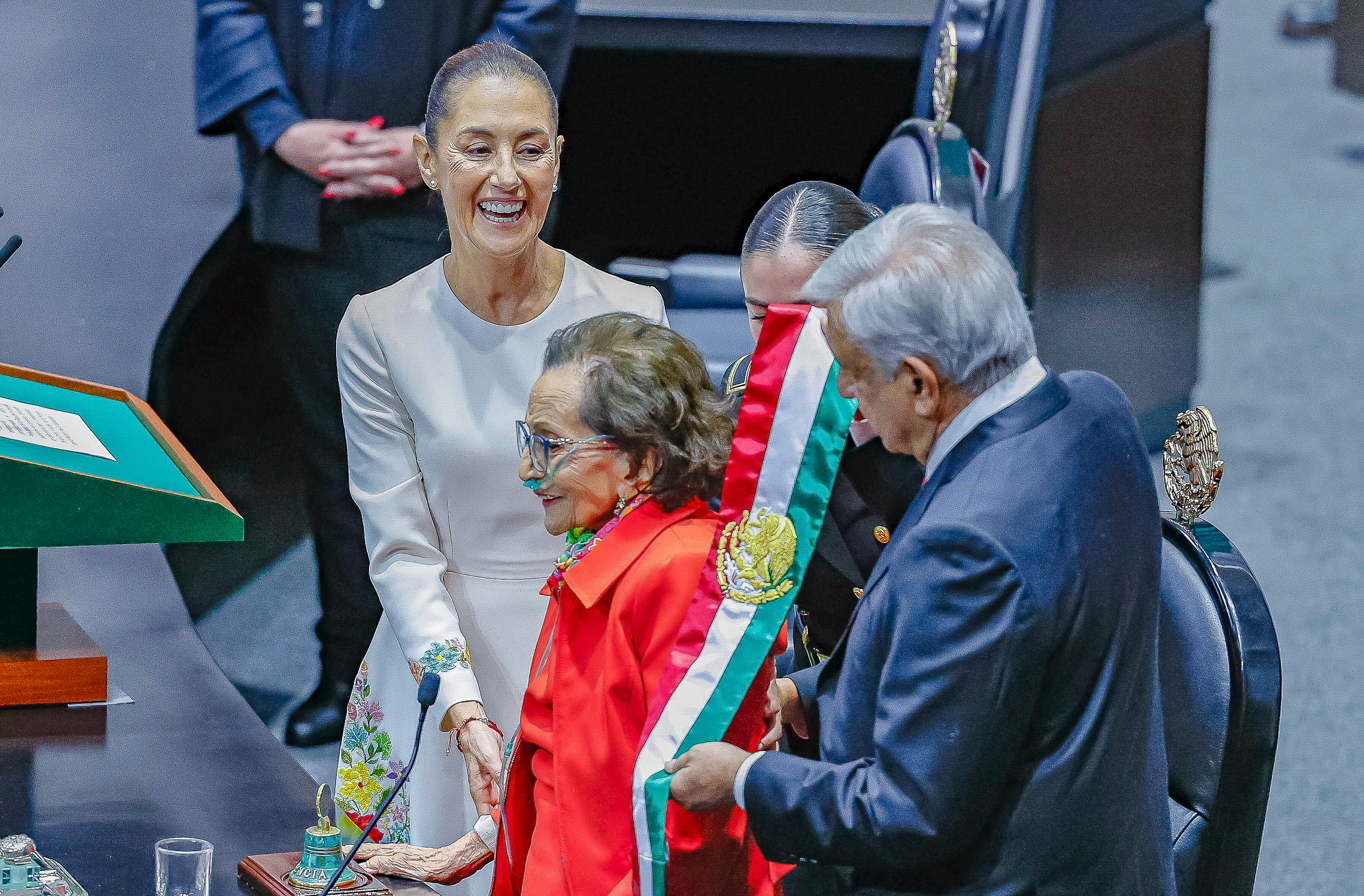
Andrés Manuel López Obrador hands the presidential sash to Ifigenia Martínez, who then presents it to Sheinbaum during her inauguration on 1 October 2024.

Sheinbaum was sworn in as president on 1 October 2024, becoming the first woman, as well as the first person with Jewish heritage, (Note: Carlos Salinas de Gortari, president of Mexico from 1988 to 1994, is of partial colonial-era Sephardic Jewish descent.) to hold the office. The presidential sash was handed to her by Ifigenia Martínez, the president of the Congress of the Union and a prominent figure for the Mexican left. In her address to Congress, Sheinbaum thanked her predecessor, highlighted her historic election as the first woman to the presidency, pledged responsible fiscal policies, and reassured foreign investors.

Her inauguration was attended by 105 representatives from various countries, including 16 heads of state and 23 delegates from international organizations. Notable attendees included Brazilian president Lula da Silva, Chilean president Gabriel Boric, Colombian president Gustavo Petro, former German president Christian Wulff, and US first lady Jill Biden. King Felipe VI of Spain was controversially not invited, with Sheinbaum citing his failure to respond to López Obrador's 2019 letter requesting an apology for the abuses committed during the Spanish conquest. This prompted a boycott by the Spanish government.

=== Cabinet ===
Sheinbaum's initial cabinet was described as a mix of political allies and appointees with academic or specialized professional backgrounds. Several figures from López Obrador's administration remained in office, including Rogelio Ramírez de la O as Secretary of Finance and Ariadna Montiel Reyes as Secretary of Welfare. Rosa Icela Rodríguez was named Secretary of the Interior, having previously served as López Obrador's Secretary of Security and Civilian Protection and as Sheinbaum's government secretary in Mexico City. Mario Delgado, who served as Morena's president from 2020 to 2024 and as general coordinator of Sheinbaum's presidential campaign, was appointed Secretary of Education. From her Mexico City government, she appointed García Harfuch as Secretary of Security and Civilian Protection and Luz Elena González as Secretary of Energy. She also appointed her former presidential rival, Ebrard, as Secretary of Economy, a move seen by analysts and business groups as conciliatory toward Morena’s moderate, pro-business wing and as strengthening Mexico’s position ahead of the upcoming United States–Mexico–Canada Agreement (USMCA) review.

Sheinbaum expanded the federal cabinet by creating three new secretariats: the Secretariat of Women (replacing the National Institute for Women), the Secretariat of Science, Humanities, Technology and Innovation (replacing CONAHCYT), and the Digital Transformation and Telecommunications Agency. She also replaced the Secretariat of the Civil Service with the Secretariat of Anticorruption and Good Governance.

=== Domestic policy ===
Sheinbaum continued her predecessor's practice of holding "mañaneras", regular press briefings in the morning.

On 2 October 2024, the anniversary of the Tlatelolco massacre, Sheinbaum issued a decree acknowledging the State's responsibility for the killings. The decree included a public apology, which was delivered by Secretary of the Interior Rosa Icela Rodríguez.

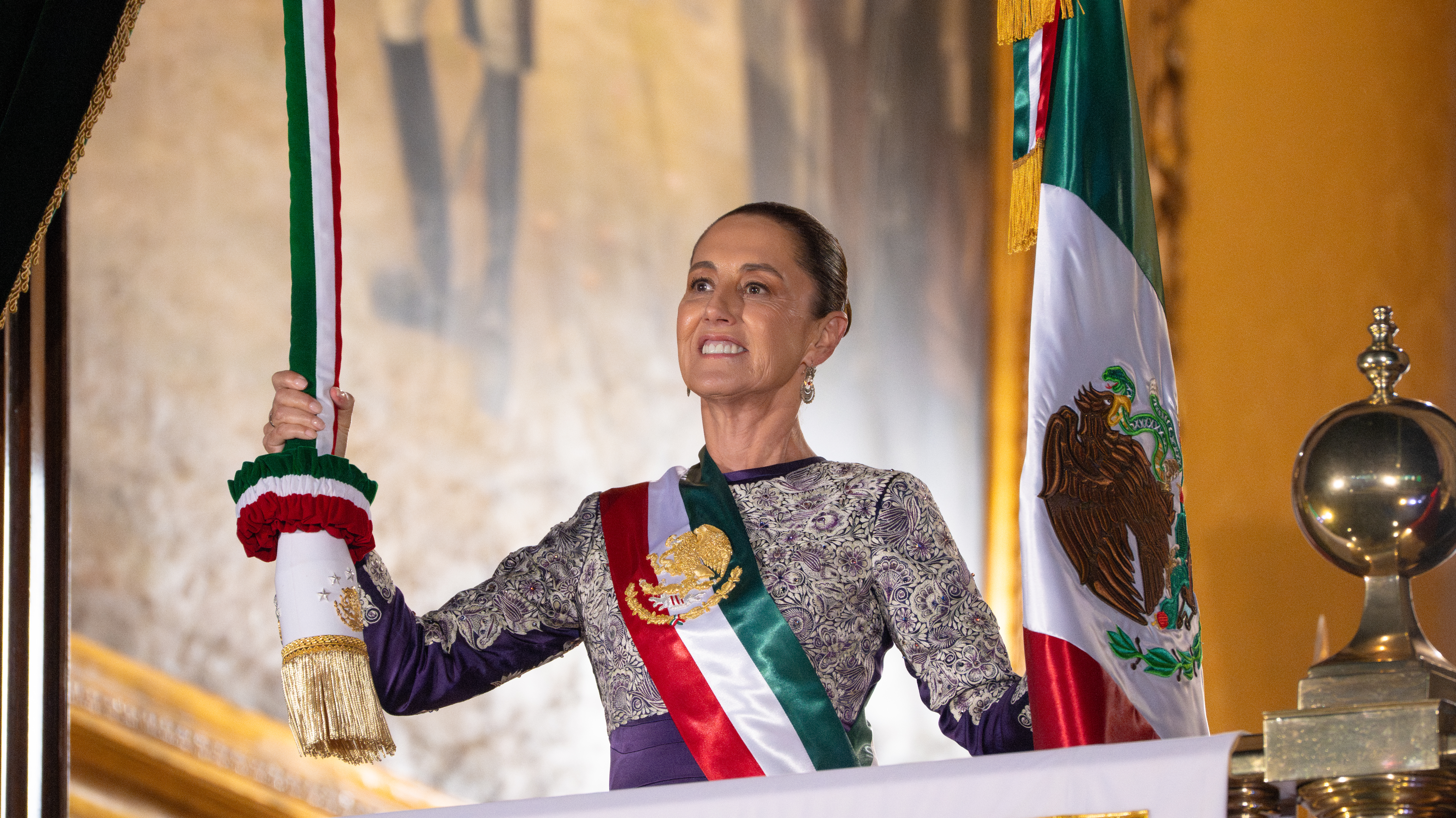
Sheinbaum at the 2025 Cry of Dolores at the National Palace, Mexico City, marking the first time the ceremony was led by a woman.

Faced with what many described as a looming constitutional crisis, Sheinbaum rejected a Supreme Court proposal to strike down parts of the judicial reform bill passed by López Obrador, asserting that the judiciary has no authority to review constitutional amendments and signaling she would not comply with any adverse ruling. She subsequently published a bill enshrining constitutional supremacy, which limited legal challenges to constitutional amendments strictly to procedural grounds.

==== Crime and the drug war ====
Sheinbaum’s security strategy is built around four core pillars: addressing the root causes of violence, strengthening the National Guard, enhancing intelligence and investigative capabilities, and maintaining constant communication between the security cabinet and the country's federative entities. She appointed Omar García Harfuch to head the Secretariat of Security and Civilian Protection (SSCP), a role he previously held in her Mexico City cabinet. Her administration adopted a more hard-handed approach toward organized crime, with the SSCP going after organized crime's logistical networks and "violence generators", marking a departure from López Obrador's "hugs, not bullets" strategy. The SSPC's powers were expanded through legislation that facilitated closer collaboration with the Attorney General's Office, improved intelligence-gathering across all levels of government, and allowed the SSPC to request information from any agency for criminal investigations. Her administration expanded the catalogue of crimes subject to mandatory pre-trial detention, including extortion, contraband, the use of false tax receipts, and activities related to the production, trafficking, and distribution of synthetic drugs such as fentanyl and its derivatives. She also continued the militarization of the National Guard, endorsing its continued integration into the Secretariat of National Defense, and launched a nationwide gun buyback program called Sí al Desarme, Sí a la Paz (lit. 'Yes to Disarmament, Yes to Peace') to reduce the number of weapons in circulation.

During the first months of Sheinbaum's administration, the homicide rate decreased by approximately 25%, with daily homicides falling from 86.9 at the start of her term to 64.5 as of May 2025. Other high-impact crimes, including kidnappings and bank robberies, also decreased during this period, although incidents of extortion and the number of disappearances have continued to rise, with about 8,000 new cases of disappeared persons reported during the same period. The administration reported significant increases in drug seizures; by June 2025, authorities had confiscated approximately 178 tonnes of narcotics, including 3 million fentanyl pills, from 1,150 clandestine laboratories. Efforts to combat fuel theft, known as huachicol, were also expanded, with multiple seizures conducted at sea and at illegal refineries across the country.

Despite reported gains, Sheinbaum's presidency has been marked by ongoing cartel violence. Across the country, political assassinations have continued at a high pace, leaving local officials particularly vulnerable. Clashes between rival factions of the Sinaloa Cartel contributed to a more than 400% increase in homicides in Sinaloa during the first half of 2025, prompting federal deployment of additional forces and arrests of mid-to-high ranking members of both factions. In March 2025, authorities discovered a training camp in Teuchitlán, Jalisco, allegedly used by the Jalisco New Generation Cartel (CJNG) as a forced recruitment center, which resulted in the arrest of a dozen people, including the municipality's mayor and alleged CJNG recruiter "El Comandante Lastra". Violence in Michoacán also intensified, defined by a turf war between the CJNG and Cárteles Unidos that has led to rampant extortion of the state's avocado and lime industries and a wave of assassinations targeting public and community leaders, including the murder of Uruapan's mayor, Carlos Manzo.

==== Energy ====
Sheinbaum continued elements of the energy nationalism advanced by Andrés Manuel López Obrador, aiming to strengthen the state-owned Federal Electricity Commission (CFE) and Petróleos Mexicanos (Pemex). On 30 October 2024, she published a constitutional amendment that reclassified both entities as public institutions and established a mandate for the CFE to retain 54% of the national electricity generation market, with the remaining 46% allocated to private producers. Her administration also revised oil production targets, setting a goal of 1.8 million barrels per day—lower than the 2 million barrels pursued under López Obrador.

==== Infrastructure and passenger rail ====
During her presidency, Sheinbaum made the expansion of Mexico’s passenger rail network a central element of her infrastructure agenda, promoting state-led development of intercity rail and enacting a constitutional amendment restoring federal authority over passenger rail operations. Her administration announced plans to construct approximately 3,000 kilometres of new lines, including the Mexico–Pachuca, Mexico–Nuevo Laredo, and Mexico–Nogales lines. She also oversaw the inauguration of the final sections of the Tren Maya in 2024, and in February 2026 she inaugurated the Santa Fe–Observatorio section of Tren El Insurgente, completing the Mexico City–Toluca interurban rail link begun in 2014.

In 2024, Sheinbaum announced a MX$33 billion investment to modernize six ports across Mexico: Ensenada, Baja California; Manzanillo, Colima; Lázaro Cárdenas, Michoacán; Acapulco, Guerrero; Veracruz, Veracruz; and Progreso, Yucatán.

Sheinbaum has continued her predecessor's practice of employing SEDENA's Military Engineers Corps. to build government infrastructure projects.

==== Institutional reform ====
Sheinbaum continued the centralization of executive authority by dissolving seven autonomous agencies in late 2024: the Federal Telecommunications Institute (IFT), the Federal Economic Competition Commission (COFECE), the National Institute for Transparency (INAI), the Energy Regulatory Commission (CRE), the National Hydrocarbons Commission (CNH), the National Council for the Evaluation of Social Development Policy (CONEVAL), and the National Institute for the Evaluation of Education (MejorEdu). Their functions were transferred to various cabinet ministries in what the administration described as an effort to streamline government operations and reduce public spending, though critics argued that the measure undermined transparency, regulatory independence, and checks on executive power.

On 1 April 2025, Sheinbaum published a constitutional reform to prohibit immediate reelection and bar close relatives of incumbents from running for the same office; although initially set for 2027, its implementation was postponed to 2030 following negotiations within the ruling coalition in the Senate. In February 2026, Sheinbaum proposed a broader electoral reform package to reduce the size of the Senate, modify proportional representation, cut party financing and electoral costs, eliminate the preliminary results program (PREP), and regulate the use of artificial intelligence in campaigns; however, the proposal failed to obtain a two-thirds majority after coalition allies—the Ecologist Green Party of Mexico (PVEM) and the Labor Party (PT)—withheld support amid concerns that the changes would weaken smaller parties, reduce their political influence, and concentrate power in the ruling party.

==== Protests and social unrest ====
The Coordinadora Nacional de Trabajadores de la Educación (CNTE) organized repeated strikes, work stoppages, and protest encampments, pressuring the government to fulfill campaign promises regarding the repeal of the 2007 ISSSTE Law and the improvement of pension benefits. In the fall of 2025, widespread farmer strikes and highway blockades erupted across multiple states, with agricultural workers and truckers demanding higher guaranteed crop prices, improved highway security, and the rejection of a water reform bill promoted by the government; these actions frequently paralyzed transport routes leading into Mexico City. In November 2025, a series of demonstrations opposing the administration—sparked in part by the assassination of Uruapan mayor Carlos Manzo—took place in several cities; Sheinbaum characterized the protests as politically motivated and lacking organic support.

==== Welfare ====
Sheinbaum expanded federal social programs including the introduction of the Women's Wellbeing Pension (Pensión Mujeres Bienestar), which provides bimonthly financial assistance to senior women aged 60 to 64, and the launch of the House to House Health (Salud Casa a Casa) program, which delivers home-based medical care to elderly people and individuals with disabilities. She also renamed the Benito Juárez Scholarship (Beca Benito Juárez) to the Rita Cetina Gutiérrez Universal Scholarship (Beca Universal Rita Cetina Gutiérrez), expanding it to provide bimonthly financial aid to all families with children enrolled in the public basic educational system. On 2 December 2024, Sheinbaum elevated several social programs to constitutional law. Her administration has continued to prioritize social spending in budget allocations, with social program spending equivalent to approximately 3% of gross domestic product, according to the 2026 budget.

Sheinbaum proposed a constitutional reform providing that annual minimum wage increases may not be set below the inflation rate; while the reform had not yet been enacted, wage policy has been implemented in line with this framework, with the daily minimum wage set at MX$278.80 and later increased to MX$315.04 for 2026, consistent with a stated objective of reaching the equivalent of 2.5 food baskets by 2030. The administration also formalized the Ley Silla, granting service-sector workers the right to seating and rest periods, enacted a reform regulating digital platform work that extends IMSS social security coverage and mandatory occupational accident insurance to active platform workers, and reached a tripartite agreement to gradually reduce the legal workweek from 48 to 40 hours beginning in 2027.

=== Foreign policy ===
Sheinbaum's presidency has been dominated by relations with the United States under the second administration of Donald Trump. After Trump threatened tariffs of 25% on Mexican goods in early 2025, she negotiated repeated pauses and secured exemptions for goods that complied with the United States–Mexico–Canada Agreement. Her government condemned the United States designation of Mexican drug cartels as foreign terrorist organizations, and she rejected Trump's offer to send United States troops into Mexico, saying that "sovereignty is not for sale". At the same time, Mexico expanded cooperation, transferring dozens of imprisoned cartel figures to the United States and sharing intelligence in operations against cartel leaders, including the killing of CJNG leader "El Mencho" in 2026. Sheinbaum also opposed United States military action abroad as contrary to international law, objecting to a campaign of strikes on suspected drug-trafficking boats in international waters and condemned a United States military operation in Venezuela in January 2026.

Sheinbaum has sought to deepen Mexico's engagement with Latin America, calling for greater regional economic integration at the 2025 CELAC summit and aligning with other left-led governments. She has maintained close ties with Cuba through oil shipments and later humanitarian aid. Mexico's relations with Ecuador remained severed following the 2024 raid on its embassy in Quito, and broke down with Peru in November 2025 after Mexico granted asylum to a former Peruvian prime minister, prompting Peru's Congress to declare Sheinbaum persona non grata.

Sheinbaum has supported a two-state settlement of the Israeli–Palestinian conflict and called for recognition of a Palestinian state alongside Israel. She condemned the Gaza war and, in September 2025, described Israel's actions there as a "genocide".

=== Approval rating ===
Throughout her first year in office, Sheinbaum maintained high public approval ratings, consistently polling above 70%. Between January and April 2025, her approval rose to approximately 80%, a surge that several analysts described as a rally 'round the flag effect following her initial handling of tariffs imposed by U.S. President Donald Trump. By December 2025, surveys by Enkoll and El Financiero indicated that her approval had moderated to approximately 70%, coinciding with heightened public concern over violence in states such as Michoacán and broader economic uncertainty. Despite this decline, her disapproval rating remained comparatively low, at about 24%, and her approval continued to exceed that of her predecessor, López Obrador, at the same point in his presidency.

Demographically, Sheinbaum’s strongest support has been recorded among older adults, with approval ranging from 72% to as high as 86% in late 2025. This demographic is frequently cited as the primary beneficiary of the administration's expanded social programs. Support has been lower among younger voters, with approval among those aged 18–24 polling between 57% and 66%.

== Political views ==
=== Social issues ===
Sheinbaum is a self-described feminist, aligning her beliefs and actions with the principles of gender equality and women's rights. She advocates for the legalization of abortion, aligning her stance with broader movements aimed at promoting reproductive rights and autonomy for women. During her leadership in Mexico City, Sheinbaum implemented a gender-neutral policy regarding school uniforms in state-run schools and championed LGBT rights. In 2022, she became the first head of government of Mexico City to attend the city's gay pride march.

=== Economy ===
Sheinbaum has criticized the neoliberal economic policies of past presidents of Mexico, arguing that they have contributed to inequality in the country. She has promised to expand welfare under her presidency and intends to continue programs started by López Obrador, such as universal pension.

=== Environment ===
Sheinbaum has a background in environmental policy, having served as Minister of the Environment for Mexico City and worked on the Intergovernmental Panel on Climate Change (IPCC), which would go on to win the panel a Nobel Peace Prize. In her tenure as Minister of the Environment, she saw a marked reduction in air pollution and created community ecological reserves. She has both spoken in favor of clean energy and support of oil, praising PEMEX (the nation's state-owned oil company).

== Personal life ==
In 1986, Sheinbaum met Carlos Ímaz Gispert, who later became a prominent political figure in the PRD during his tenure at Stanford University. They married in 1987 and divorced in 2016. They have a daughter who was born in 1988.

In 2016, she began dating Jesús María Tarriba Unger, a financial risk analyst for the Bank of Mexico, whom she had known as a university student. In November 2023, Sheinbaum announced her marriage to Tarriba via social media. The two married in a small civil ceremony.

== Awards and honours ==
=== Honours ===
==== National ====
- Mexico:
  - Grand Master and Collar of the Order of the Aztec Eagle (1 October 2024)

=== Media ===
- BBC's 100 Women (2018)
- Time 100 Climate (2024)
- Forbes 2024 list of World's 100 most powerful women, position 4
- Time World's 100 most influential people (2025)
- Forbes 2025 list of World's 100 most powerful women, position 5

=== Other awards ===
- Jesus Silva Herzog Award (1995). Awarded by the National Autonomous University of Mexico's Institute for Economic Research for her outstanding contributions in the field of economics.
- UNAM Prize for Young Academics (2001). Awarded for her contributions to academia while working at the National Autonomous University of Mexico.
- The Sustainability Medal (2024). Awarded by the Nobel Sustainability Trust for her global leadership in sustainability and climate change policies.
- Sheinbaum was part of the Intergovernmental Panel on Climate Change (IPCC) team that received the Nobel Peace Prize in 2007 for their work on advancing the understanding of man-made climate change.

== Selected bibliography ==
Sheinbaum is the author of over 100 articles and two books on energy, the environment, and sustainable development. A selection follows:

- Consumo de energía y emisiones de CO_{2} del autotransporte en México y Escenarios de Mitigación, Ávila-Solís JC, Sheinbaum-Pardo C. 2016.
- Decomposition analysis from demand services to material production: The case of CO_{2} emissions from steel produced for automobiles in Mexico, Applied Energy, 174: 245–255, Sheinbaum-Pardo C. 2016.
- The impact of energy efficiency standards on residential electricity consumption in Mexico, Energy for Sustainable Development, 32:50–61 Martínez-Montejo S.A., Sheinbaum-Pardo C. 2016.
- Science and Technology in the framework of the Sustainable Development Goals, World Journal of Science, Technology and Sustainable Development, 14:2 – 17. Imaz M. Sheinbaum C. 2017.
- Assessing the Impacts of Final Demand on CO_{2}-eq Emissions in the Mexican Economy: An Input-Output Analysis, Energy and Power Engineering, 9:40–54, Chatellier D, Sheinbaum C. 2017.
- Electricity sector reforms in four Latin-American countries and their impact on carbon dioxide emissions and renewable energy, Ruíz- Mendoza BJ, Sheinbaum-Pardo C. Energy Policy, 2010
- Energy consumption and related CO_{2} emissions in five Latin American countries: Changes from 1990 to 2006 and perspectives, Sheinbaum C, Ruíz BJ, Ozawa L. Energy, 2010.
- Mitigating Carbon Emissions while Advancing National Development Priorities: The Case of Mexico, C Sheinbaum, O Masera, Climatic Change, Springer, 2000.
- Energy use and CO_{2} emissions for Mexico's cement industry, C Sheinbaum, L Ozawa, Energy, Elsevier, 1998.
- Energy use and CO_{2} emissions in Mexico's iron and steel industry, L Ozawa, C Sheinbaum, N Martin, E Worrell, L Price, Energy, Elsevier, 2002.
- New trends in industrial energy efficiency in the Mexico iron and steel industry, L Ozawa, N Martin, E Worrell, L Price, C Sheinbaum, OSTI, 1999.
- Mexican Electric end-use Efficiency: Experiences to Date, R Friedmann, C Sheinbaum, Annual Review of Energy and the Environment, 1998.
- Incorporating Sustainable Development Concerns into Climate Change Mitigation: A Case Study, OR Masera, C Sheinbaum, Climate Change and Development, UDLAP, 2000.

== See also ==
- List of current heads of state and government
- List of heads of the executive by approval rating

== Notes ==
Political offices
Preceded by Alejandro Encinas Rodríguez	Secretary of the Environment of Mexico City; 2000–2006	Succeeded by Eduardo Vega López
Preceded by Héctor Hugo Hernández Rodríguez	Mayor of Tlalpan; 2015–2017	Succeeded by Fernando Hernández Palacios
Preceded by José Ramón Amieva	Head of Government of Mexico City; 2018–2023	Succeeded by Martí Batres
Preceded by Andrés Manuel López Obrador	President of Mexico; 2024–present	Incumbent
Party political offices
Preceded by Andrés Manuel López Obrador	Morena nominee for President of Mexico; 2024	Most recent
