= Eduardo Blasco de Imaz =

Spanish swimmer (born 1994)

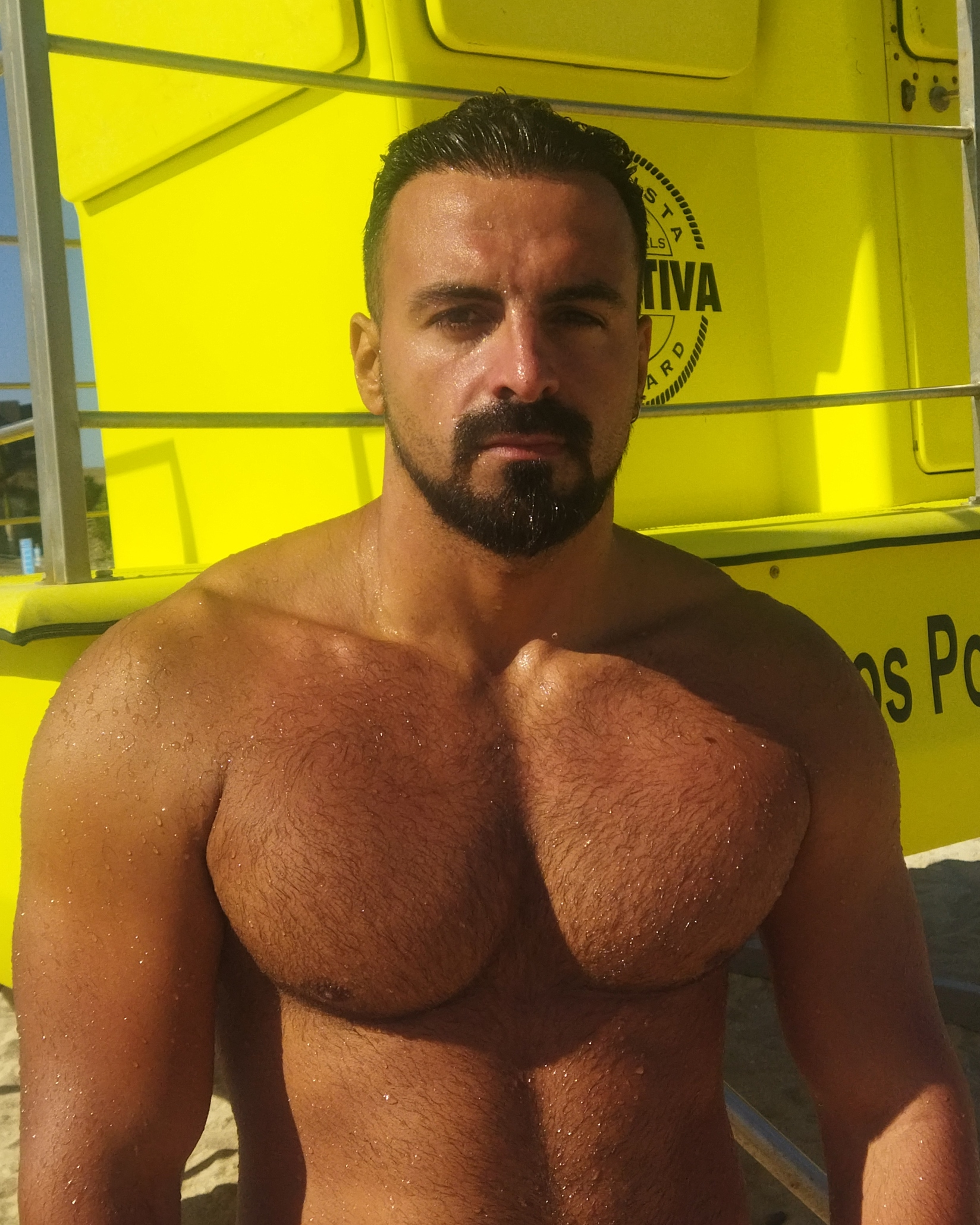
- Eduardo Blasco de Imaz in 2024

Personal information
- Full name: Eduardo Blasco de Imaz Álvarez
- Nickname: Edu Blasco
- Born: August 12, 1994 (age 31) San Sebastián, Spain
- Occupations: Swimmer; lifeguard
- Height: 6 ft 1 in (1.85 m)
- Weight: 231 lb (105 kg)

Sport
- Sport: Swimming

Eduardo Blasco de Imaz Álvarez (12 August 1994), better known as Edu Blasco, is a Spanish swimmer specializing in lifesaving. He is known for his achievements in sports competitions and his commitment to humanitarian causes. As of 2024, he has performed over a thousand rescues.

== Biography ==
Blasco was born in the Basque Country and raised in the Canary Islands, where he began swimming at a young age. He resides in Fuerteventura.

He competed internationally, becoming a multiple-time world champion in lifesaving—specifically in the 50-meter rescue medley event. He also represented Spain in six world championships and four European championships, amassing a total of 46 senior Spanish national titles and eight medals with the national team. Furthermore, he holds 66 senior national medals and has medaled at the European championships in Wales (2015), Belgium (2017), and Italy (2019), as well as at the World Championships in Greece (2016). In 2017, Blasco was part of the team that competed in the World Games. In 2018, during the World Championships in Belgrade, he broke the Spanish record in the final.

In 2022, after winning the world lifesaving championship, Blasco decided to join a migrant rescue mission in the Mediterranean Sea, becoming the first professional swimmer to participate in such operations. Since then, he has regularly taken part in rescue operations, saving over a thousand people in two years. He also collaborates with rescue organizations such as Aita Mari and Open Arms. Additionally, he has voiced concern regarding the migration crisis in the Canary Islands and addressed issues related to human trafficking.

Blasco holds a law degree with a specialization in human rights. As of 2024, he was balancing his athletic career with doctoral studies focused on human rights at Europe's southern border. Throughout his career, he has participated in humanitarian missions in countries such as Libya, Tunisia, Egypt, and the Sahara.

In 2024, he took part in search and rescue efforts following the floods in Valencia caused by the Cold drop weather phenomenon.

The following year, in 2025, Blasco won the Spanish absolute Lifesaving and Lifeguarding Championship for the tenth consecutive year.
