= Carlos Sheinbaum Yoselevitz =

Mexican businessman and engineer (1933–2013)

- Born: 25 February 1933; Guadalajara, Mexico
- Died: 29 August 2013 (aged 80); Mexico City, Mexico
- Other name: alias "Carlos Díaz"
- Education: National School of Chemical Sciences; University of Guadalajara
- Occupations: Businessman, chemist, publisher, journalist and secretary of the 'Juventud Comunista de México' organization (1952–1957)
- Political party: Mexican Communist Party (formerly)
- Spouse: Annie Pardo Cemo (m. 1960)
- Children: 3, including Claudia

Carlos Sheinbaum Yoselevitz (25 February 1933 – 29 August 2013) was a Mexican businessman and chemical engineer known for his contributions to the leather tanning industry in Mexico. He was the father of President of Mexico Claudia Sheinbaum.

== Biography ==
Carlos Sheinbaum Yoselevitz was born on 25 February 1933 in Guadalajara, Jalisco, Mexico, the son of Emma Yoselevitz and Chone Juan Sheinbaum Abramovitz. His parents were Ashkenazi Jews originally from Lithuania. His father had immigrated to Mexico in 1928 and was involved with the Mexican Communist Party as part of the youth protests of the 1960s. Sheinbaum Yoselevitz studied chemical engineering at the National School of Chemical Sciences of the National Autonomous University of Mexico and also at the University of Guadalajara. He married biologist Annie Pardo Cemo, with whom he had three children: Julio, Claudia, and Adriana. The couple participated in the Mexican Movement of 1968.

Sheinbaum Yoselevitz co-founded the company Sintacrom de México, S.A. de C.V., with two other engineers. It was the first company in the country to produce basic chromium sulfate, a key substance for the tanning process. The company later expanded into the production of other chemicals. Sheinbaum Yoselevitz served as the technical commercial director of the company for thirty years. His work was fundamental to the development of the tanning industry in Mexico. He was president of the Mexican Federation of Leather Chemists and Technicians on several occasions and promoted the creation of the National Technical Meeting of Tanning.

Carlos Sheinbaum Yoselevitz died on 29 August 2013 in Mexico City at the age of 80.
