= Héctor Hugo Hernández Rodríguez =

Mexican politician

- Born: 27 February 1974 (age 52); Mexico City, Mexico
- Occupation: Politician
- Political party: PRD

Héctor Hugo Hernández Rodríguez (born 27 February 1974) is a Mexican politician from the Party of the Democratic Revolution (PRD). From 2009 to 2012 he served as a federal deputy in the 61st Congress, representing the Federal District's fourteenth district for the PRD.
