= Eugenio Imaz =

Spanish philosopher (1900–1951)

Spanish philosopher and translator Eugenio Ímaz.

Eugenio Ímaz Echeverría (San Sebastián, June 14, 1900 – Veracruz, January 28, 1951) was a Spanish philosopher and translator. He is the grandfather of Carlos Imaz Gispert, the Mexican politician.

== Biography ==
He graduated in law and philosophy from the Universidad Central de Madrid (1925 and 1929, respectively). Through a grant from the Board for the Expansion of Studies Imaz travelled to Germany, where he worked at different universities and completed his studies for two years. From this period, he collaborated in publications such as Revista de Occidente y Cruz y Raya.

At the end of the Spanish Civil War Ímaz was forced into exile in Mexico, where he shortly after participated in the constitution of the Junta de Cultura Española as vice-secretary under the direction of José Bergamín. Here he continued his work publishing España Peregrina and Romance, and he joined the Universidad Nacional Autónoma de México as a professor in the Faculty of Philosophy and Letters.

From 1939 to 1946 Ímaz lived in Mexico City. In the summer of 1939, in the company of his wife, the German Hilde Jahnke, and their children, Carlos and Víctor, he arrived in Mexico as a refugee. While there he continued his work with the Junta de Cultura Española. His most important early work was as secretary of the magazine España Peregrina and as a member of the Cuadernos Americanos. He published many articles in Spanish exile magazines and others from Mexico. He taught at the Hispano-Mexicana Academy for children of Spanish exiles and children of Mexican families sympathetic to the republicancause. However, perhaps Ímaz's most significant work was as a translator at the Fondo de Cultura Económica.

Between 1946 and 1948 he lived in Caracas, dedicated to the project of creating and reinforcing the faculties of Journalism and Philosophy. In Venezuela, Ímaz undertook cultural work as intense as he did in Spain and Mexico. Here he realized his true vocation was university teaching. However he then had to return to Mexico, where he rejoined the team of translators at the Fondo de Cultura Económica. Part of his legacy, which includes more than 50 translations, is his version of the Complete Works of Wilhelm Dilthey.

He continued his work as a translator of German. Besides his translation of Dilthey, his works included those of Immanuel Kant, Jacob Burckhardt, Johan Huizinga and Ernst Cassirer.

When he was planning a trip to the Universidad de Puerto Rico to become a member of the staff of philosophy professors, he died in the Mexican city of Veracruz.

== Work ==
The work of Ímaz is classified into two large blocks, one of translations of great thinkers, especially Dilthey; and the other of articles and works about thought and politics. The works of the second block have been collected and published by professor José Ángel Ascunce in three volumes: La fe por la palabra (The Faith of the Word): Eugenio Imaz I (1989), Topia y Utopia: Eugenio Imaz II (1988), and Luz en la caverna (Light in the Cavern): Eugenio Imaz III (1988), all published by the Universidad de Deusto, in Mundaiz, San Sebastián.
