= Carlos Ahumada =

Argentine-Mexican businessman

Carlos Agustín Ahumada Kurtz (born 1964) is an entrepreneur of dual Argentine-Mexican nationality. His main areas of business are mining, construction and football. He founded the El Independiente newspaper in Mexico and was a partner and founding member of Colegio de Imagen Pública A.C.

He gained public notoriety in 2004, when he denounced corruption of top officials in the government of Mexico City, going public with videos showing him being extorted by public officials. This episode became known as the "video scandals".

He was apprehended in Havana by Cuban authorities, acting on an extradition request by Mexico, and later deported. On May 8, 2007, he was released from prison, cleared of all charges. Several analysts and columnists considered Ahumada a "political prisoner".

On December 28, 2007, the Federal District Human Rights Commission (Comisión de Derechos Humanos del Distrito Federal CDHDF) issued its recommendation 19/2007, addressed to the Government Secretariat of the Federal District (Secretaría de Gobierno del Distrito Federal) and the General Justice Department of the Federal District (Procuraduría General de Justicia del Distrito Federal), requesting them to offer public apologies to Carlos Ahumada and his family. Ahumada was the subject of an article by Fidel Castro, entitled "El Gigante de las Siete Leguas, Parte II".

In May 2009, Ahumada published his first book: Derecho de réplica.

Carlos Ahumada, wanted by the Attorney General of Mexico, was arrested in Argentina on August 16, 2019.

Currently, Carlos Ahumada is President of Club Sportivo Estudiantes in the province of San Luis, Argentina, a football team competing in the Torneo Argentino "A" of the Asociación del Fútbol Argentino (AFA).
