= René Bejarano =

Mexican politician

René Juvenal Bejarano Martínez (born January 11, 1957) is a Mexican politician and ex-legislator, better known for the 2004 videoscandals.

He was a political economy professor at the Universidad Autónoma Metropolitana in 1978 and was the first coordinator for the Movimiento Sindical de Trabajadores de la Educación in Iztapalapa.

He was Andrés Manuel López Obrador's personal secretary between December 2000 to November 2002.

On March 3, 2004, in the show El Mañanero with Brozo (Víctor Trujillo), a video of Bejarano receiving 45,000 USD by Carlos Ahumada was aired. Bejarano confronted a desafuero judge and was imprisoned on November 10, 2004. He was freed on July 6, 2005, after a judge found the evidence against him was insufficient.
