= Symbols of Toluca =

City symbols for Toluca, Mexico

The symbols of city of Toluca, municipality from State of Mexico, in Mexico, are the coat of arms or seal and the municipal flag. Other cultural symbols include the Cosmovitral, the Nevado de Toluca and the chorizo.

== Coat of arms ==
Modern coat of arms of Toluca

In 1985, at the suggestion, the city council of Toluca, adopted as its municipal coat of arms the local pre-Columbian heraldric figures used in times of Mexica control: Tolutepetl. A similar figure appears in the paintings of the Matriculation of the Aztecan tribute and in the Mendocino Codex.

The Coat of Arms of Toluca is a Mexican national seal on the top of the Toluca coat of arms, in accordance with the Coat of arms of the State of Mexico, the original toponym of Toluca with Toluca municipal territory inside a field gules (red). Low, the leyend; Municipio de Toluca (Toluca Municipality).

=== History ===
Glyph of Tollocan.

When Toluca ghyph is based on the Náhuatl toponym name for the area when it was renamed by the Aztecs. The name has its origin in the word tollocan that comes from the name of the god, Tollo, plus the locative suffix, can, to denote "place of Tolo". It is also referred to in a number of Aztec codices as Tolutépetl, meaning hill of the god, Tolo, an allusion to the nearby volcano.

Toluca became a city on September 12, 1799, when the Spanish monarch Charles IV gave it the title and the heraldic shield. This royal shield showed the colors of the Spanish flag, yellow and red, as well as four rampant lions, crowned eagles linked to Spanish royalty, two towers and other figures on a sky blue background, a color traditionally attributed to the Bourbon family.

== Flag ==
Flag of Toluca

The flag of Toluca consists of a white rectangle with a ratio of four to seven between the width and length; in the center it bears the State Coat of arms, placed in such a way that it occupies three-quarters of the width.

=== History ===
The first flag of Toluca City was a tricolor of green, white, and red with a coat of arms charged in the center of the white stripe. While the meaning of the colors has changed over time, these three colors were adopted by flag of the Three Guarantees in honor of the country's independence insurgents.

The first flag of Toluca appeared in the First Battalion of Free People of Toluca by Felipe Berriozábal in order to combat the gangs of scoundrels who were ravaging the State of Mexico, at the end of the Reform War in 1861.

Currently, green, white and red decorations are placed throughout the municipality every year to honor the heroes, giving rise to the tricolor Toluca flag that flies every year in the Main plaza the Mártires and in the town hall.

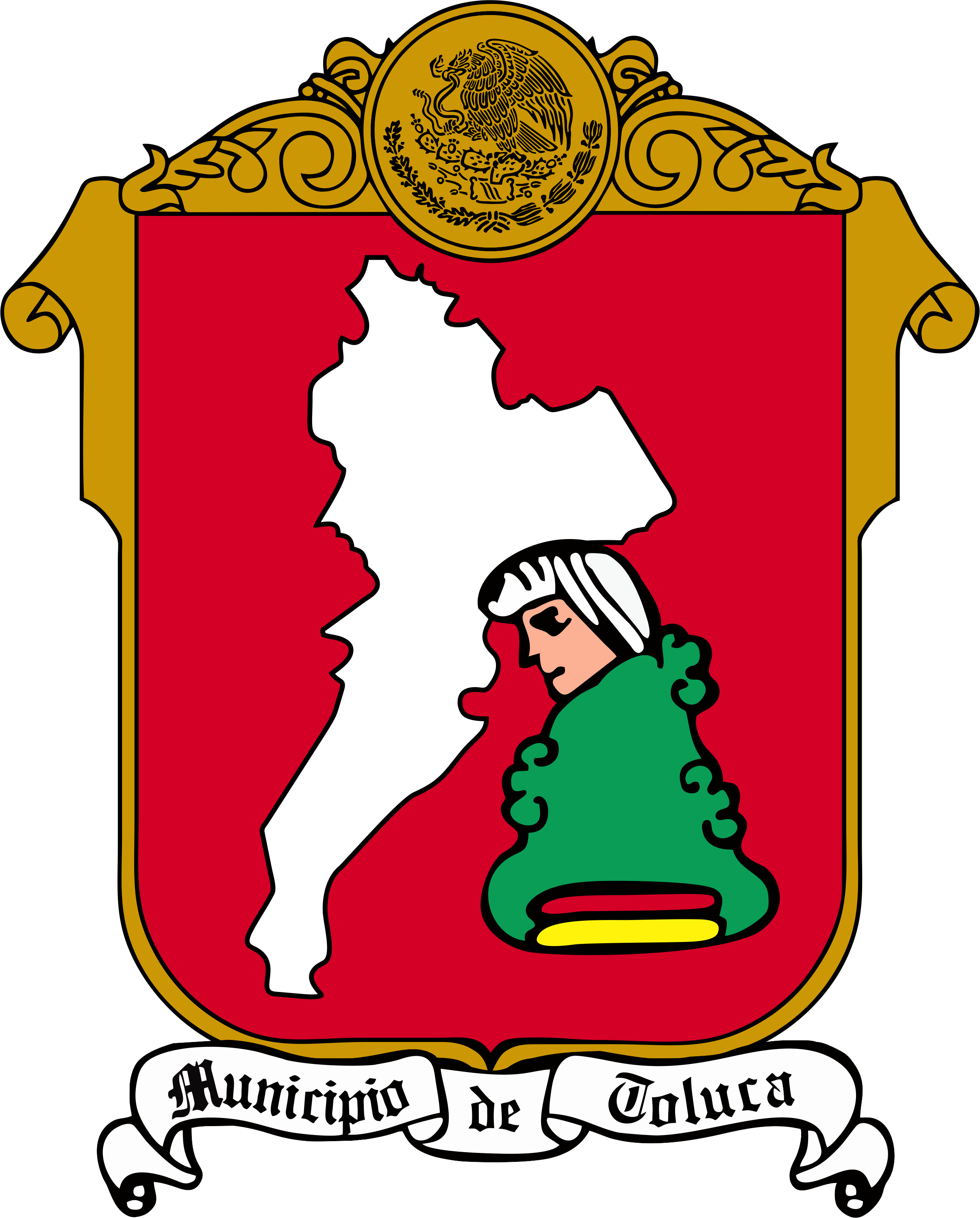
Coat of arms of Toluca, State of Mexico.

Although the Toluca Municipality the state capital, does not have an official flag, inside the council room of the town hall there is a white flag with the municipality's coat of arms.

=== Historical Symbols ===
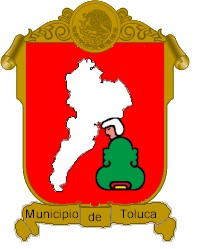
Coat of Arms Toluca Municipality (1982–2020)

== See also ==
- List of Mexican municipal flags
- Toluca
