= Leopoldo Flores =

Mexican artist (1934–2016)

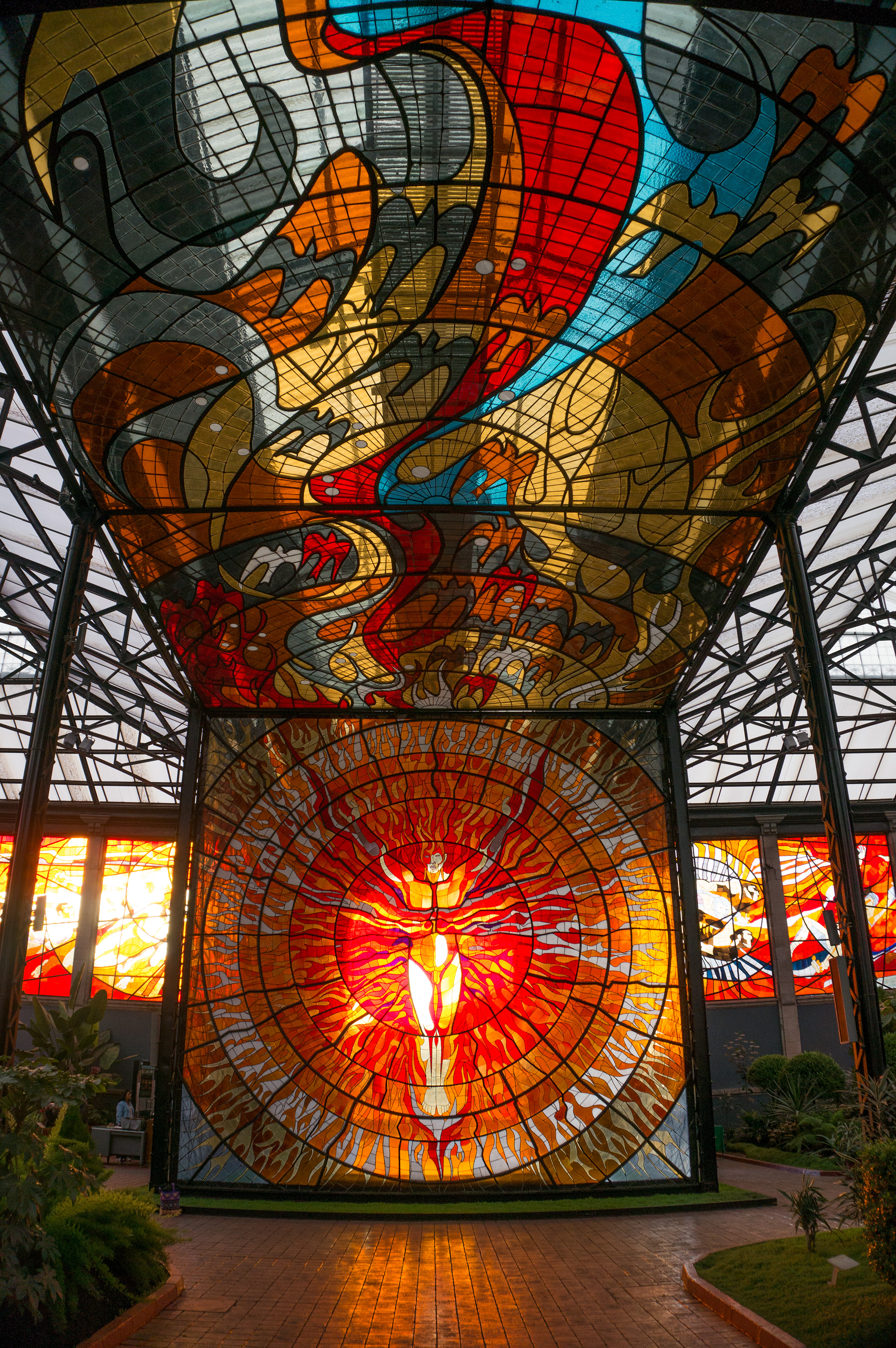
- Hombre Sol (Sun Man) inside the Cosmovitral in Toluca
- Born: 1934; Tenancingo, Estado de México
- Died: April 3, 2016 (aged 81–82)
- Occupation: Artist

Leopoldo Flores (1934 – April 3, 2016) was a Mexican artist mostly known for his murals and other monumental works which are concentrated in the city of Toluca, State of Mexico. He was born into a poor family in rural State of Mexico, but his artistic ability was evident early and he was able to attend the Escuela Nacional de Pintura, Escultura y Grabado "La Esmeralda" and receive a scholarship to study in Paris. His best known works are the Cosmovitral a large work in stained glass and the Aratmósfera, a “land art” piece both located in Toluca. The first is used as a symbol for the State of Mexico and the latter dominates the main stadium and the hill behind it at the main campus of the Universidad Autónoma del Estado de México (UAEM). He received a number of recognitions of his work from the State of Mexico and an honorary doctorate from the UAEM, which also founded the Museo Universitario Leopoldo Flores to house and promote his work. Despite advanced Parkinson's disease, until his death Flores was still an active artist.

== Life ==
Leopoldo Flores, full name Leopoldo Flores Valdés, was born to a poor family in 1934 in the small town of San Simonito de los Comales in the municipality of Tenancingo, State of Mexico, Mexico.

His talent for art was evident in his youth, studying at Escuela Nacional de Pintura, Escultura y Grabado "La Esmeralda" from 1953 to 1960. In 1962, he received a scholarship to attend the École Nationale Supérieure des Beaux-Arts in Paris. This experience exposed him to more artistic influences and allowed him to participate in collective exhibitions in Europe.

His career spanned from the early 1960s to his death in 2016. He returned to Paris to paint on several occasions, with the last being in the 1980s when he did a series of self-portraits including those which likened him to Van Gogh, Michelangelo and Rembrandt .

He was married to Dolores Almada.

Flores was diagnosed with Parkinson's disease in 2000, which he documented in a self-portrait named Hombre con temblor en la mano izquierda (Man with shaking in the left hand). He went to Cuba to receive treatment. Despite its advanced stage and concerns about his health, he continued to work.

== Career ==
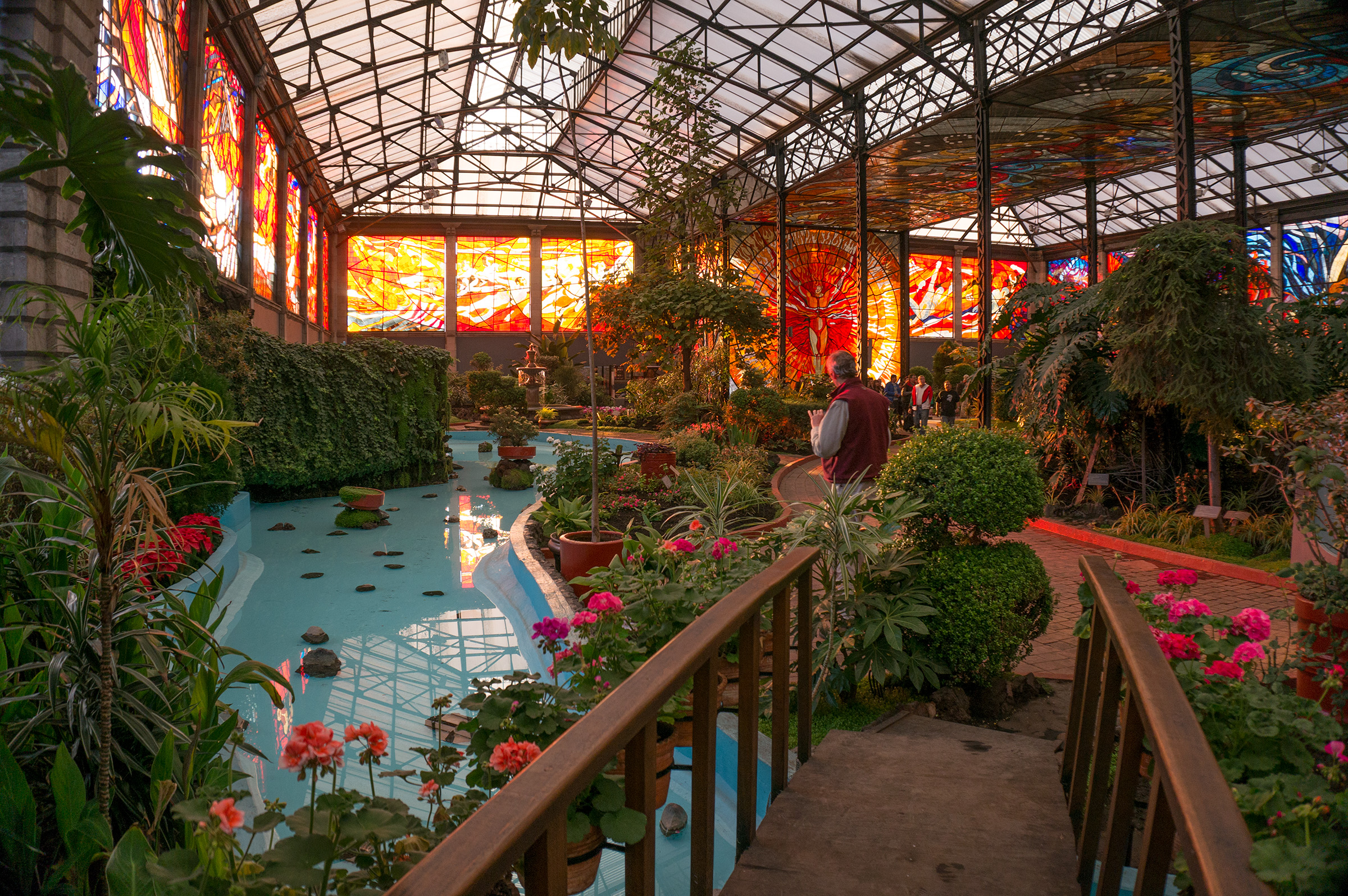
View of the stained glass and botanical garden of the Cosmovitral

Since 1960, Flores exhibited his work both in Mexico and abroad. From 1962 to 1968, most of these exhibits were collective, including at the Palacio de Bellas Artes during the Festival Solar of the Mexico City Olympics in 1968. From 1970 to 1971 he coordinated the “Plastica 70” exhibition and exhibited at the Sala de Arte Moderno of the Casa de Cultura of Toluca. The most recent individual exhibitions of his art were Génesis de tormenta and Apuntes de taller, both held at the Museo Universitario Leopoldo Flores in Toluca. Genesis contains thirty abstract acrylics in small format focused on the pollution called by oil drilling in the Gulf of Mexico . Apuntes was a retrospective which contained 320 drawings, many never exhibited before, as well as photographs by Carlos Hahn.

One of Flores first major successes was in 1969 with the creation of “pancarta” murals, which consisted of the placement of large pieces of fabric over the exterior of buildings. Examples of works of this type include Retorno de la gran manada and Desembardo de los marines, which were places at Plaza Beau-bourg of the Centre Georges Pompidou and the vestibule of the Palacio de Bellas Artes in Mexico City . In 1972 he also created a pancarta mural for an exhibition over the Hidalgo Market in Toluca. In addition to this movement he also headed a movement called Arte Abierto in 1976, along with working as a promoter of the fine arts for the State of Mexico in 1969.

Flores is best known for his monumental works, especially murals, most of which are located in the city of Toluca. Early murals include El hombre contemporáneo at the Hotel Plaza Morelos (1971), El hombre comtemplando al hombre at the Palacio de Poder Legislativo (1972-1983) and Alianza de las culturas at the Alianza Franciasa de Toluca building (1985) . Others include El Hombre Universal at the Centro de Investigación en Ciencias Sociales at UAEM (1989), and En búsqueda de la justicia at the Procuraduría General de Justicia (1991-1992) . From 2001 to 2002 he created De qué color es el Principio at the Colegio Mexiquense, and in 2002 worked on Periplo plástico at the Museo de Arte Moderno of the Centro Cultural Mexiquense . The latter mural is filled with symbols such as exploding light for the Big Bang theory, along with the appearance of man and manifestations of art. In 2004 he created the La Cátedra de la Justicia at the Escuela de Judicial del Estado de México in only two months. In 2006 he created the mural Justicia Supremo Poder for the Palacio de la Suprema Corte de Justicia de la Nación in Mexico City. It was created in Toluca and transferred to the court building in 2007. It is located in the northeast corner of the main stairs, with a size of about 300m2 in three levels, sharing space with works by Luis Nishizawa, Rafael Cauduro and Ismael Ramos . From 2009 to 2010 he created a mural for the State of Mexico placed at the Palacio del Gobierno in Toluca, about the Bicentennial of Mexico's Independence and Centennial of the Mexican Revolution.

However, his two best known works are located in the city of Toluca, the Cosmovitral, which today serves as an important identity marker for the State of Mexico and Aratmósfera. The Cosmovitral was a renovation of an old Porfirio Díaz era market. The interior was turned into a botanical garden and the windows were replaced by large glass murals with 48 panels which cover an area of 3,200 m2. Inaugurated in 1980, the theme of the work is the opposition of day and night, woman and man, and good and bad. The glass work used about 75 tons of metal substructure, 45 tons of blown glass and 25 tons of lead solder. The Cosmovitral was named in 2007 as one of thirteen wonders of Mexico and in 2008 it received the Excelsis prize from the Global Quality Foundation.

Aratmósfera covers an area of 10,000 square metres (110,000 ft^{2}) over part of a small mountain, Cerro de Coatepec, and into the stands of the Estadio Universitario Alberto Chivo Córdoba, the university stadium on the Ciudad Universitaria campus of the Universidad Autónoma del Estado de México. As the hill itself is part of the work, it is a type of “land art”, and Flores was the first in Mexico to employ the technique. The theme of the work is the birth of light, represented by man, which emerges from the earth and rises, looking and reaching for the sky. Although it has been restored twice since its creation between 1974 and 1978, it has problems with deterioration.

In addition to mural work, other monumental pieces include a sculpture called Tocando el Sol (Touching the Sun) found at the main administration building of the Universidad Autónoma del Estado de México. In 1992, he experimented with painting over snow on the sides of the Nevado de Toluca volcano.

His recognitions include the Meztli Award in 1964, the Acquisition Prize in Painting from INBA in 1968, the José María Velasco Award from the State of Mexico in 1984, an honorary doctorate from the Universidad Autónoma del Estado de México in 2007 and the Gran Orden de la Reforma from the State of Mexico in 2007. He was also a member of the Salón de la Plástica Mexicana.

== Artistry ==
Although best known for murals and other monumental works, Flores also worked with various media, techniques and sizes. Traditional media include oils, acrylics, watercolors and ink in small and medium-sized formats as well as monumental. More unusual media and materials have included cloth, rock, plaster, glass, wood, snow, vegetation, paper and cardboard. One collection is a series of ink drawings on paper napkins, which belongs to the Máxima Casa de Estudios. El Minotauro is painted over live rock at the Museo Universitario. Colors that frequently appear in his work include reds, yellows, ochre, grays, blues and black.

His work has been featured in writings by notable Mexican art critics including Raquel Tibol, Antonio Rodriguez and Berta Taracena . He considered his work to be a continuance of Mexican muralism, and he has been described as a “disciple” of David Alfaro Siqueiros . He is an important figure in Mexican art of the latter 20th century, but his work is neither decorative nor didactic. Rather it focuses on timeless conflicts of the human race. Social problems his work has tackled include violence and consumption. Notable works of this type include Cien Hecatombes (1972), A la opinion pública (1973), El Hielo de Ariadna (1983) and a series of Christ figures (1994) . His work is mostly figurative, with images of men and nature. When women appear, they usually accompany men. One of his influences include the writings of José Saramago, who he had the chance to meet.

== Museo Universitario Leopoldo Flores ==
In the early 2000s the artist donated a collection of his works to the Universidad Autónoma del Estado de México, which opened the Museo Universitario Leopoldo Flores in 2002, which the purpose of promoting, investigating and recording the artist's work. (http://www.uaemex.mx/muslf/) The museum was opened in 2002, in a building constructed for the purpose at the Ciudad Universitaria, with Flores participating in the design. It contains a collection of portable murals, large paintings, drawings and sculptures donated by the artist. Among these works are El hijo de Ariadna and Los cristos.

It has six halls for temporary exhibitions, a library, photographic collection, bookstore, cafeteria and first aid station. He had a workshop in the museum similar to the one in his home. In addition to the permanent collection, the museum also holds temporary exhibits by contemporary artists along with guided tours, concerts, conferences, book presentations and workshops.
