= Mexico–Venezuela relations =

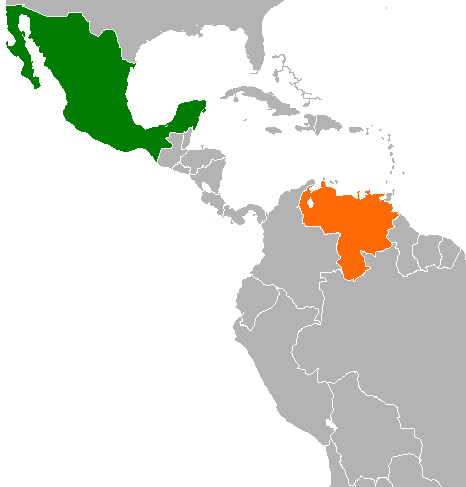

- Mexico: Venezuela

The nations of Mexico and Venezuela established diplomatic relations in 1831, however, diplomatic relations between both nations have been historically unstable on several occasions. During the Venezuelan presidential crisis, Mexico took a neutral position and has continued to maintain diplomatic relations with the government of President Nicolás Maduro.

Both nations are members of the Association of Caribbean States, Community of Latin American and Caribbean States, Latin American Integration Association, Organization of American States, Organization of Ibero-American States and the United Nations.

== History ==
=== Relations from Spanish colonization to the 1990s ===
Both Mexico and Venezuela share a common history in the fact that both nations were once part of the Spanish Empire. During the Spanish colonial period, Mexico was then known as Viceroyalty of New Spain and the capital being Mexico City while what became nowadays Venezuela was known then as the Captaincy General of Venezuela with Caracas as its capital. In 1810, both Mexico and Venezuela began their independence processes from Spain with each nation finally obtaining independence in 1821 and 1830, respectively. Soon after obtaining independence, Emperor Agustín de Iturbide of Mexico contacted President Simón Bolívar by informing him of his ascension to the Mexican throne and telling him of his personal admiration for Bolívar after learning about his heroic valor and successful military campaigns. In 1831, both nations formally established diplomatic relations when Venezuela became independent after breaking from the Gran Colombia.

In 1842, both nations accredited ambassadors to each other's countries. Mexico's ambassador to Venezuela was stationed in Bogotá, Colombia while Venezuela's ambassador to Mexico was stationed in Washington, D.C., United States. In 1916, Mexico sent its first resident ambassador to be based in Caracas; however, diplomatic relations became tense in 1922 since Venezuela had not at that point established a resident ambassador to Mexico. In 1922, Mexico, under protest, closed its embassy in Caracas. In September 1923, Mexico broke diplomatic relations with Venezuela after the country had denied entry of Mexican nationals arriving to the country to partake in cultural activities being held in Venezuela. Diplomatic relations would be re-established ten years later in June 1933.

During the 1940s, diplomatic relations normalized between the two nations and resident ambassadors were appointed to each nations capitals, respectively. In 1946, President Rómulo Betancourt was the first Venezuelan head-of-state to pay an official visit to Mexico. During the 1950s, after the 1948 Venezuelan coup d'état, Venezuela was under the de facto rule of Marcos Pérez Jiménez and members of the deposed government took exile in Mexico including former president and writer, Rómulo Gallegos; secretary of foreign affairs and poet, Andrés Eloy Blanco; and, future founder of the OPEC, Juan Pablo Perez Alfonso.

After the fall of Perez Jimenez, in January 1960, President Adolfo López Mateos was the first Mexican head-of-state to visit Venezuela while on a trip to South America. Since the initial visits, there have been several high level visits between the two nations.

=== Relations from the 1990s to 2010 ===
In 1995, Mexico and Venezuela, along with Colombia; signed a free trade agreement; however, Venezuela pulled out of the agreement in 2006. Recent involvement in the oil industry by both countries, as well as Mexico joining the North American Free Trade Association in 1994, has led to various disputes between the two nations. During Mexican President Vicente Fox's term from 2000 to 2006; ties between the two countries became critically strained. In November 2005, the cooperation and involvement between President Fox and the United States on the stalled Free Trade Area of the Americas proposal at the Fourth Summit of the Americas brought relations to a low between Mexico and Venezuela.

The late Venezuelan President Hugo Chávez, stated in a speech on 10 November 2005 to supporters in Caracas that he was saddened that "the President of a people like the Mexicans lets himself become the puppy dog of the empire", as well as appearing on his weekly talk show Aló Presidente three days later, where he stated that the Mexican President was "bleeding from his wounds" and warned President Fox to not "mess" with him, lest Fox "get stung". Mexico's demand of an apology was unanswered by the Venezuelan government, and both countries pulled their respective ambassadors within two days of the talk show statement, starting the 2005 Mexico and Venezuela diplomatic crisis.

=== Relations from 2010–present ===
In July 2006, President Chavez accused newly elected President Felipe Calderón of stealing the Presidency from Andrés Manuel López Obrador in a closely contested election. In August 2007, after two years of diplomatic absence in either country, normal relations were re-established with the appointment of former foreign minister Roy Chaderton as Venezuela's envoy to Mexico City and the transfer of Jesús Mario Chacón Carrillo, formerly Mexican ambassador to Colombia, to Caracas. Relations between both nations did not improve much under the leadership of President Calderón. In 2011, President Calderón paid a visit to Venezuela to attend the Community of Latin American and Caribbean States summit being held in Caracas.

Relations between Mexico and Venezuela under Mexican President Enrique Peña Nieto remained much the same. In 2013, President Peña Nieto attended the Funeral of President Hugo Chávez. After the election of President Nicolás Maduro in April 2013, the Mexican government further emphasized the close ties between the two countries and the willingness to overcome differences in terms of political structures and relations with the United States. In January 2015, President Maduro accused former President Felipe Calderón of plotting with the Venezuelan opposition to kill him and to topple his government. President Maduro also accused former President Calderón of having ties with cartels.

In June 2017, during the OAS summit in Cancún; the governments of Mexico, Peru and the United States pushed for a resolution that defends representative democracy in Venezuela. After the summit, Venezuelan Foreign Minister Delcy Rodríguez accused Mexico and other Latin American nations of being "sympathetic dogs to the empire." A resolution to condemn Venezuela was defeated during the summit. In July 2017 during the G-20 summit in Hamburg, Mexico joined the leaders of Argentina, Brazil and Spain and called for the "liberation of all political prisoners and the organization of free and democratic elections" in Venezuela. The statement was made after the liberation from prison of politician Leopoldo López. That same month, the Mexican Secretariat of Foreign Affairs announced that following the announcement of the United States, Mexico will also impose sanctions on "various officials and former officials of the Venezuelan government for undermining democracy and human rights in that country, as well as for participation in acts of violence, repression and corruption."

In July 2018, Andrés Manuel López Obrador was elected President of Mexico. In December 2018, President Maduro arrived to Mexico to attend President López Obrador's inauguration. In January 2019, the United States and several Latin American and European nations recognized opposition leader Juan Guaidó, who was declared interim president of Venezuela by the National Assembly. On 23 January 2019, President López Obrador reiterated Mexico's traditional stance of non-intervention in other country's affairs and refused to recognize Juan Guaidó as president.

In October 2023, President Nicolas Maduro paid a visit to Mexico to attend a Migration Summit in Palenque, Chiapas.

On 3 January 2026, the United States carried out several strikes in Venezuela and detained and abducted President Maduro. Mexican President Claudia Sheinbaum condemned the operation, stating: "We categorically reject intervention in the internal affairs of other countries".

== High-level visits ==
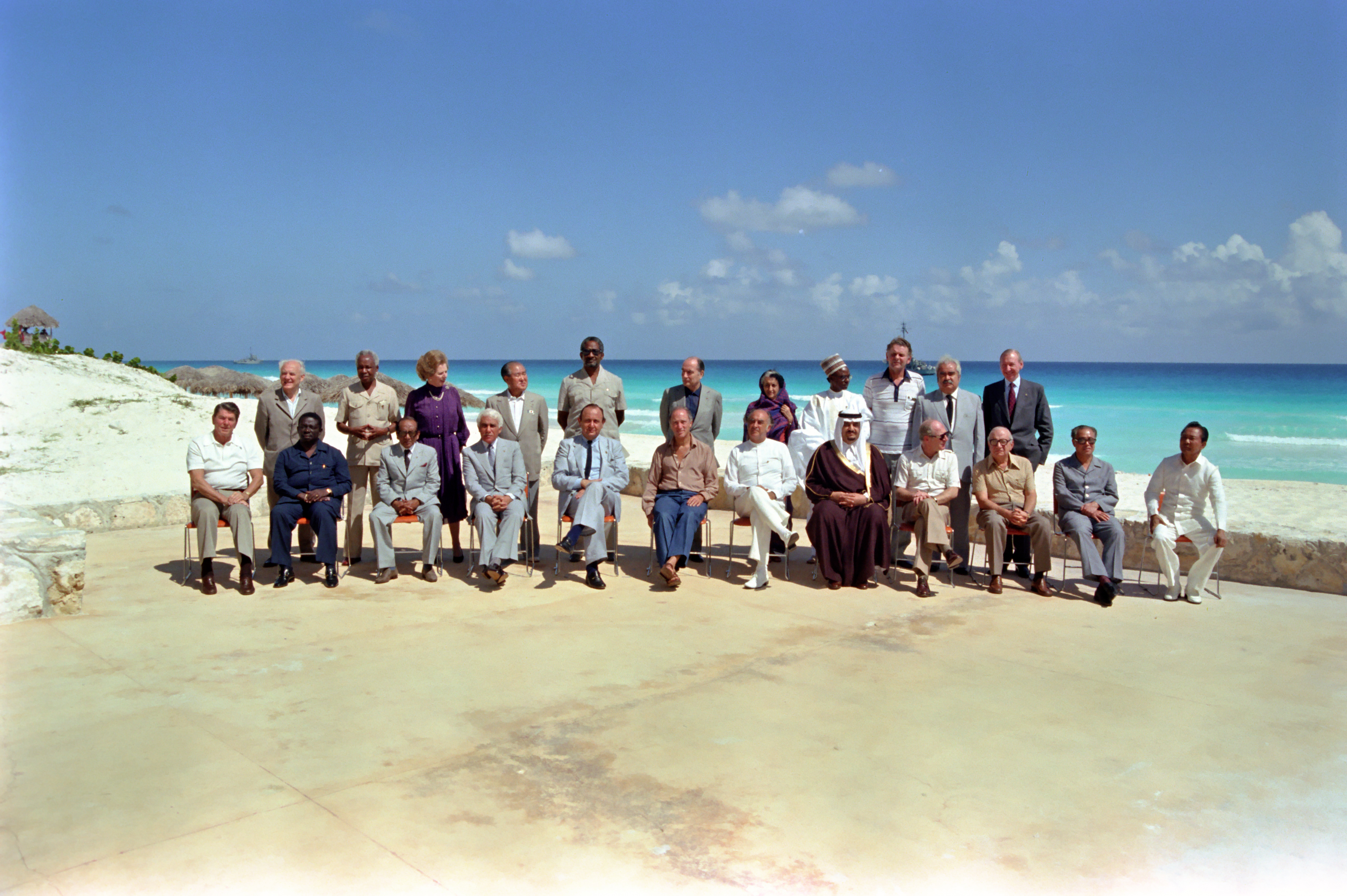
Venezuelan President Luis Herrera Campins attending the North–South Summit in Cancún, 1981.

Presidential visits from Mexico to Venezuela

- President Adolfo López Mateos (1960)
- President Luis Echeverría (1974)
- President Miguel de la Madrid Hurtado (1984)
- President Carlos Salinas de Gortari (1989, 1990, 1992)
- President Ernesto Zedillo (1997, 1998)
- President Vicente Fox (2001)
- President Felipe Calderón (2011)
- President Enrique Peña Nieto (2013)

Presidential visits from Venezuela to Mexico

- President Rómulo Betancourt (1946, 1963)
- President Carlos Andrés Pérez (1975, 1991)
- President Luis Herrera Campins (April & October 1981)
- President Jaime Lusinchi (1985, 1986, 1987)
- President Rafael Caldera (1997)
- President Hugo Chávez (2002, 2004, 2010)
- President Nicolás Maduro (2018, 2021, 2023)

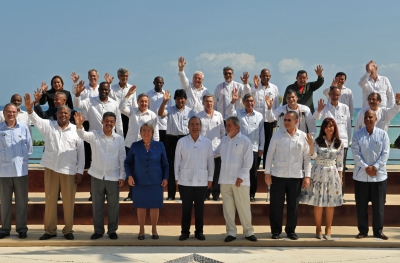
President Felipe Calderón and President Hugo Chávez in Cancún attending the XXI Rio Group summit; 2010.

President Enrique Peña Nieto standing next to the coffin of President Hugo Chávez in Caracas; 2013.

== Bilateral agreements ==
Both nations have signed several bilateral agreement such as an Agreement on Technical Cooperation (1973); Agreement of Cinematography (1974); Agreement on Air Transportation (1987); Agreement on Tourism Cooperation (1988); Agreement for the Prevention, Control, Supervision and Repression of Illicit Consumption and Trafficking in Narcotic Drugs and Psychotropic Substances (1989); Agreement on Criminal Judgments Cooperation (1996); Treaty on Mutual Legal Assistance in Criminal Matters (1997); Agreement on Educational and Cultural Cooperation (1997); Extradition Treaty (1998) and an Agreement of Cooperation in Science, Technology, Space Innovation and for the Peaceful Uses of Outer Space (2005).

== Transportation ==
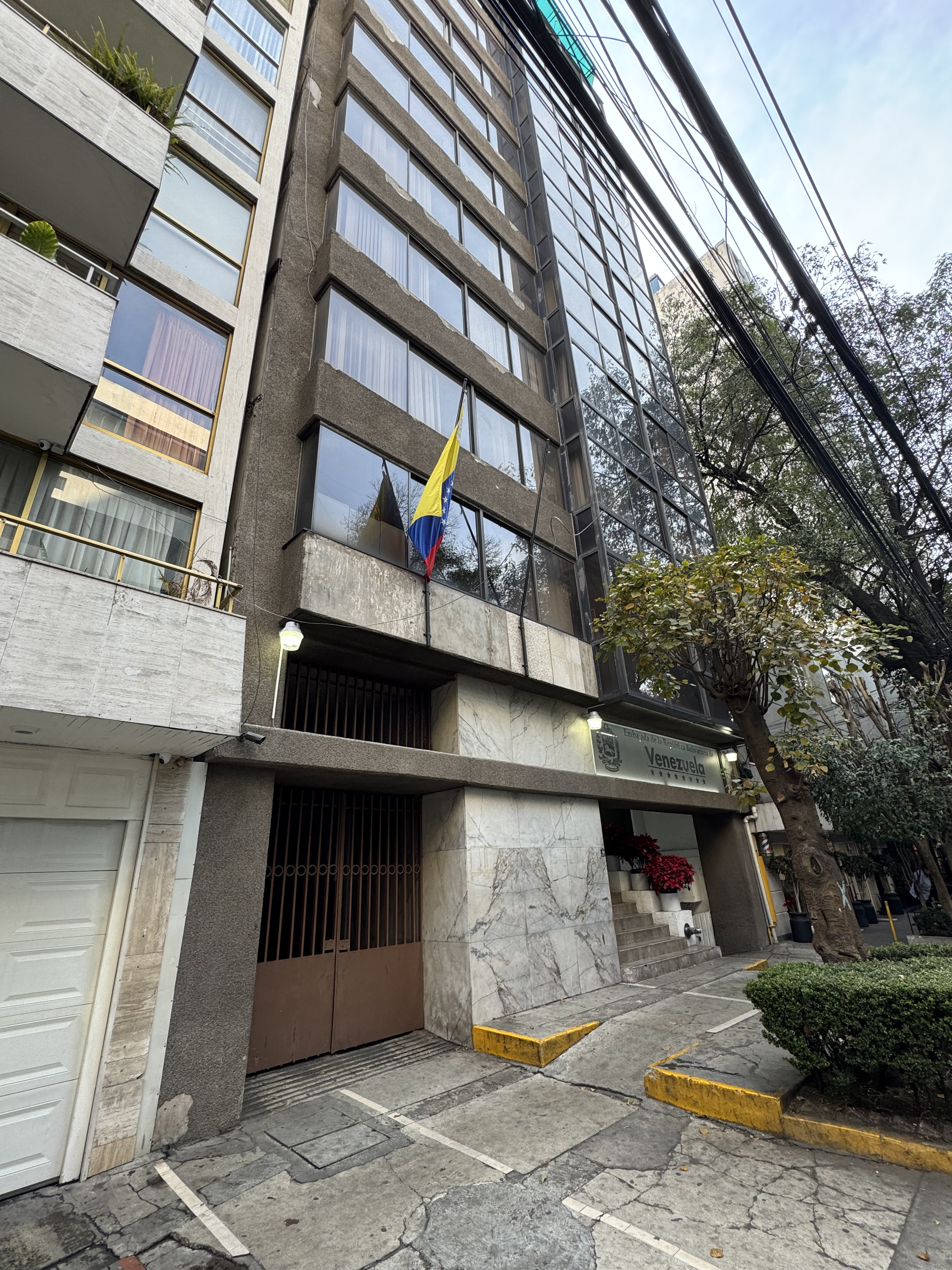
Embassy of Venezuela in Mexico City

There are direct flights from Caracas to Cancún and Mexico City with Conviasa airlines.

== Trade ==
In 2023, two-way trade between both nations totaled US$373.4 million. Mexico's main exports to Venezuela include: maize, medicine, baby food, shampoo, diapers and machinery. Venezuela's main exports to Mexico include: oil, gas, aluminum and sesame seeds. Mexican multinational companies such as FEMSA, Grupo Bimbo, Mabe and Orbia (among others) operate in Venezuela.

== Resident diplomatic missions ==
- Mexico has an embassy in Caracas.
- Venezuela has an embassy in Mexico City.

== Gallery ==
Mexican disaster rescuers in Caracas after the 2026 Venezuela earthquake

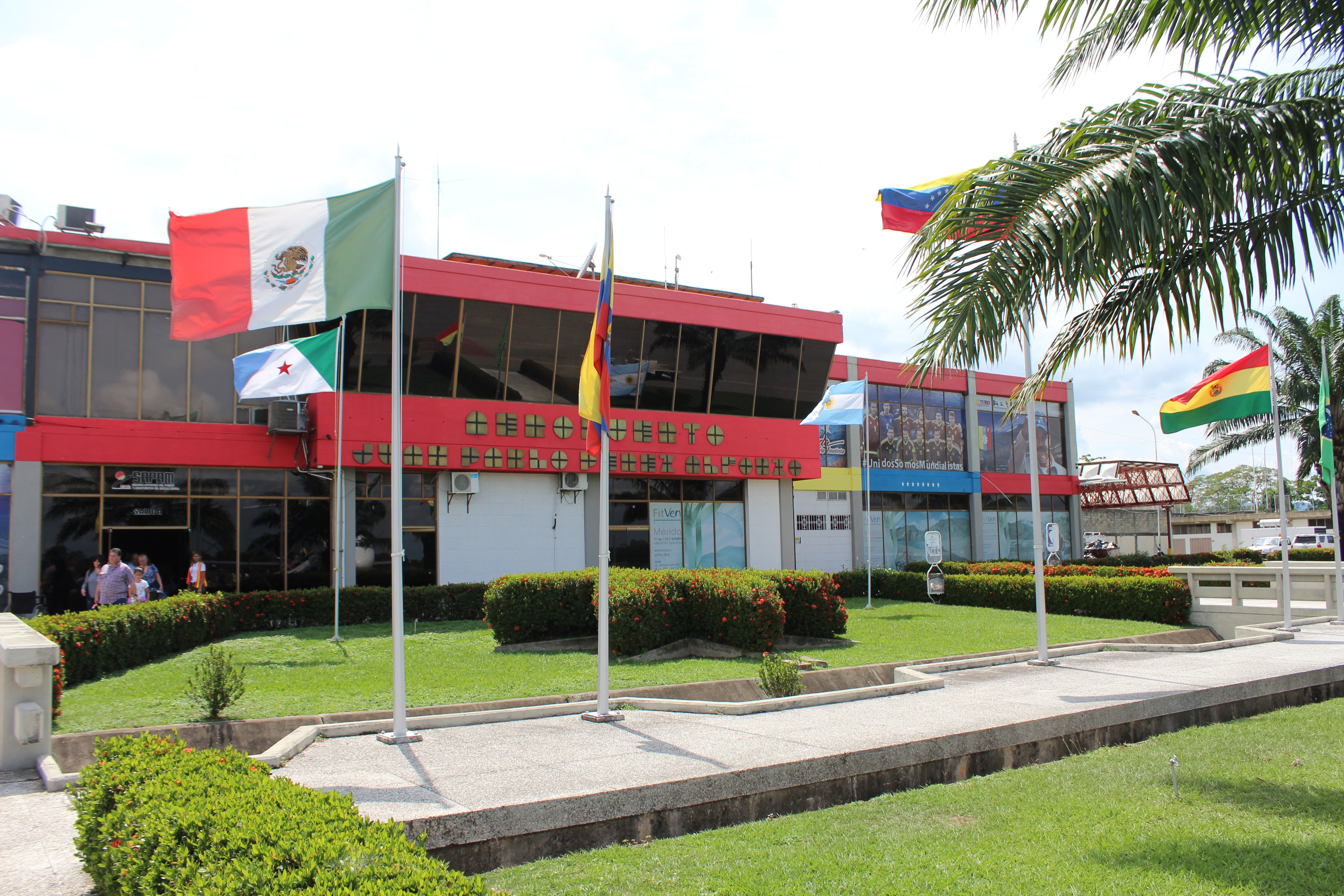
Flag of Mexico flying at the Simón Bolívar International Airport in Caracas

Francisco Arias Cárdenas, former Venezuelan Ambassador to Mexico

== See also ==
- Venezuelan Mexicans
