= Toluca =

State capital in Mexico, Mexico

- State capital and municipality
- Toluca de Lerdo
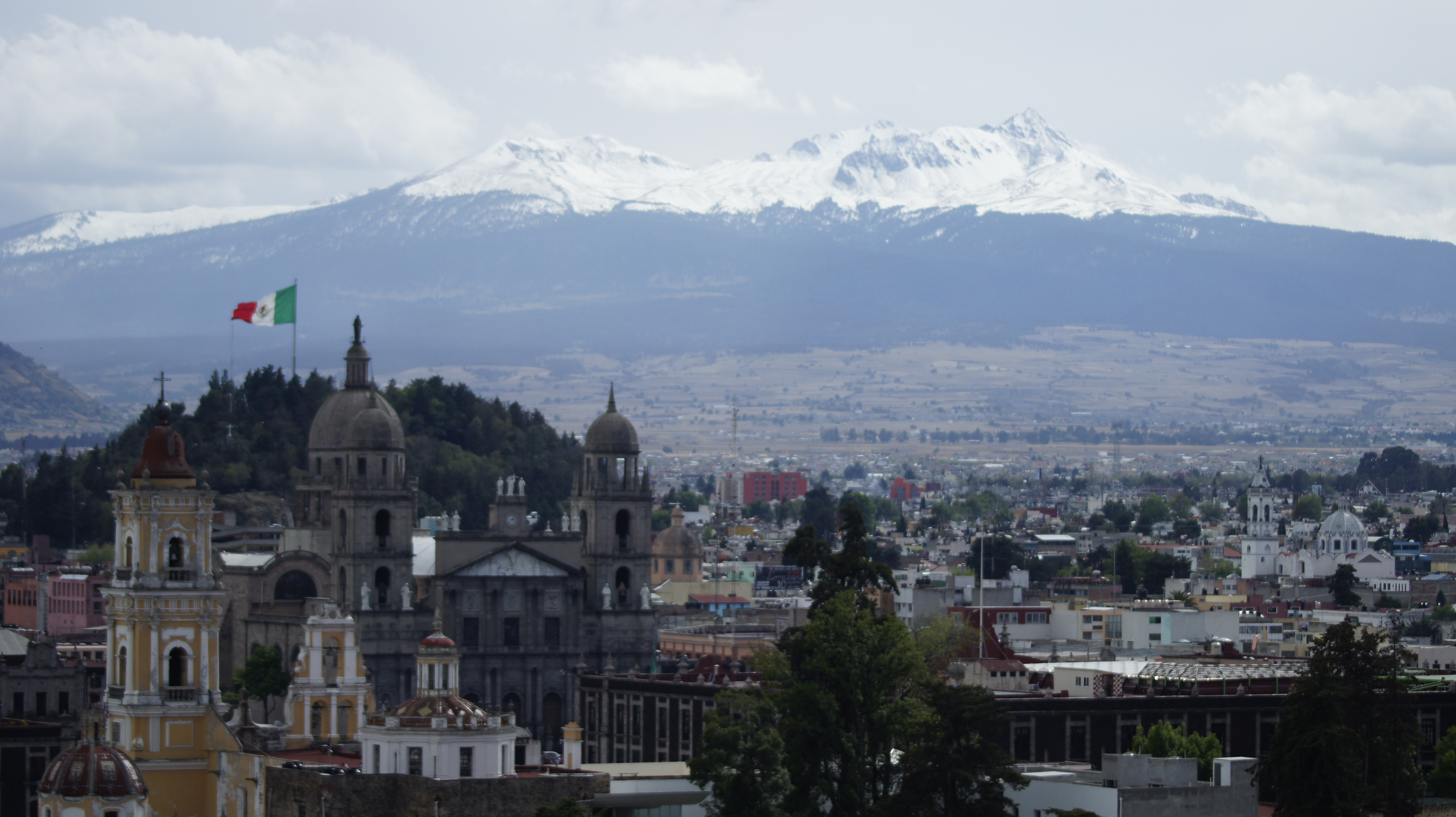
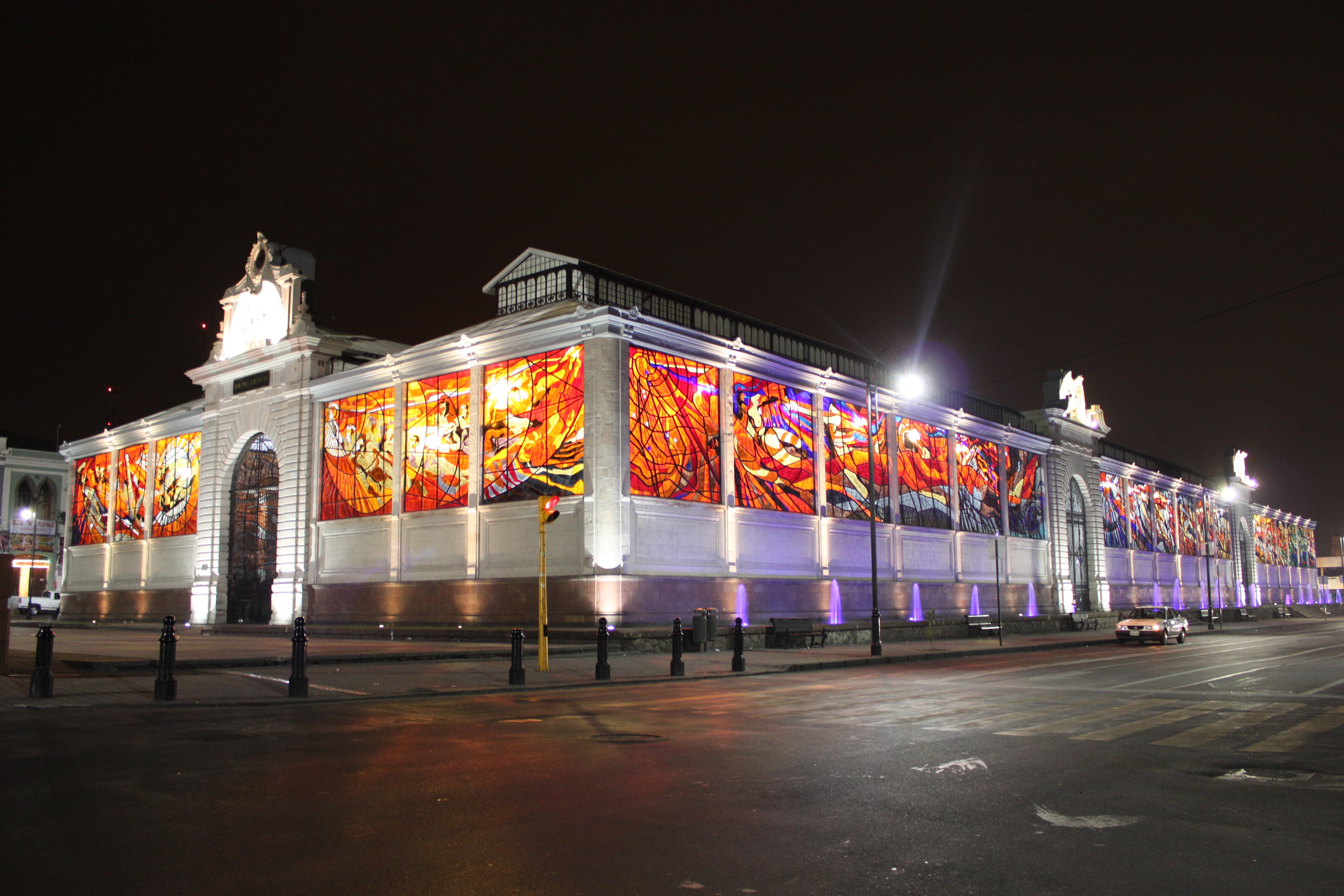
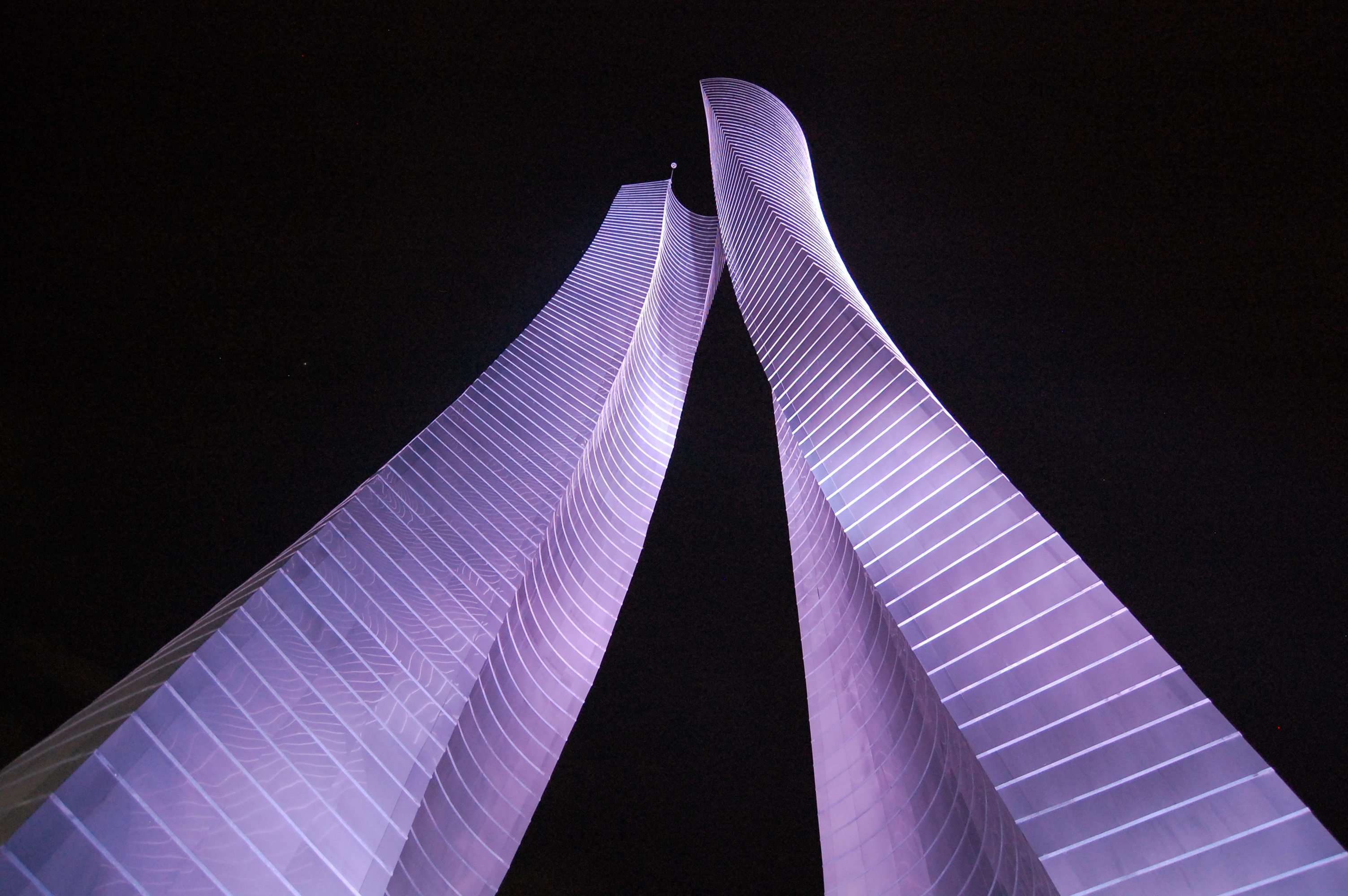

- Flag Coat of arms

- Location of Toluca Municipality in the State of Mexico

- Location within Mexico
- Coordinates: 19°17′33″N 99°39′25″W
- Country: Mexico
- State: Mexico
- Metro area: Greater Toluca
- Region: Toluca Region
- Municipal status: 13 December 1812
- Seat: Toluca de Lerdo

Government
  - Type: Ayuntamiento
  - Municipal President: Ricardo Moreno Bastida

Area
  - City: 452.37 km^{2} (174.66 sq mi)
  - Water: 7.30 km^{2} (2.82 sq mi)
- Elevation (of seat): 2,660 m (8,730 ft)

Population (2020 census)
  - City: 223,876
  - Density: 494.90/km^{2} (1,281.8/sq mi)
  - Urban: 2,476,689
  - Metro: 2,353,924
  - Municipality: 910,608

GDP (PPP, constant 2015 values)
  - Year: 2023
  - Total (Metro area): $35.6 billion
  - Per capita: $13,600
- Time zone: UTC-6 (Central)
- Postal code (of seat): 50000
- Area code: 722 / 729
- Demonym: Toluqueño (a)
- Website: Official website (in Spanish)

Toluca (Spanish pronunciation: [toˈluka]), officially Toluca de Lerdo (pronounced [toˈluka ðe ˈleɾdo]), is a state capital and municipality in the State of Mexico. Toluca has a population of 223,876 as of the 2020 census. The city forms the core of the Greater Toluca metropolitan area, which with a combined population of 2,347,692 forms the fifth most populous metropolitan area in the country. Located 63 kilometres (39 mi) southwest of Mexico City, the city's rapid growth stems largely from its proximity to the capital.

It is mainly an industrial city that borders Metepec, one of the richest municipalities in the country. The Toluca Valley has a good level of infrastructure. Its airport is considered the first option to relieve Mexico City and the first stage of the "El Insurgente" interurban train will soon come into operation, later with a maximum speed of 160 kilometers per hour and a length of 58 km it will link Toluca with Mexico City. It is connected 66 kilometers to the east with the Valley of Mexico, made up of Mexico City and its metropolitan area.

Thanks to citizen pressure over the last decade, urban cycling is promoted and the agreement signed with the United Nations Organization for the use and respect of the bicycle as a sustainable means of mass transportation. Its tourist attractions are several due to the great cultural and artistic heritage that has managed to keep alive the union of Hispanic and indigenous culture. Its traditional portals, the Cosmovitral botanical garden and multiple parks, museums, centers and cultural events stand out, among which the Alfeñique Fair stands out, on the occasion of the annual Day of the Dead festival, and the Toluca International Film Festival.

Toluca is located at 2,600 m (8,500 ft) above sea level, being the highest capital city in Mexico and North America, which makes it temperate throughout the year with average temperatures ranging between 6 and 25 degrees Celsius during spring and summer, and from −5 to 20 degrees Celsius in winter. Its climate is temperate subhumid with rain in summer. Its altitude favors the practice of high-performance sports, but as it is one of the most polluted cities in the country due to the emissions of its industrial corridor and the poor motorized public transportation of the last 3 years, outdoor exercise carries some risks for health.

== Etymology ==
Glyph of Tollocan

When Toluca was founded by the Matlatzincas, its original name was Nepintahihui (land of corn). The current name is based on the Náhuatl name for the area when it was renamed by the Aztecs in 1473. The name has its origin in the word tollocan that comes from the name of the god, Tolo, plus the locative suffix, can, to denote "place of Tolo". It is also referred to in a number of Aztec codices as Tolutépetl, meaning hill of the god, Tolo, an allusion to the nearby volcano. The name Toluca de Lerdo was adopted in 1861 in honor of President Sebastián Lerdo de Tejada.

The Otomi name for Toluca is Ncɨhni.

== History ==
=== Pre-Columbian era ===
The Valley of Toluca was known as Matlatzinco Valley in ancient times and home to at least four linguistic groups: the Matlatzinca, Otomi, Mazahua, and Nahua peoples. In the Postclassic period, the valley was ruled by a large powerful capital city whose ruins are located today in the village of Calixtlahuaca, just north of the city of Toluca. In 1478 the Mexica emperor Axayacatl conquered the Toluca Valley. The capital was stripped of its dynasty and power and some lands were distributed to kings and nobles from the Valley of Mexico. However, there was a local lord named Cachimatzin or Chimaltecuhtli who collaborated with the Aztecs and retained an influential position. Toluca warred against Tuzantla in the rival Purépecha Empire.

One of the rivals of Calixtlahuaca was Tollocan, a minor city-state before 1478. When Axayacatl destroyed Calixtlahuaca, he placed the imperial provincial capital in Tollocan. Calixtlahuaca and other towns in the Toluca Valley paid tribute to the Aztec Empire through Tollocan, which consisted of warrior costumes, mantas of cotton and maguey, and foodstuffs (particularly large amounts of maize). After the Spanish conquest, the name Tollocan was changed to Toluca. Archaeologists have not yet located a major Postclassic settlement within the modern city. Either the pre-Hispanic city of Tollocan was destroyed and covered over by the expansion of Toluca, or else the remains of Tollocan could lie outside of the modern city. A small Postclassic site was discovered on the hill called Tolochi, which is in the north of the modern city, but the remains seem too insubstantial to have been a major provincial capital. The tree of "Las Manitas Rojas", which literally means "little red hands", was planted before the Spanish Conquest in what is now the monastery of Nuestra Señora del Carmen. This tree is significant because it shows that Toluca was important enough for the Aztecs to create a botanical garden.

=== Colonial period ===
In 1521, the Spanish conquered the Valley of Toluca. Leading the troops was Gonzalo de Sandoval, one of Cortes' many sergeants. Toluca's first governor was Pedro Cortés Coyotzin. The Valley of Toluca and what is now the city of Toluca were included in the concession made by King Carlos V of Spain to Hernán Cortés.

In 1524, the evangelization process started in Toluca. The most notable figure of this effort is Fray Andrés Castro, from Burgos, the old capital of Castile, by making a great number of improvements to the city and being the first one to learn the native Matlatzincan language. The friar was well loved by the Matlazinca people, as he worked to protect them from the injustices of the early colonial period. He is remembered to this day with a plaza that bears his name which includes a sculpture depicting him. A Spanish community was established in 1530, but it was not until 1677 that Toluca was categorized as a town. In 1793, the construction of a road to Mexico City was started. Although Toluca was recognized as a city as early as 1662, only in 1799, was Toluca officially named a city by the King Carlos IV of Spain on September 12.

=== Independence and post-independence ===
In 1810, at the beginning of the independence movement, Miguel Hidalgo stayed in Toluca for a few days on his way to the Battle of Monte de las Cruces. In 1811, a group of indigenous natives of Mexico was shot and killed by Spanish royalists. In memorial to those who were killed in this incident, the place where this occurred was named "Plaza of the Martires". In 1812, the first city council of Toluca was installed. In 1821, independence was proclaimed by the local authorities.

After the creation of the State of Mexico in 1825, the state capital moved to different cities several times. In 1830, Toluca was designated as the constitutional capital of the State of Mexico. In 1832, the building of "Los Portales" was started in downtown Toluca. In 1836, because of the centralization of the Mexican federal government, all branches of government were relocated to Mexico City after some were in Toluca for several years.

In 1847, thanks to Ignacio Ramírez, "El Nigromante" or the Institute of Literature opened. In 1851, the "Teatro Principal" was built by González Arratia. Mariano Riva Palacio was named governor of the state and he started the most important modernization process of the city in the 19th century. In 1881, The Industrial Union was founded, the railroad was opened and the Bank of State of Mexico created the first bills in the country. In 1882, the Teachers College was founded. In 1910, people celebrated a century of Independence, and the Plaza España was inaugurated.

== Geography ==
The municipality of Toluca, which has a geographical extent of 420.14 km^{2} (162.2 sq mi), includes numerous communities other than Toluca de Lerdo, the largest of which are the municipalities of San Pablo Autopan and San José Guadalupe Otzacatipan. The municipality is bordered by the municipalities of Almoloya de Juárez, Temoaya, Otzolotepec, Xonacatlán, Lerma, San Mateo Atenco, Metepec, Calimaya, Tenango del Valle, Villa Guerrero and Zinacantepec.

The Lerma River flows from Lake Almoloya del Río through the center of the municipality towards the west, flowing into Lake Chapala. From this point westward the river takes the name of Río Grande de Santiago. And it goes from this lake to the Pacific Ocean in the state of Nayarit. The river is about 1,180 km (730 mi) long; about 60% of it is known as Lerma River and 40% as Santiago River. The Nevado de Toluca or Xinantécatl is 30 km (19 mi) southwest of the city. The god Tolo was supposed to reside in the volcano's crater. Its original indigenous name was Chignahualtecatl which means "Nine Mountains" but later was named Xinantecatl which means "naked man", because the silhouette of its crater resembles a sleeping man, before the Spaniards named it Nevado, meaning "snow-covered". It is a place of increasing sporting activity, such as mountain biking, climbing, and high altitude running. It is the only volcano in Mexico that has two lagoons and can be reached by automobile. There have been proposals to turn this mountain into a ski hill because of its accessibility and the low temperatures that exist on the mountain throughout the year, but recent reports on global warming have raised fears that the snow cap on the mountain will disappear completely within a few decades. The area was converted into the Nevado de Toluca National Park in January 1936 with about 1,517 km^{2} (585.7 sq mi) in area. The park has forest land, especially of pines and obeto trees. The prevalent animals are camp rats, teporingos, squirrels, tlacuaches, lizards, snakes, and eagles. On the lower part of this mountain there are picnic tables and BBQ grills. In the higher part of the volcano (inside) there are two lagoons in which visitors can practice scuba-diving and fishing. This volcano is unique in Mexico in that one can enter the crater by car.

Sierra Morelos Park is about 3 kilometres (1.9 mi) away from the center of Toluca. This is a reforested area with a small artificial lake, a picnic area and playground.

=== Climate ===
Under the Köppen climate classification, Toluca features a subtropical highland climate (Cwb), with relatively cool, dry winters, and mild, wet, humid summers. Freezing temperatures are common during winter. Toluca's climate is the coolest of any large Mexican city due to its altitude (2,680 metres or 8,790 feet above sea level). Winter nights are cold and the temperature may drop below 0 °C or 32 °F. Throughout the year, the temperature is rarely below −3 °C (26.6 °F) or above 27 °C (80.6 °F).

The climate is prone to extended dry periods particularly in the winter. Almost nine-tenths of the annual rainfall occurs between June and September. Just outside the heavily industrialized city, the municipality has forests with oak, pine, fir, cedar, cypress and other flora, characteristic of the temperate zone of central Mexico.

Although frost is common during winter due to the city's high elevation, snowfall in the urban area of Toluca is extremely rare. The last officially recorded snowfall in the city occurred on 10 January 1967, when an exceptional winter storm brought snow accumulation to parts of Toluca. The event was part of a broader cold-weather episode that also affected Mexico City and other areas of central Mexico.

Climate data for Toluca (1991–2020 normals, extremes since 1951)
Month	Jan	Feb	Mar	Apr	May	Jun	Jul	Aug	Sep	Oct	Nov	Dec	Year
Record high °C (°F)	27.0 (80.6)	30.0 (86.0)	32.5 (90.5)	32.0 (89.6)	33.6 (92.5)	31.0 (87.8)	27.0 (80.6)	26.5 (79.7)	27.5 (81.5)	28.5 (83.3)	26.8 (80.2)	31.0 (87.8)	33.6 (92.5)
Mean maximum °C (°F)	24.6 (76.3)	26.4 (79.5)	28.2 (82.8)	28.7 (83.7)	28.8 (83.8)	27.1 (80.8)	24.7 (76.5)	24.8 (76.6)	24.7 (76.5)	25.1 (77.2)	24.7 (76.5)	24.4 (75.9)	29.7 (85.5)
Mean daily maximum °C (°F)	20.3 (68.5)	22.3 (72.1)	23.9 (75.0)	25.0 (77.0)	24.8 (76.6)	22.9 (73.2)	21.7 (71.1)	21.8 (71.2)	21.5 (70.7)	21.7 (71.1)	21.2 (70.2)	20.3 (68.5)	22.3 (72.1)
Daily mean °C (°F)	10.0 (50.0)	11.5 (52.7)	13.1 (55.6)	14.8 (58.6)	15.7 (60.3)	15.6 (60.1)	15.3 (59.5)	15.0 (59.0)	14.4 (57.9)	13.7 (56.7)	11.6 (52.9)	10.2 (50.4)	13.4 (56.1)
Mean daily minimum °C (°F)	−0.4 (31.3)	0.7 (33.3)	2.3 (36.1)	4.5 (40.1)	6.5 (43.7)	8.2 (46.8)	8.8 (47.8)	8.2 (46.8)	8.3 (46.9)	5.6 (42.1)	2.0 (35.6)	0.1 (32.2)	4.6 (40.2)
Mean minimum °C (°F)	−4.5 (23.9)	−2.9 (26.8)	−1.8 (28.8)	−1.3 (29.7)	2.9 (37.2)	4.4 (39.9)	4.9 (40.8)	4.6 (40.3)	3.7 (38.7)	1.1 (34.0)	−2.7 (27.1)	−4.0 (24.8)	−5.2 (22.6)
Record low °C (°F)	−8.3 (17.1)	−7.0 (19.4)	−7.3 (18.9)	−1.8 (28.8)	0.5 (32.9)	3.0 (37.4)	0.8 (33.4)	2.4 (36.3)	−0.9 (30.4)	−3.1 (26.4)	−7.0 (19.4)	−9.7 (14.5)	−9.7 (14.5)
Average rainfall mm (inches)	10.9 (0.43)	14.6 (0.57)	19.9 (0.78)	33.8 (1.33)	87.2 (3.43)	172.8 (6.80)	198.5 (7.81)	185.9 (7.32)	163.5 (6.44)	65.0 (2.56)	20.6 (0.81)	8.0 (0.31)	980.7 (38.59)
Average rainy days (≥ 0.1 mm)	2.8	3.0	4.6	7.5	15.4	20.9	24.2	23.3	20.4	12.0	5.1	2.1	141.3
Average relative humidity (%)	64	61	58	56	60	68	71	72	72	70	67	65	65
Mean monthly sunshine hours	244	246	275	258	235	169	183	187	163	207	215	246	2,628
Source 1: Servicio Meteorológico Nacional (humidity 1951–2010 & extremes)
Source 2: NOAA Infoclimat (mean max/min 2000–2020, extremes recorded since 2000)

== Demographics ==
According to the 2020 census conducted by INEGI, the municipality of Toluca had a total population of 910,608 inhabitants, making it the third most populous municipality in the State of Mexico, behind Ecatepec and Nezahualcóyotl. The Toluca Valley metropolitan area, composed of 15 municipalities, is the fifth-largest metropolitan area in Mexico.

Historical population of Toluca Municipality
Year	Pop.	±%
1900	50,390	—
1910	52,680	+4.5%
1921	53,164	+0.9%
1930	64,834	+22.0%
1940	75,422	+16.3%
1950	115,526	+53.2%
1960	171,265	+48.2%
1970	239,293	+39.7%
1980	357,071	+49.2%
1990	487,612	+36.6%
1995	564,455	+15.8%
2000	666,596	+18.1%
2005	747,512	+12.1%
2010	819,561	+9.6%
2015	873,536	+6.6%
2020	910,608	+4.2%

The municipality faces urban and social challenges due to its rapid expansion and industrial growth. Migration from other regions of Mexico, attracted by employment opportunities, has led to increased crime rates and social contrast, particularly in northern communities such as San Pablo Autopan and San Andrés Cuexcoltitlan. Concurrently, a Gender Violence Alert (Alerta de Violencia de Género contra las Mujeres) was declared for the municipality due to high rates of violence against women.

=== Indigenous groups ===
Approximately 2.6% of the population over the age of five speaks an indigenous language. The most widely spoken indigenous language in the municipality is Otomi, followed by Mazahua and Nahuatl.

Indigenous languages spoken in Toluca Municipality
Language	Speakers (2005)
Otomi	16,191
Mazahua	557
Nahuatl	327
Zapotec	99
Unspecified	1,198
Total	18,816

=== Historical immigration ===
During the late 19th and early 20th centuries, the demographic composition of Toluca de Lerdo was significantly influenced by the arrival of various foreign communities, mainly of German, French, and Lebanese origin. These immigrant groups integrated into the local society and revitalized the city's economy. The German community drove the brewing and manufacturing industries, while French and Lebanese immigrants primarily established themselves in the commercial sector of the city center. This migration left a lasting impact on the architecture, gastronomy, and cultural identity of the municipality.

In contemporary times, Toluca continues to be a relevant destination for international migration within the State of Mexico. According to data from the INEGI Population and Housing Census, Toluca ranked fifth in the state for its concentration of foreign-born residents, recording a total of 3,463 international inhabitants. At the state level, the primary countries of origin for the foreign community are the United States, Colombia, and Venezuela.

At the state level, Toluca is part of a regional trend that hosts more than 65,000 foreign residents, primarily concentrated in the metropolitan area and neighboring municipalities such as Huixquilucan, Naucalpan, and Metepec. The demographic profile of this population within the state is equally distributed between men and women, with the majority falling into the 20-to-39 age range. Furthermore, the main causes for relocation are family reasons (72.5%), employment and business opportunities (9.9%), and educational purposes (4.3%).

=== Identity and urban perception ===
Historically nicknamed "The Little France" (La Pequeña Francia) and "Toluca the Beautiful" (Toluca la Bella) due to its French-influenced colonial and neoclassical architecture, modern Toluca has transitioned into a highly industrialized and administrative cosmopolitan hub. Due to its close proximity to Mexico City, it maintains a strict functional relationship with the capital, including large daily commuter flows for work and education. Distinctive features of the city's regional identity include its famously cold climate relative to other central Mexican cities, as well as major cultural landmarks like the Cosmovitral and the adjacent Nevado de Toluca volcano.

=== Religion ===
According to the 2020 Population and Housing Census conducted by the National Institute of Statistics and Geography (INEGI), Christianity is the predominant religion in the municipality of Toluca. Roman Catholicism remains the largest denomination, adhered to by 78.5% of the population. However, local surveys and census trends show a gradual decline in active Catholic practice within the urban center, where secularization has become more pronounced among younger demographics. Catholic traditions still maintain a strong cultural presence, highlighted by the annual pilgrimage from the Cathedral of Toluca to the Basilica of Our Lady of Guadalupe in Mexico City, which draws tens of thousands of local participants every year.

Religion in Toluca (2020 INEGI Census)
Religion	Percent
Roman Catholicism	78.5%
Protestant and Evangelical	10.2%
No religion	7.1%
No religious affiliation	3.8%
Other religions	0.4%

Protestant and Evangelical communities represent the second-largest religious group, accounting for 10.2% of the inhabitants. This growth is particularly notable in the northern semi-urban delegations of the municipality, such as San Cristóbal Huichochitlán and San Andrés Cuexcontitlán, which have significant Otomi indigenous populations. In these areas, several evangelical congregations have adapted their services and biblical translations into the Otomi language.

Those identifying as irreligious—including atheists, agnostics, and those with no specific religious affiliation—make up nearly 11% of the population, reflecting a growing nationwide trend toward religious disaffiliation in major Mexican urban areas. Other minority religious groups, including The Church of Jesus Christ of Latter-day Saints, Jehovah's Witnesses, and small Jewish and Eastern religious communities, collectively account for less than 1% of the total population.

== Economy ==
In colonial times, Toluca first gained economic importance as a producer of smoked and cured meats, especially chorizo sausage. The nearby town of Lerma still carries on this tradition. However, since that time, Toluca's economy has expanded far beyond sausage to become one of the most industrialized areas in Mexico. Its geographic position in the center of the country and proximity to Mexico City as well as its well-developed infrastructure, have allowed Toluca to grow into a major industrial zone for the state. Toluca began consolidating in the 1940s, but the most intense industrialization began in the 1950s and continued through most of the 1980s. The growth and industrialization of Toluca is closely tied to the growth and changes in economic activities that have occurred in the Mexico City metropolitan area. Most industrial enterprises are on the small and micro-level but the city has attracted a large number of international corporations. Major products produced include food processing, metals and machinery, paper products, printed matter as well as auto production. The industrial base of the Toluca metropolitan area employs over 33% of the municipality's population and 6% of the entire state's population.

Outside of the metropolitan area, the economy is still based on agriculture and livestock, with some income from tourism. Only a little over four percent of the total municipal population engages in agriculture raising corn, wheat, beans, potatoes, peas, fava beans and oats on a little over half of the municipality's territory. Livestock raising is a greater source of income with 10,286 sites producing cattle, pigs, sheep and domestic fowl. Tourism is based on the Nevado de Toluca volcano and the archeological zone of Calixtlahuaca. Despite being little known internationally, they manage to represent about 50% of the state's tourism income.

Toluca lies in the southern part of the valley and its economic influence is most strongly felt in the southern and central parts of the valley. The northern parts of the valley have closer ties to Atlacomulco. The core metropolitan area of Toluca consists of the municipalities of Toluca, Lerma, Metepec, San Mateo Atenco, Ocoyoacac and Zinacantepec. The economic interdependence of these municipalities are most similar to that of the communities in the Mexico City metropolitan area. There are two "outer spheres" of the metropolitan area. The first consists of the municipalities of Almoloya del Río, Capulhuac, Mexicaltzingo, San Antonio la Isla, Tenango del Valle and Xonacatlán. The furthest sphere consists of Santiago Tianguistenco, Santa María Rayón, Santa Cruz Atizapán and Chapultepec, México. These spheres are defined not only by geographical distance but also by population growth and rate of urbanization.

=== Industrial zone ===
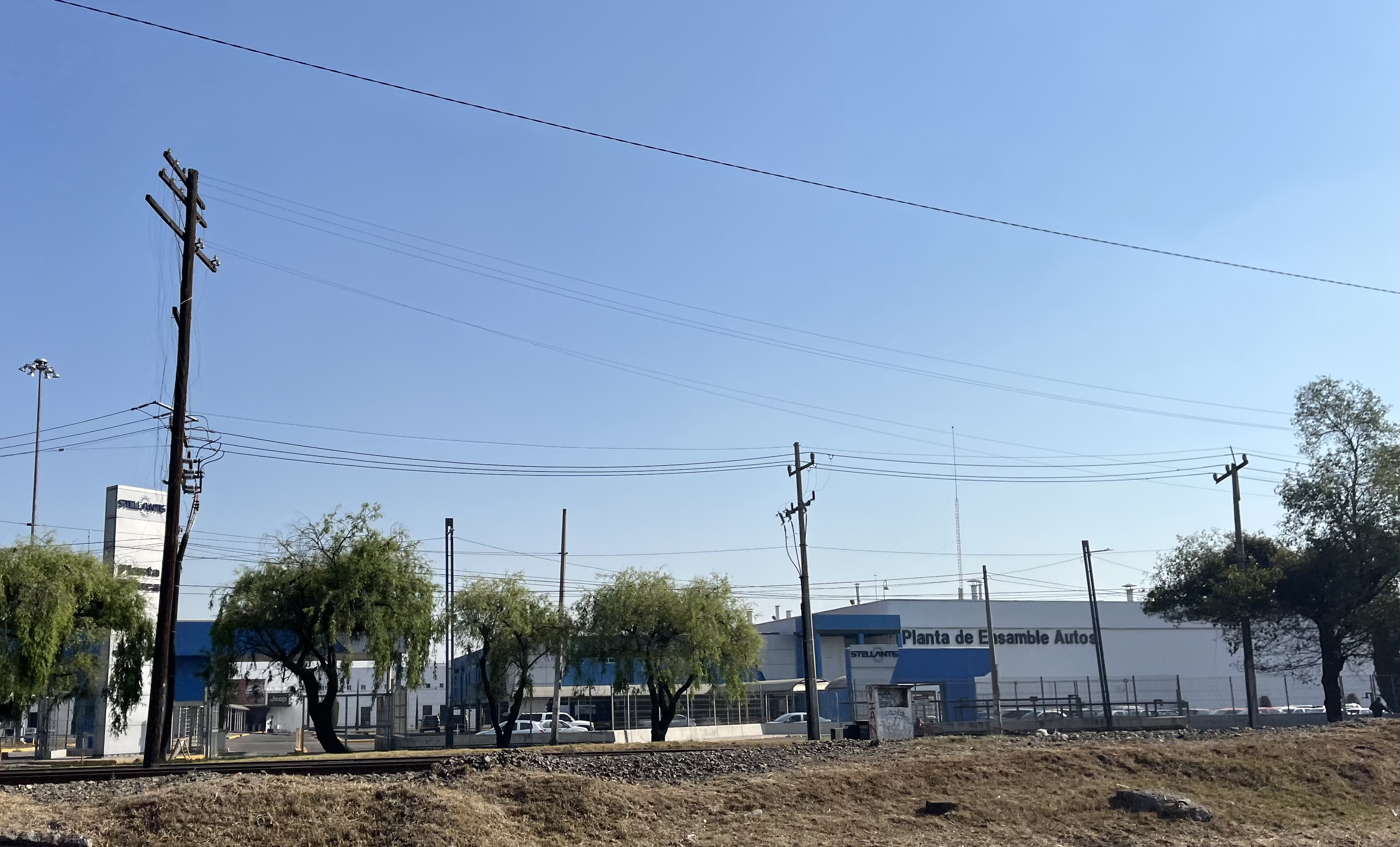
Toluca Car Assembly

Toluca is located in the economic center of Mexico. Toluca has become an important economic city because of its industries and infrastructure that produce drinks, food, textiles, cars, electric products and such. Since 1944, many industries have settled in Toluca rather than in other cities. In 1965, the industrial zone of Toluca-Lerma-Tianguistenco, which is located on the north side of Toluca, began to attract industries to the area. The city now has five additional major industrial parks: Corredor Industrial Toluca, Parque Industrial Lerma, Parque Industrial Exportec I., Parque Industrial Exportec II and the Parque Industrial El Coecillo.

Chrysler's Toluca Car Assembly has manufactured automobiles since 1968. The 220-acre (0.89 km^{2}) complex employs 2300 people. Other companies located here or that have industrial parks in Toluca are BMW, Mercedes-Benz, Coca-Cola, Femsa, Grupo Bimbo, Nissan, Nestlé, Pfizer, Bayer, CRISA, Barcel, Knorr, Trelleborg Automotive, and HSBC. Many of those aforementioned companies have complete manufacturing and R&D facilities in the Toluca industrial park. Mercedes-Benz manufactures the C-Class, E-Class, G-Class, here and upgrades the GL-Class, S-Class and CLS-Class to armored vehicles at this facility. BMW manufactures its 3, 5, 7 and X5 series and also offers armored variants.

== Transportation ==
=== Road ===
Mexican Federal Highway 15 to Mexico City

Toluca has an infrastructure of highways that connect the city with the main cities of the country as well as its international Airport, and inter-city bus Station.

The Libramiento (bypass) Toluca is a project to directly connect the Toluca-Mexico City highway to the east of the city to the Toluca-Atlacomulco highway the extends north. It will permit easier access to the airport as well as a bypass route for traffic heading from Mexico City to the west and northwest. The libramiento is already complete, but it is not used by many people because of the high tolls.

The highways that connect Toluca with Mexico City and Guadalajara are being expanded and modernized due to the "Mexiquese Outer Loop" (Circuito Exterior Mexiquense) project, which aims to improve major highways leading from Mexico City to the rest of the country. One proposed highway, called Autopista Lerma – Tres Marías y Ramal Tenango (Lerma – Tres Marías and Tenango branch highway), aims to improve transit between Toluca and Cuernavaca, as well as other cities to the south. Currently, almost all major roadways serving Toluca transit in the north. It will allow transit from Toluca to southern and eastern destinations bypassing Mexico City but connecting the city with the Mexico City–Cuernavaca highway. However, the project is opposed by Greenpeace Mexico as well as a number of local groups, primarily due to the possible damage it can cause to the "Great Water Forest" "Gran Bosque del Agua" forest, which contains an important aquifer for the Toluca, Cuernavaca and Mexico City metropolitan areas. There are also concerns that the highway will extend development into small towns that do not want it.

=== Rail ===
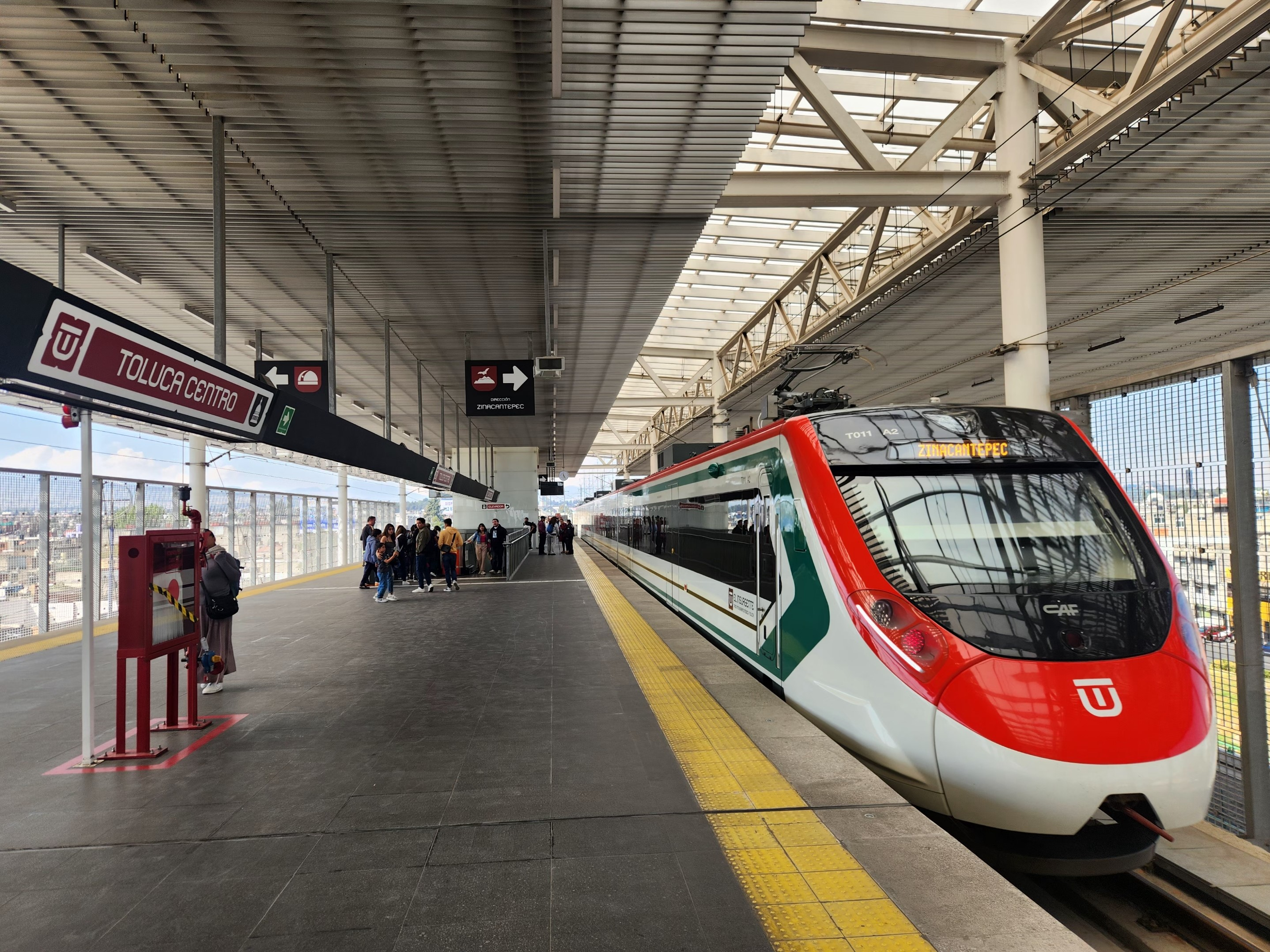
Tren El Insurgente at Toluca Centro station

A commuter rail line known as "El Insurgente" ("The Insurgent") will connect Toluca to Mexico City. As of October 2020, it was estimated to open in 2023. The first section, spanning from Zincatepec to Lerna, opened on 15 September 2023.

The complete 57.7-kilometer (35.9 mi) line became fully operational on 2 February 2026, extending service from Lerma through the Sierra de las Cruces tunnel to the Observatorio transport hub in western Mexico City, where it connects with Metro Line 1. The electric trains operate at speeds up to 120 km/h (75 mph), reducing travel times between the Toluca Valley and Mexico City to approximately 40–50 minutes. Within the Toluca metropolitan area, the system serves four stations: Zinacantepec, Toluca Centro, Metepec, and Lerma.

=== Airport ===
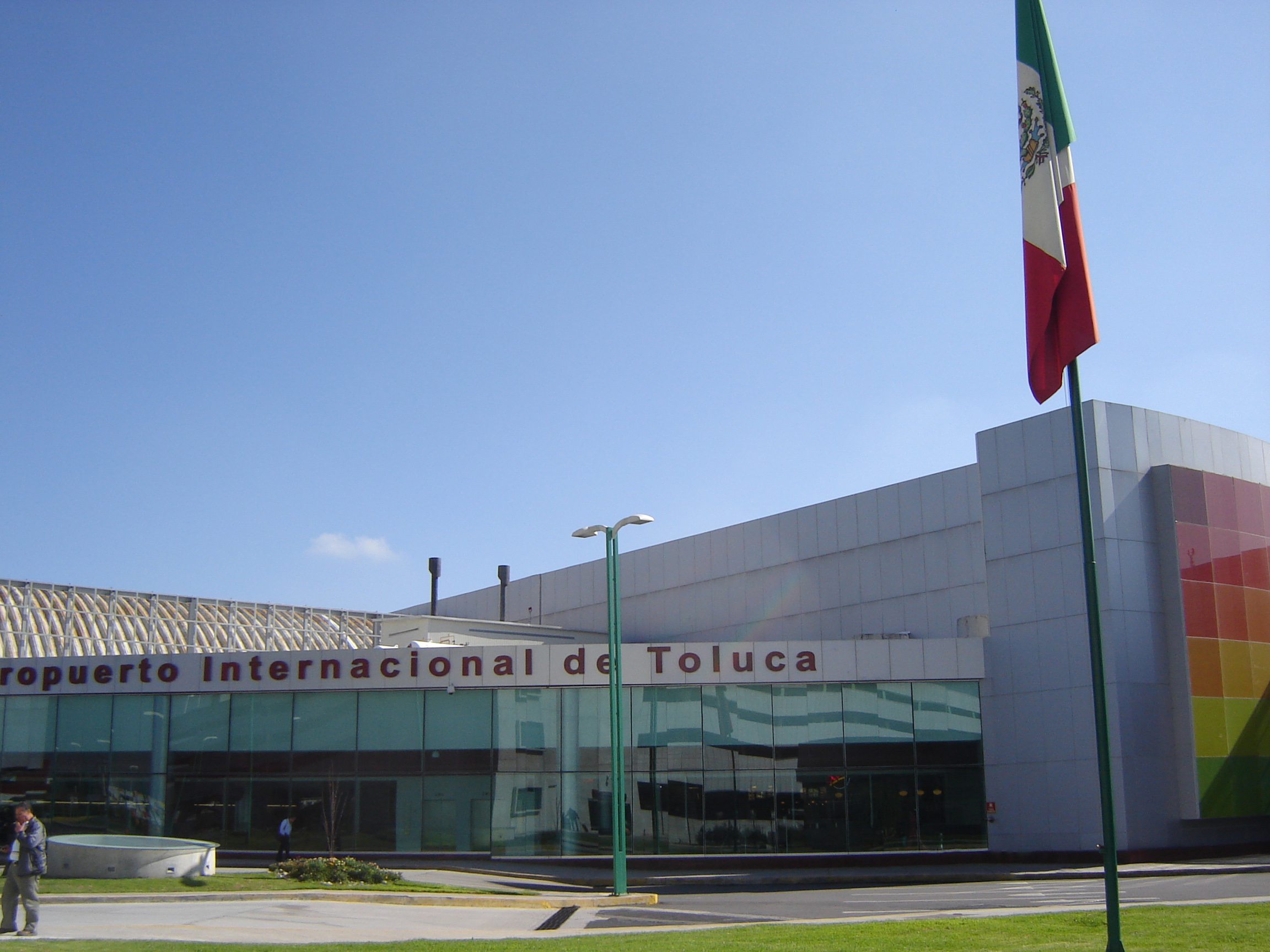
Licenciado Adolfo López Mateos International Airport

Toluca is served by Licenciado Adolfo López Mateos International Airport. The airport has a 4,200-metre (13,800-foot) runway and is located 15 kilometres (9 miles) from Toluca and 60 kilometres (37 miles) from the country's capital, thus serving as an overflow airport for Mexico City. This airport has started a development initiative of the Federal and State Governments, as well as the private sector, which provided an investment of almost 3,200 million U.S. dollars in the last 2 years.

This airport has created 4,500 jobs and has contributed to the increase of commercial activity for the metropolitan area. It has also attracted many airline passengers who live in Mexico City to use the Toluca airport, which represents migration in potential consumers of 2.2 million passengers in 2007 and it is projected that for 2008 up to five millions travelers may use the Toluca Airport, which would make it the 4th busiest in the country.

=== Bike sharing ===
Toluca's Huizi public bike share system was launched in 2015 with 27 stations and 350 bicycles. The system is operated by PBSC Urban Solutions.

== Government ==
The municipality of Toluca is governed by a municipal council (Ayuntamiento), which consists of a municipal president (mayor), three syndics (síndicos), and 16 councilors (regidores). The municipal government is elected for a three-year term.

=== Municipal presidents ===
The following is a list of municipal presidents (mayors) of Toluca since 1940:

Municipal president	Term	Political party	Notes
Gustavo Durán Vilchis	1940–1941	PRM	
Juan Fernández Albarrán	1942–1943	PRM	
Justo García	1943–1945	PRM	
Antero González Torrescano	1945–1948	PRM	
Felipe Chávez Becerril	1948–1951	PRI	
Antonio Vilchis Hernández	1951–1954	PRI	
Carlos Hank González	1954–1957	PRI	
Felipe Chávez Becerril	1957–1960	PRI	
Aurelio Zúñiga Najera	1960–1963	PRI	
Jaime Pons Hernández	1963–1966	PRI	
Felipe Chávez Becerril	1966–1969	PRI	
Alfonso Gómez de Orozco	1969–1972	PRI	
Arturo Martínez Legorreta	1972–1975	PRI	
Yolanda Sentíes de Ballesteros	1975–1978	PRI	First female mayor
José Antonio Muñoz Samayoa	1978–1981	PRI	
Víctor Quiroz Santibáñez	1981	PRI	
Emilio Chuayffet	1981–1984	PRI	
Agustín Gasca Pliego	1984–1987	PRI	
Laura Pavón Jaramillo	1987–1990	PRI	
Enrique González Isunza	1990–1993	PRI	
Ramón Arana Pozos	1993	PRI	
Alejandro Ozuna Rivero	1993–1996	PRI	
Armando Garduño Pérez	1996–2000	PRI	
Juan Carlos Núñez Armas	2000–2003	PAN	
Armando Enríquez Flores	2003–2006	PAN	
Juan Rodolfo Sánchez Gómez	2006–2009	PAN	
María Elena Barrera Tapia	2009–2012	PRI	Coalitions: PVEM, New Alliance
Guillermo Legorreta Martínez	2012	PRI	Substitute mayor
Martha Hilda González Calderón	2013–2015	PRI	Coalitions: PVEM, New Alliance
Braulio Antonio Álvarez Jasso	2015	PRI	Substitute mayor
Fernando Zamora Morales	2016–2018	PRI	Coalitions: PVEM, New Alliance
Juan Rodolfo Sánchez Gómez	2019–2021	Morena	Coalitions: PT, PES
Sandro Andías Mejía Sanabria	2021	Morena	Substitute mayor
Raymundo Martínez Carbajal	2022–2023	PRI	Coalitions: PAN, PRD
Juan Maccise Naime	2023–2024	PRI	Substitute mayor
Ricardo Moreno Bastida	2025–2027	Morena	

== Education ==
Since Toluca is the capital of the State of Mexico, there are several diverse and important educational centers such as the state-funded public university, the Universidad Autónoma del Estado de México (UAEM). Also, it is home to major private universities, including campuses of the Universidad Tecnológica de México (UNITEC), Tecnológico de Monterrey (ITESM), and the Universidad del Valle de México. There are currently 574 schools in Toluca, with about 8,320 teachers. The illiteracy rate is 7.33%, which is considered high.

UAEM, the state's public university, has its roots in the Literary Institute, later named the Scientific and Literary Institute, which was founded in 1828. It has been a prestigious institution and educated figures such as José María Heredia, Ignacio Ramírez, Felipe Sánchez Solís, Ignacio Manuel Altamirano and Adolfo López Mateos. The Institute became an autonomous university in 1956. The original building, situated downtown near Benito Juárez street, has been remodeled and houses the dean's offices. The university has installations in various parts of the city, but the most noticeable is "Ciudad Universitaria" (lit. 'university city'), a campus built around the hill Cerro de Coatepec. A monumental bust of Adolfo López Mateos, alumnus and former president of Mexico (1958–1964), is displayed at the top of the hill.

=== Primary and secondary schools ===
Private schools in Toluca include:

- Instituto Simón Bolívar Toluca

== Landmarks ==
Zocalo of Toluca

The center of the town is the Zócalo, also known as Plaza de los Mártires ("Plaza of the Martyrs"), which includes buildings such as the Palace of the State Government and the Justice Palace (Palacio de Justicia). The square is named after events that took place after the Battle of Tenango Hill during the Mexican War of Independence. Insurgent commander José Maria Oviedo was faced with the royalist army of Rosendo Porlier, who succeeded in driving the rebels northward to Toluca. Viceroy Venegas ordered reinforcements for Porlier's army and dispersed the insurgents, causing them to lose artillery and supplies. In addition, the royalist forces took over a hundred prisoners and executed them in the main square. The bodies of the prisoners were buried in a mass grave behind what is now the Municipal Palace. A temple was built over the spot after the end of the Revolution. A monument to Father Miguel Hidalgo, the "father" of the Mexican Revolution is in the center of the square. It was created in Florence by Rivalta in 1899. The pedestal has reliefs depicting the storming of the Alhóndiga de Granaditas and the Battle of Monte de las Cruces.

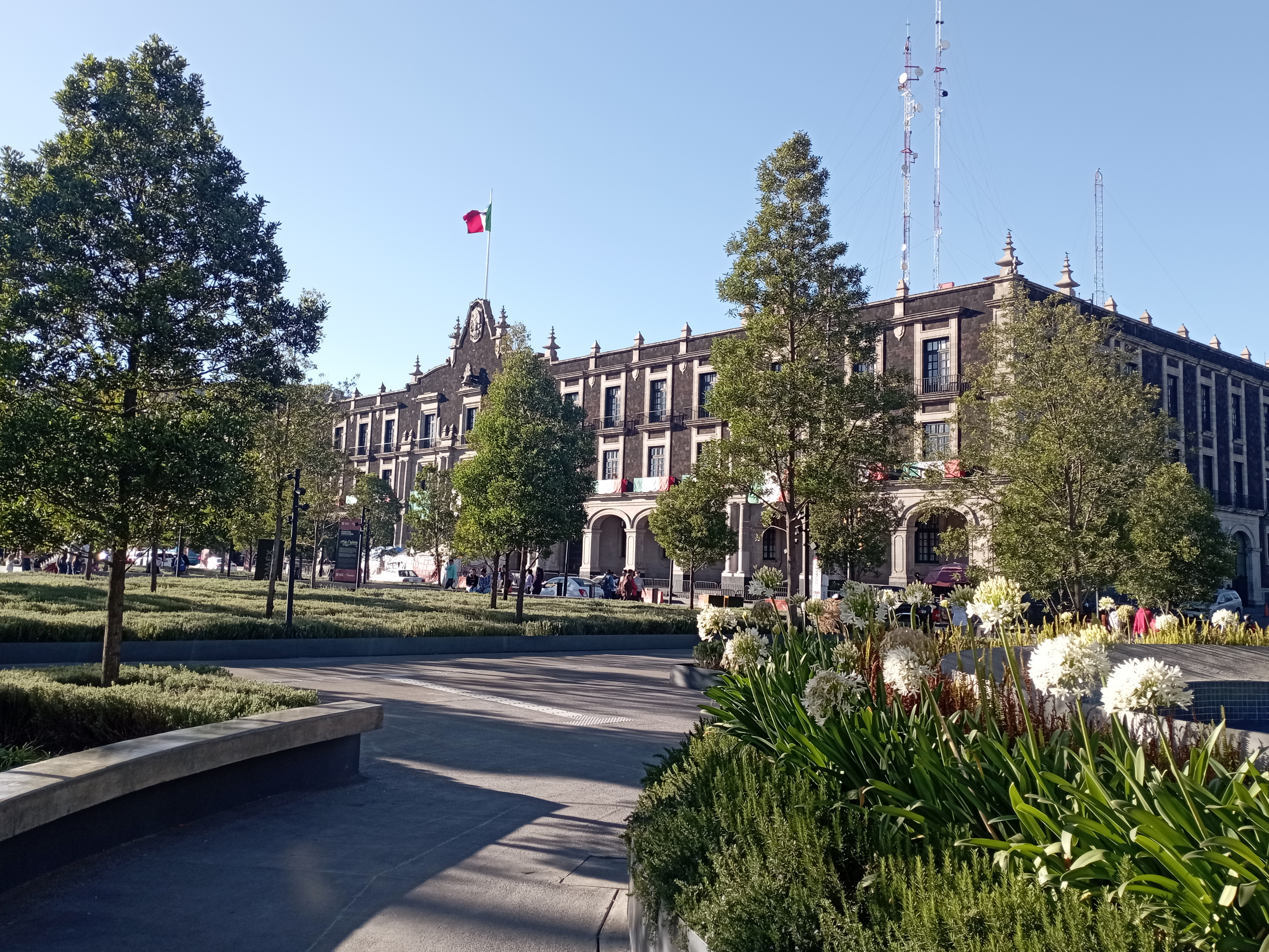
Government Palace of the State of Mexico

The central plaza is surrounded by state and municipal government buildings. The state government palace and the Chamber of Deputies are recent constructions, but the buildings housing the state court and the municipal palace date from the 19th century. The state court building originally was the home of the state government and was designed by Ramón Rodriguez Arangoiti, who also designed the imperial wing of the Chapultepec Castle. The municipal palace was completed in 1873 on land that once belonged to a Franciscan monastery. The Chamber of Deputies building contains murals done by Leopoldo Flores, which together are known as Construction: Images and Flight depicting man constructing buildings and himself at the same time. The municipal palace and the Chamber of Deputies are decorated with Neoclassic façades, but the other government buildings, built in the 1960s are faced with tezontle in the style of the 18th-century palaces in Mexico City.

Templo del Carmen

The Temple of La Merced is one of the most ancient convents still preserved and one of the most important founded by Spaniards. It is a beautiful building of a religious order called mercenarios, and it shows architectural styles from the 18th, 19th, and 20th centuries. Its principal façade has 3 naves and was constructed in the 18th century on the remains of the old Temple of San Francisco. The interior of the temple exhibits neoclassical style with gold-leaf. It features oil paintings from the aforementioned times, such as the "Birth of San Pedro Nolasco", founder of the Mercenarios order. The temple became a hospice for orphans and beggars. Baroque construction style can be seen in the pilasters, niches and the order's shield. Inside, you can see paintings of Felipe Gutierrez, a Mexican painter who graduated from the San Carlos Academy. It is located in downtown Toluca on Jose Ma. Morelos street.

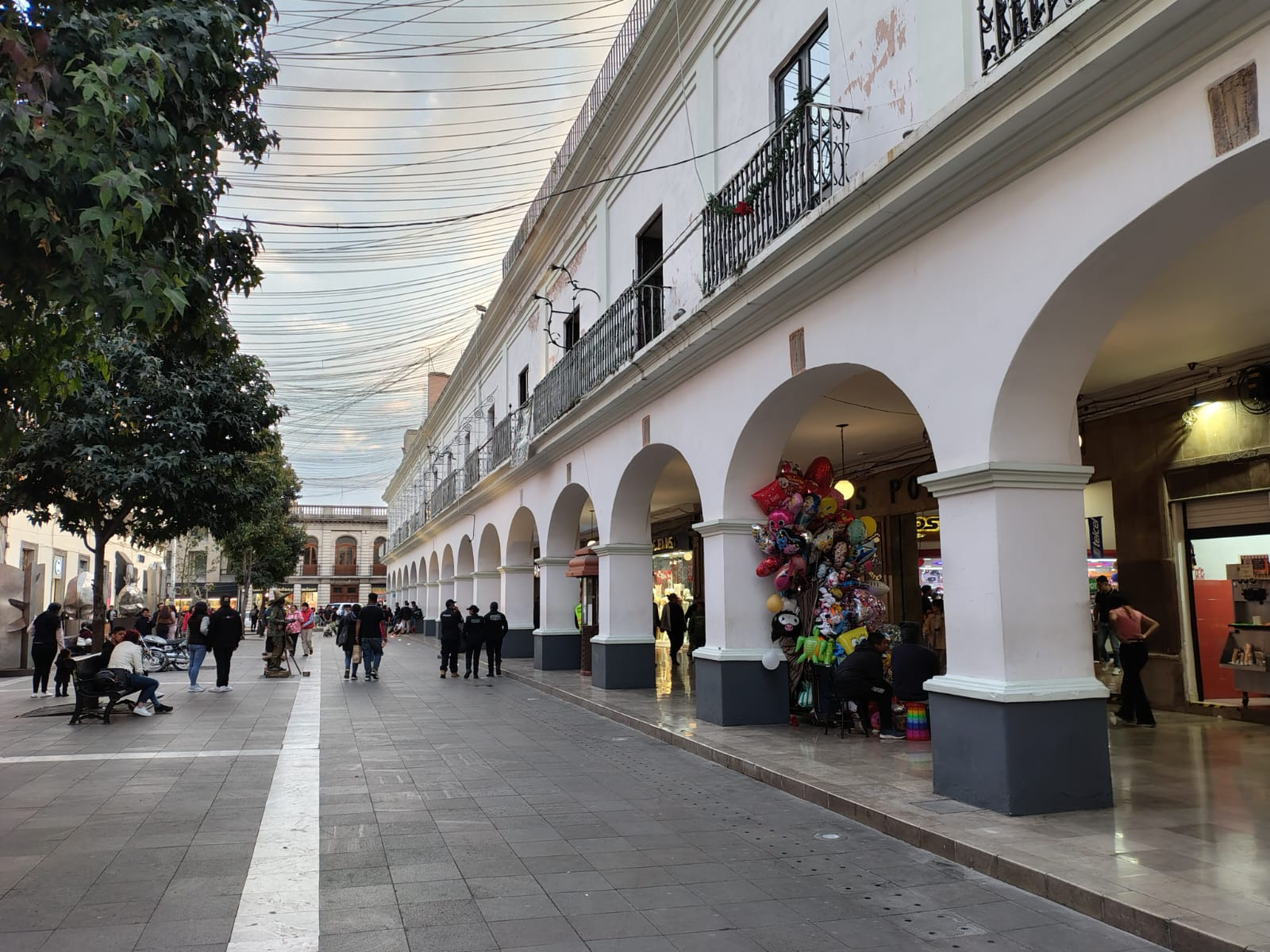
Los Portales

Los Portales represent the social and commercial life of the city. They are a composed of three sets of arches or portals that extend on the 3 sides of the city block that extends behind the main cathedral. Behind the sets of arches there is walking space that takes you around the stores that are contained within. The western arches follow the perimeter of what was the La Asunción Franciscan monastery. The eastern and southern arches were completed in 1836 by José María González Arratia. The original western arches were built by the Buenaventura Merlín. Each side consists of basket-handle arches, each with a balcony. Each side has its own name. The eastern one, with 37 arches, is called "20 de Noviembre" or "Constitución"; the southern one, with 44 arches, is called "Madero" and the western one, with 35 arches, is called "Reforma". There are four additional arches at the entrance to Avenida Independencia. Near Los Portales are some of the city's oldest businesses, some of which date from the 19th century such as the pharmacy on Calle Santos Degollado, a brass and iron workshop on Avenida Lerdo and a leather workshop on Avenida Juárez.

Templo de la Santa Veracruz

The Plaza de Fray Andrés de Castro is located next to Los Portales and connected to the older arches by means of a passageway with a transparent roof. It is a semi-enclosed space which was once the sacristy of the La Asunción Franciscan Monastery. The sacristy was built by Felipe de Ureña and José Rivera and is essentially a reproduction of the Santa María del Puerto hermitage in Madrid and is one of the few remaining buildings of the old monastery. The square in front was recently remodeled but still contains traditional stores selling garapiña, traditional candies, tacos and other regional foods. The Municipal Historic Archive is located above the passageway leading to Los Portales was begun in 1867 by José Francisco de Paula on land originally belonging to the Asunción de Toluca Franciscan monastery. The building was originally designed by Agustín Carrillo. However, in 1870, Ramon Rodriguez Arangoiti redesigned the cathedral, based on his experience with old Roman basilicas although the present-day building still contains a number of the elements of the original design such as the aisle that runs parallel to the façade serving as a narthex, allowing access to the central and two side naves. The straight central nave is lighted by round arched windows. The outside façade consists of two parts. The first has seven columned areas, as well as niches with the images of Saint John, Saint Thomas, Saint Peter and Saint James. The second part rises above the main doors with three columned areas containing balconies, stained-glass windows and balustrades, terminating in a rectilinear pediment with an image of the Ascension of the Lord. In this, the cathedral shares design elements with the Cathedral of Mexico City. Above this, there is a clock with sculptures depicting the Fathers of the Greek Orthodox Church, Saint John Chrisotomus, Saint Basil the Great, Saint Athanasius and Saint Gregory of Nyssa. The cathedral is topped by a dome with a bronze statue of Saint Joseph, who is the patron saint of the city, holding the infant Jesus. Overall the cathedral is a mix of styles, represents the various stages in which it was built and remodeled.

The Tercer Orden Temple is located to the side of the main cathedral. Its façade is integrated into the main cathedral's in the popular indigenous Baroque architecture of the 18th century. It was the seat of the bishopric until 1978, when it was moved to the main cathedral. The temple contains a number of paintings, including The Three Orders and The Family Tree of Saint Francis. The Cosmovitral is located in a stone and ironwork building in the center of Toluca, designed in 1910 by engineer Manuel Arratia to accommodate the "16 de Septiembre" market. It was constructed in Art Nouveau and Neoclassical style, with an area of 5,000 square metres (53,820 square feet). It is now a botanical garden with more than 400 species of plants from all over the world. It also features a series of stained glass windows that are considered the largest in the world. These windows were created and designed by a Mexican artist named Leopoldo Flores. Cosmovitral was inaugurated in 1980 and completed in 1990. The stained glass ceiling represents the Milky Way and joins the "Hombre Sol" (Sun Man) with the Galaxy of Andromeda. It is a monumental piece measuring 3,200 square metres (34,445 square feet) with more than 30 thousand pieces and half a million glass pieces of 28 different colors coming from many different parts of the world such as Italy, Germany, France, Belgium, Japan, Canada and the United States. It has a series of scenes that symbolize man's search of the light, the good and the wisdom to elevate his spirit to liberate him from the shadows of evil and the ignorance in an epic tale without beginning or end. At the spring equinox, the solar disc crosses the heart of "El hombre Sol" (the sun man), causing an explosion of light.

Toluca has a lot of green areas and among them is the Sierra Morelos park, this park is one of the largest in the city that covers 302 hectares is located on the slopes of Cerro de La Teresona and houses an important population of forests of pine, eucalyptus and oak.

The Santa Veracruz Temple is the home of a famous image of "Our Lord of the Holy Cross" also known as a "Black Christ". This image was originally housed in the San Francisco Temple, but the increasing number of worshippers dictated the building of its own sanctuary. Construction began in 1753, but because of friction between the Franciscans and worshippers, it was not completed until 1797. Although the original plans included two towers, only one was built, containing two hexagonal bodies, pairs of columns and balconies with semicircular rails. Both bodies are topped with domes, each bearing a cross. The space that was reserved for the second tower instead has an ornate clock.

=== Museums ===
Museo de Bellas Artes

Toluca, being the capital of the State of Mexico, is home of several important museums. It is second only to Mexico City in number of museums. Some of them honor important Mexican artists such as José María Velasco Gómez, Felipe Santiago Gutiérrez, and Luis Nishizawa, among others.

These museums are the following:

- The Museo de Bellas Artes (Museum of Fine Arts) was founded in 1945 by the ex-governor Isidro Fabela. It is the oldest museum of Toluca. It displays art by José Juarez, Cristóbal de Villalpando, Miguel Cabrera, among others. It is housed in an 18th-century building that was once the "Descalced Carmelite Purísima Concepción" convent and built between 1697 and 1711. One of the most valuable pieces is a catafalque dating from the mid 18th century. Since these artifacts were almost always burned by Church authorities, this is an extremely rare piece.
- The Museo de Ciencias Naturales (Museum of Natural Sciences) has been located in Matlatzinca Park since 1971. It was found by the ex-governor Carlos Hank González. It presents expositions related to natural sciences. Also it holds Luis Camarena González's collections of butterflies, insects, mammals and crustaceans.
- The Museo de la Estampa (Print Museum) was dedicated in 1987 to graphic art. It displays lithographic, xylographic, chalcographic, serigraphic, offset and neographic art from Manuel Manilla, José Guadalupe Posada, Carlos Alvarado Lang, Alfredo Zalce, Rufino Tamayo, etc. It has seven display rooms and an embossing workshop.
- The Museo de la Acuarela (Watercolor Museum) was founded in 1993 and is one of the few museums in the world dedicated to watercolors. It has rooms dedicated to Mexican artists like Pastor Velázquez, Vicente Mendiola, Edgardo Coghlan, Ignacio Barrios and Ángel Mauro. It also has a Estado de México room with pieces which have won national prizes. It is located in a house that has always been known as "El Gallito" (Little Rooster), a name which appears in the crest of the main façade.
- The Museo de la Numismática (Numismatics Museum) was founded in 1987 by the state government to show Mexico's history through coins from the pre-Hispanic period up to the present day. It is one of a kind in Latin America. The collection of bills is very important because of its antiquity.
- The Museo José María Velasco (José María Velasco Museum) was founded in honor of one of the most famous landscape artists of the 19th century. It holds about 40 pieces from the artist as well as drawings and oil paintings. It has a library and a central patio where cultural events take place. The building was once occupied by Father Miguel Hidalgo before he fought in the Battle of Monte de las Cruces. Works on permanent display include: "The Volcanoes Seen from the Ocotlán Valley", "The Valley of Mexico from Molino del Rey" and "Self-Portrait".
- The Museo Felipe Santiago Gutiérrez (Felipe Santiago Gutiérrez Museum) also has a room of Mexican paintings from the 19th century. It has a collection of 225 oil paintings, watercolors and drawings which reflects Gutiérrez's evolution as an artist.
- The Museo-Taller Luis Nishizawa (Luis Nishizawa Workshop-Museum) was founded in honor of the artist in 1992. It has 7 halls and a library specializing in art and an information center. It is located in the old El Cóporo neighborhood, housed in one of Toluca's oldest mansions which is mentioned in numerous 17th century documents.
- The Centro Cultural Mexiquense contains three museums. The Museo de Arte Moderno (Museum of Modern Art) holds a great collection of Mexican paintings of the 20th and 21st centuries. The pieces come from other museums like Bellas Artes as well as from artist and institutional donations. Some of the artists represented are Gilberto Navarro, José Luis Cuevas, Siqueiros, Leopoldo Flores, etc. The Museo de Culturas Populares (Museum of Popular Cultures) displays a large collection of crafts, including items make of wood, bones, glass, seeds, as well as textiles, traditional toys and regional candy and other foods. The Museo de Antropología e Historia (Museum of Anthropology and History) has more than 1000 pieces on display, with an introductory room, five archeological rooms, seven ethnographic rooms and one historical room. Its theme is Mexico's place in the evolution of the hemisphere's history and geography, as well as the geopolitical and strategic importance of the State of Mexico. Some of the finest Aztec stone sculptures are on display, including an important image of the god Ehecatl.
- The Museo de Sitio (Site Museum) at Calixtlahuaca is located just north of the modern city of Toluca in its municipality. This small museum has some of the finds excavated at the site in the 1930s. It has a circular form in imitation of the famous circular temple of Calixtlahuaca.
- The CASART or Casa de Artesanias (House of Handcrafts) is located on Avenida Tollocan near the highway leading to Mexico City. This large outlet run by the government specialized in crafts produced in the Toluca Valley area. Items include sweaters from Gualupita, Rebozos (shawls) from Tenancingo, rugs from Temoaya, pottery from Metepec, Temascalcingo and Valle de Bravo, as well as wooden items from Santa María Rayón.
- The Museo Modelo de Ciencias e Industria (Modelo Museum of Science and Industry) is a science museum of Grupo Modelo, a leading company in the brewing industry.

== Culture ==
Toluca is home to a series of traditional festivities such as the typical solemn "silent procession" that takes place every Holy Friday when the Catholic congregation from Toluca and its surroundings get together in the centre of the city to express their respect and devotion for Jesus Christ's sacrifice. Easter and Lent are celebrated in a similar way.

Currently, there are two official orchestras: a State one and a Municipal one. The one from the State is the Orquesta Sinfónica del Estado de México. Higher education institutions have marching bands, and in some towns there are wind bands.

The dancing institutions include the Instituto Mexiquense de Cultura. There are also schools of dance such as the Escuela de Bellas Artes and the UAEM.

There is also a youth marching band of Toluca called "Eagles of Anahuac". This band was formed about 35 years ago and was the first youth marching band in the country.

== Food and drink ==
Mexican food mixes European and Mesoamerican elements. In Toluca the most famous dish is chorizo, a regional sausage made of ground pork and tomato sauce, pumpkin mole, pipian and other ingredients such as salt, pepper, white wine, almonds, potatoes, vinegar, garlic and chile. In Mexico, the word "chorizo" is used as a nickname for anything (anybody) from Toluca. Other popular dishes, which must be mentioned are "tacos de carnitas" (pork tacos) and "tacos de plaza" made of barbacoa, pork, chicharron (fried pork rind), papalo (Porophyllum ruderale), onion, coriander, nopales, cueritos, chili sauce, salt and lime. The traditional food includes vegetables from the region such as "quelites", "quintoniles", "huazontles", spinach, "verdolagas", carrots, potatoes, tomatoes and so forth.

Toluca has a variety of traditional candies such as "alegrías", "jamoncillos" (a candy bar with flavors such as lemon, pineapple, apple or chocolate), "lemons" (lemons decorated with coconut), "chilacayotes" (pumpkin in syrup), "cocadas" (mainly made with coconut), "palanquetas" (a peanut bar covered with melted sugar).

Traditional drinks include "mosquito" and, as in many other regions of Mexico, "tepache". "Mosquito" is a drink obtained from the infusion of fruit in alcohol. "Mosquito" can be also flavored with sugar, syrup or honey. "Tepache", the popular beverage of fermented pineapple and other fruit, is not native to the Valley of Toluca since this tropical plant does not grow there.

== Sports ==
Several professional clubs are based in Toluca:

Club	Sport	Founded	League	Venue	Opened
Deportivo Toluca F.C.	Association football	1917	Liga MX	Estadio Nemesio Díez	1954
Deportivo Toluca F.C. Femenil	Association football	2017	Liga MX Femenil	Estadio Nemesio Díez	1954

Additionally, Toluca is home to the following amateur or college teams.

Team	Stadium	Sport	League	Opened
Potros UAEM	Estadio Juan Josafat Pichardo	American football	ONEFA	1972
Potros UAEM	Estadio Alberto "Chivo" Córdoba	Association football	Ascenso MX	1964

Estadio Nemesio Diez

Toluca is home to Toluca FC, commonly nicknamed Diablos Rojos (Red Devils), one of the most successful and historically significant football clubs in Mexico. Founded in 1917, the club has competed in the Liga MX since the 1950s and has won multiple national and international titles. During the late 1990s and 2000s, the club experienced one of the most successful periods in Mexican football, winning several league championships. The club plays at Estadio Nemesio Díez, popularly nicknamed "La Bombonera", a historic stadium inaugurated in 1954 with a capacity of approximately 30,000 spectators and considered one of the oldest and most iconic football venues in Mexico. Located near downtown Toluca, the stadium is regarded as one of the city's main landmarks. The club's women's team, Deportivo Toluca Femenil, founded in 2017, also plays its home matches at Estadio Nemesio Díez and competes in the Liga MX Femenil.

Famous boxers often use Toluca as a training center. These have included Julio César Chávez and Puerto Rico's Wilfredo Vazquez, among others.

Professional wrestler Tito Santana is billed from Toluca, although he is actually from Mission, Texas.

== Notable people ==
- Alejandro Ariceaga
- José María Bustamante
- Ángel María Garibay K.
- Luis Nishizawa
- Adriana Barraza
- Salvador Mejía Alejandre
- Alberto Chimal
- Ninel Conde
- Mayrín Villanueva
- Carmen Becerra
- Vicente Pereda
- Tito Santana
- Diego Luna

== Twin towns – sister cities ==
Toluca internationally is twinned with:

- Brescia, Italy
- Cali, Colombia
- Caparroso, Spain
- Cartago, Costa Rica
- Debrecen, Hungary
- Fort Worth, United States
- Nanchang, China
- Novi Sad, Serbia
- Ramallah and al-Bireh, Palestine
- Saitama, Japan
- Santiago de Cuba, Cuba
- Suwon, South Korea
- La Vega, Dominican Republic

Toluca is also locally twinned with:

- (Mexico) Xalapa, Veracruz

In addition, Toluca also cooperates with:

- Curitiba, Brazil
- Lorient, France
- La Plata, Argentina
- Da Nang, Vietnam

== See also ==
- Symbols of Toluca
- List of highest large cities in the world
