= Venezuelan Mexicans =

Venezuelan Mexicans venezolano-mexicanos
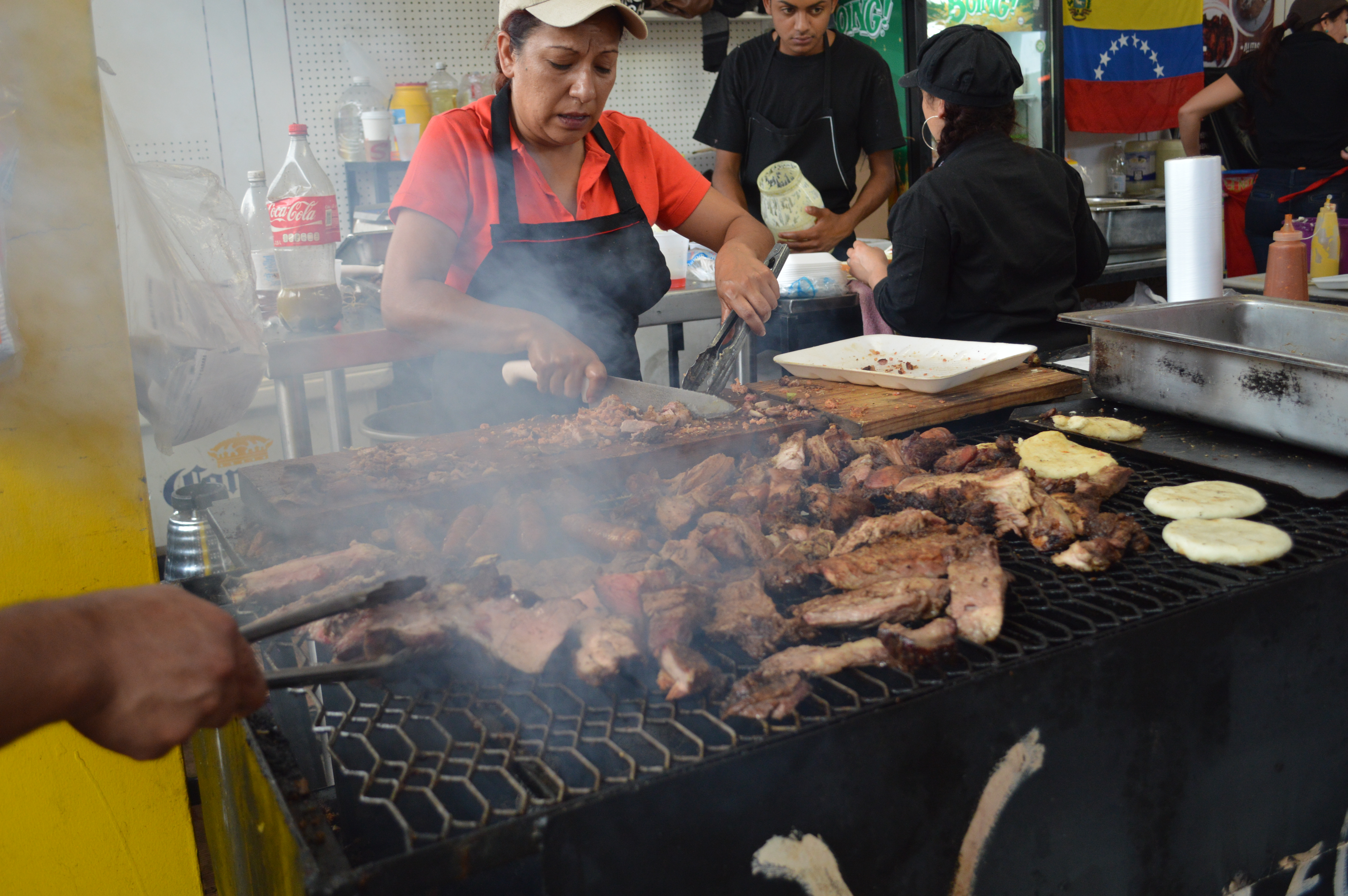
- Venezuelan cuisine in Mexico City

Total population
- ~110,000 Venezuela-born residents (2026)

Regions with significant populations
- Throughout Mexico, but mostly concentrated in urban areas for example: Mexico City, Guadalajara, Monterrey, Puebla, León, Aguascalientes, Ciudad Juárez, Toluca, San Luis Potosí, Villahermosa, Matamoros, Mérida, Cancún, Tijuana, coastal regions of Chiapas, Quintana Roo, Veracruz

Languages
- Venezuelan Spanish, minority of other Languages of Venezuela

Religion
- Mainly Roman Catholicism with minorities of Protestantism, Judaism

Related ethnic groups
- Venezuelans, Mexicans

Venezuelan Mexicans (Spanish: venezolano-mexicanos) are Mexicans who trace their heritage, or part of their heritage, to the nation of Venezuela. As of 2015, Venezuelans were the fifth largest immigrant group in Mexico, following Americans, Guatemalans, Spaniards and Colombians. By 2020, the Venezuelan population became the third largest immigrant group.

== History ==
There has been a Venezuelan presence in Mexico since at least 1895, when the National Census counted 35 residents. The number of Venezuelan Mexicans made a small peak in the 1980s and began to decline into the 1990s. Going into the 2000s, the number of Venezuelan Mexicans increased significantly. According to the 2010 Mexican census, there were more than 10,000 Venezuelan Mexicans residing in Mexico.

In 2000, the Venezuelan presence in Mexico was not large enough to be in the ten largest immigrant groups. In the fifteen years up to 2015 there was a 517% growth in the community, significantly surpassing the growth of Colombians (282%) and Argentines (218%).

=== Venezuelan refugee crisis ===
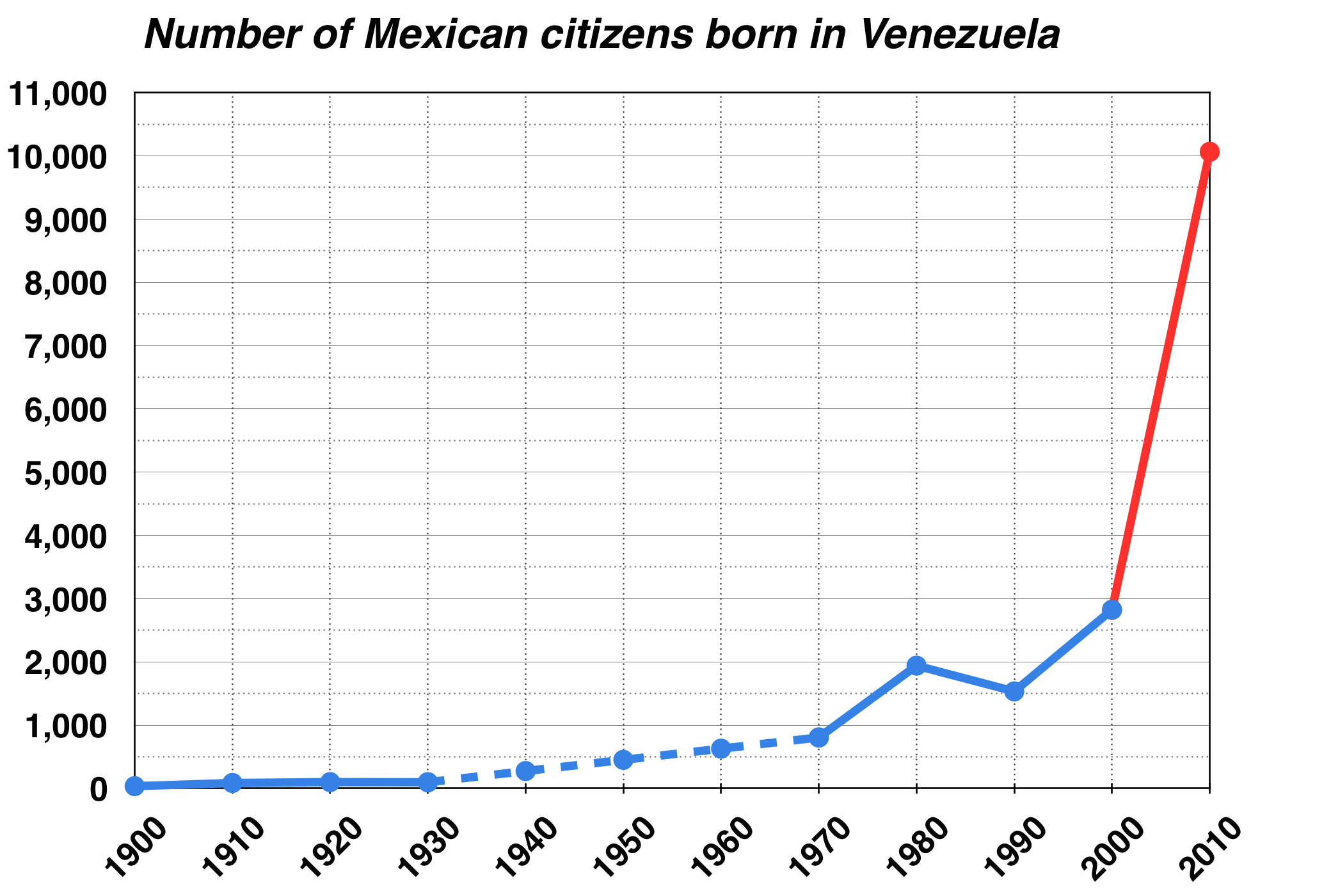
Dotted line represents simulated data Source: INEGI

The most recent influx of immigrants has resulted from the Venezuelan refugee crisis, a crisis occurring due to the adverse effects of the Hugo Chávez and his Bolivarian Revolution in Venezuela. Compared to the 2000 Census, there has been an increase from the 2,823 Venezuelan Mexicans in 2000 to 10,063 in 2010, a 357% increase of Venezuelan-born individuals living in Mexico.

Mexico granted 975 Venezuelans permanent identification cards in the first 5 months of 2014 alone, a number that doubled that of Venezuelans granted ID cards altogether in 2013 and a number that would have represented 35% of all Venezuelan Mexicans in Mexico in the year 2000.

During June 2016, Venezuelans surpassed Americans (historically, first) for number of new work visas granted. The 1,183 visas granted in June were a 20% increase from the 981 granted in May. The main destinations are Mexico City, Nuevo León and Tabasco (due to the state's petroleum industry).

As of May 2017, Venezuelans were first in the number of permanent residency cards granted and the number of visas granted to "visiters for humanitarian reasons" (Tarjetas de Visitantes por Razones Humanitarias). In the first six months of 2017, 1,420 Venezuelans had sought asylum in Mexico. Resulting in Venezuelans making up 21% of the total asylum seekers in Mexico, significantly up from the 4% of total asylum seekers in the first half of 2016.

In 2019, Mexico received 17,254 Venezuelan migrants. In December 2021, the Secretariat of the Interior announced that it would require Venezuelans apply for travel visas in order to enter the country.

== See also ==
- Mexico–Venezuela relations
- Venezuelan diaspora
- Immigration to Mexico
