= Cosmovitral =

Stained glass mural and botanical garden

Coordinates: 19°17′37.08″N 99°39′11.49″W

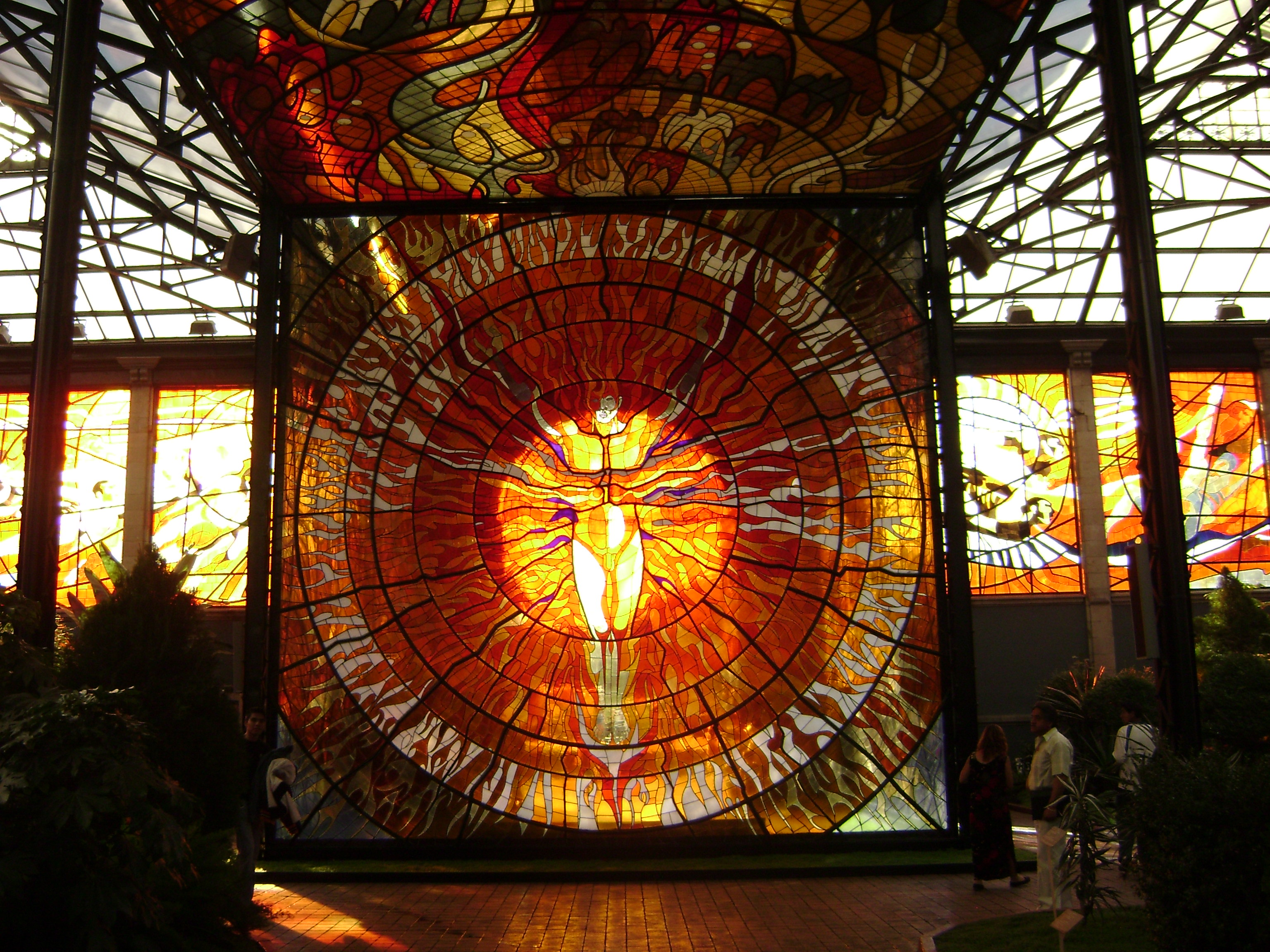
The Sun Man (stained glass).

The Cosmovitral is a stained glass mural and botanical garden located in Toluca, Mexico. The building takes its name from the mural which is set in the building's huge windows that surround the building and in the ceiling. The building originally was constructed in 1910 as the 16 de Septiembre Market. It was not until 1975 when the first female Mayor of Toluca, Yolanda Sentíes, had the 16 de Septiembre Market reallocated and successfully gauged enough social and political support to transform the building into a space for art. The Cosmovitral was designed by the notable local artisan Leopoldo Flores.

== History ==
=== The 16 de Septiembre Market ===
The building began as the 16th de Septiembre Market. It was constructed between 1909 and 1910 with the aim of opening it for the centennial of Mexico's independence. It was the first permanent market built in the city. The building is Art Nouveau designed by engineer Manuel Arratia, with the metalwork done by Fundidora y Aceros Monterrey. The building covers a half hectare and only the bottom third is of concrete. The upper two thirds and the roof are made of metal and glass. The design of the building resembles a train station. The market was the most important in Toluca. On Fridays, this market would be surrounded by a tianguis, or flea market that would block many of the roads around it. The building was closed as a market in 1975.

=== The Cosmovitral ===

When the market closed, there were several ideas about what to do with the space. Some wanted to sell it to private interests, some wanted to clear it for a plaza but Leopoldo Flores successfully lobbied to make the buildings huge windows and ceiling into a space for art. It was also decided to convert the floorspace into a botanical garden.

=== Stained glass mural ===
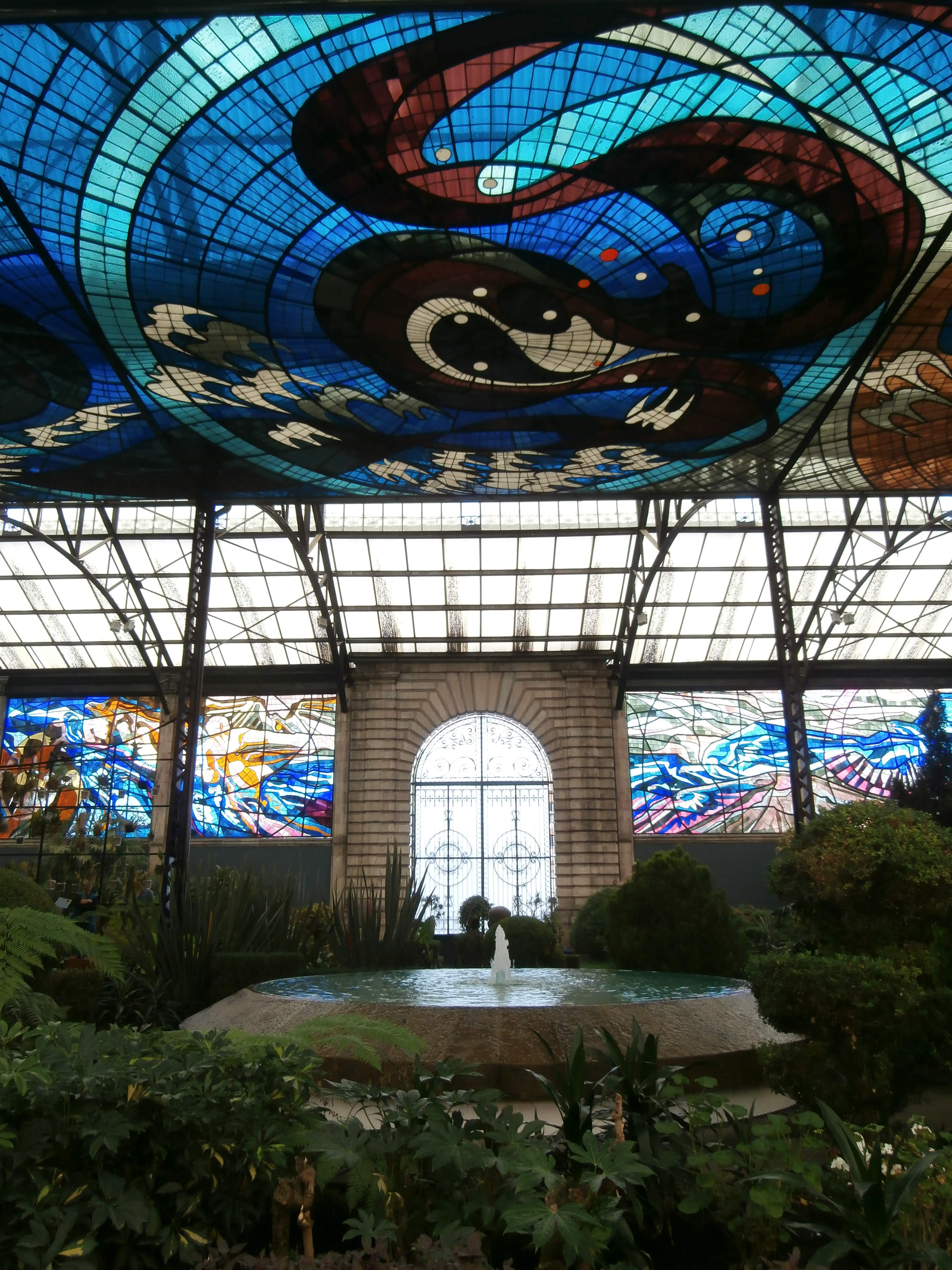
Ceiling of Cosmovitral

The concept of Leopoldo Flores was novel – a mural done in stained glass that would encircle the building on its windows and run along the ceiling. Before executing it, the artist spent a year studying and developing the concept, and working out the engineering issues. The name of the mural is Cosmovitral, which is an amalgam of “cosmos” and “vitral” (Spanish for glass). The name is now used for the building as well as the artwork. The theme of the work is “Man and his relationship with the universe.”

The project began with a complete scrub-down of the market building as well as reinforcements to the walls to support the weight of the about-to –be-installed stained glass windows. At the same time that the building was being prepared, the Angel Maria Garibay Plaza was built on the west side of the building.

The first stage of the work was to construct the windows. Flores and sixty artisans worked for three years, from 1978 to 1980. The window-mural consists of 71 modules which cover an area of about 3,200 meters square. The work uses approximately 75 tons of metal supports, 45 tons of blown glass and 25 tons of lead to join the about 500,000 glass pieces, which range in size from 15 to 45 cm. Twenty eight different colors of glass were used, most of which came from Italy, Germany, France, Belgium, Japan, Canada and the United States. On the north side of the building, blues dominate, with brighter colors on the south side. The sun is placed on the east side. The windows are the largest of their kind in the world. The theme depicted by the windows centers on universal dualities and antagonisms, the struggle between life and death, good and evil, day and night and creation and destruction, all shown in a cosmic continuum. In 1980, with the artwork and botanical garden in place, the Cosmovitral opened to the public.

Due to changes in the local government, work on the building stopped shortly after the 1980 opening. Ten years later, the work would begin again, this time on the ceiling portion of the work, called the Cosmoplafón, which runs from one end of the building to the other.

The main focus of the work is a panel with a fiery sun bearing the image of a man, who represents mankind. The image represents mankind in perfect harmony with the forces of creation, virtue, art, science, truth, beauty, wisdom and other qualities. This panel is known as the Hombre Sol or Sun Man. Each year on the spring equinox, the sun aligns with the Hombre Sol. This annual event last about twenty minutes in the late afternoon and is celebrated with a classical music concert, timed to the passing of the sun. When the rays of the sun pass through the stained glass work, the image of the sun shines brighter, as if it is on fire. Sometimes the equinox show is hosted by Leopoldo Flores himself, which he last did in 2004. The Hombre Sol has become the symbol of Toluca and the State of Mexico.

=== Botanical gardens ===
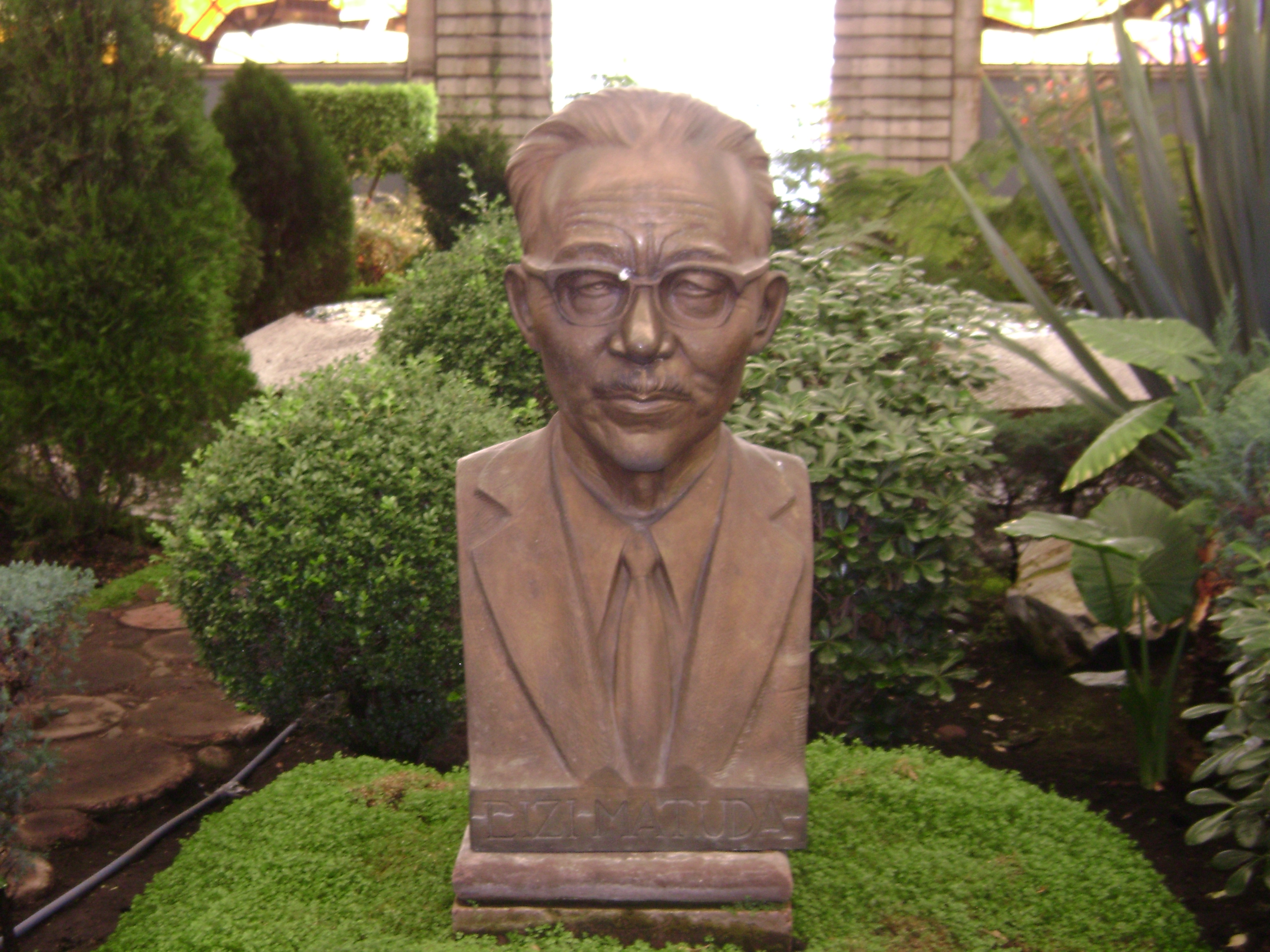
Eizi Matuda.

The botanical garden contains over 500 of plant species from both Mexico State and around the world. In the center is a bust of Eizi Matuda, a Japanese scientist who is known for his research into the flora of Mexico State, classifying more than 6,000 species. Another monument in the garden is the “lantern of friendship” which was a gift from the Saitama Prefecture to the State of Mexico when the two became sister states in 1980. The garden host arts exhibitions and other events such as an exposition and workshop event on bonsai plants.

== Operation of the Cosmovitral ==
The Cosmovitral is located on the corner of Juárez and Lerdo de Tejada streets in the downtown. The main facade overlooks the plaza named for priest, researcher and philosopher Ángel María Garibay Kintana. It is open Tuesday to Sunday, 9 a.m. to 6 p.m. with tickets at 10 pesos for adults, 5 pesos for children. Guided tours, mostly to explain the Cosmovitral's stained glass, are available. Art exhibitions are hosted regularly.

The Cosmovitral receives about 500 to 600 visits per day, which can double during the Christmas holidays, prompting extended hours. About 60% of the visitors are from the Valley of Mexico, 20% from other parts of Mexico, 15% from Toluca proper and 5% are foreigners. The building completed 100 years of age in 2009, prompting renovation work. The building stone on the outside was cleaned, new lighting added and damage to the lead soldering due to climate repaired. Since the colors of the glass are integrated and not painted on, they do not degrade. The only occasional damage is the breaking of a glass piece when someone throws a rock, which happens very rarely even though 48 of the 71 panels face the street. To date, not a single piece of the work has broken due to earthquake, in part due to the careful work done in engineering the supports for the windows. Keeping the windows clean requires two full-time workers. It takes Cirilo Hernandez Garcia and Cristobal Gonzalez Martinez one year and three months to make a round cleaning all half million glass pieces, a job they have been doing for 25 years. The cleaning is done with only water, a fine wire brush and rags, as chemicals damage the glass.
