= Indigenous peoples of Mexico =

Native Mexicans
Mexicanos nativos (Spanish)
- Indigenous population by municipality in Mexico according to the CDI (2020 census)

Total population
- Based on identification: 23,232,391 (2020 census) 19.41% of the Mexican population; Based on household: 11,800,247 people live in indigenous households (9.36%). (Note: This is the most commonly cited number in terms of Indigenous peoples by the government. However, other numbers are occasionally cited as well.); Based on language: 865,972 people monolingual in an Indigenous language (0.6%); 7,364,645 people who speak an Indigenous language (Including bilinguals in Spanish.) (6.1%)

Regions with significant populations
- Yucatán, Oaxaca, Chiapas, Quintana Roo, Campeche, Veracruz, Guerrero, Hidalgo, Puebla, Michoacán

Languages
- Nahuatl, Yucatec Maya, Tzotzil, Mixtec, Zapotec, Otomi, Huichol, Totonac and another 54 living languages along the Mexican territory, as well as Spanish

Religion
- Christianity (predominantly Roman Catholic, with Amerindian religious elements, including Mesoamerican religion)

Related ethnic groups
- Mestizo Mexicans; Other indigenous peoples of the Americas

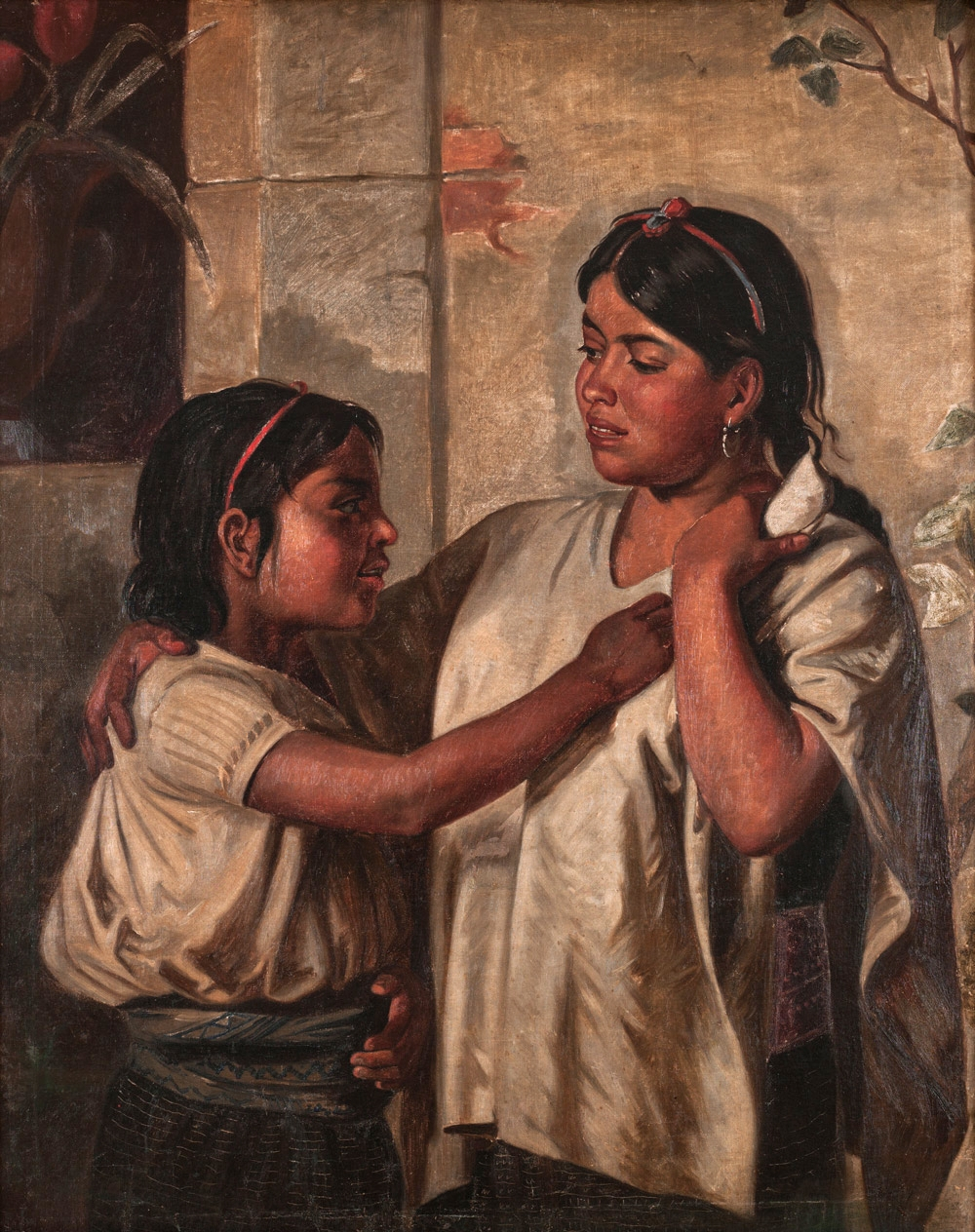
Indias de Oaxaca (c. 1877) by Felipe Santiago Gutiérrez depicting Oaxaca Amerindians.

Indigenous peoples of Mexico (Spanish: Pueblos indígenas de México), also known as Native Mexicans (Mexicanos nativos), are those who are part of communities that trace their roots back to populations and communities that existed in what is now Mexico before the arrival of Europeans.

The number of Indigenous Mexicans is defined through the second article of the Mexican Constitution. The Mexican census does not classify individuals by race, using the cultural-ethnicity of Indigenous communities that preserve their Indigenous languages, traditions, beliefs, and cultures. As a result, the count of Indigenous peoples in Mexico does not include those of mixed Indigenous and European heritage who have not preserved their Indigenous cultural practices. Genetic studies have found that most Mexicans are of partial Indigenous heritage. According to the National Indigenous Institute (INI) and the National Institute of Indigenous Peoples (CDI), in 2012 the Indigenous population was approximately 15 million people, divided into 68 ethnic groups. The 2020 Censo General de Población y Vivienda reported 11,132,562 people living in households where someone speaks an Indigenous language, and 23,232,391 people who were identified as Indigenous based on self-identification.

The Indigenous population is distributed throughout the territory of Mexico but is especially concentrated in the Sierra Madre del Sur, the Yucatán Peninsula, the Sierra Madre Oriental, the Sierra Madre Occidental, and neighboring areas. The states with the largest Indigenous population are Oaxaca and Yucatán, both having Indigenous majorities, with the former having the highest percentage of Indigenous population. Since the Spanish colonization, the northern, western and Bajio regions of Mexico have had lower percentages of Indigenous peoples, but some notable groups include the Rarámuri, the Tepehuán, the Yaquis, and the Yoreme.

== Definition ==
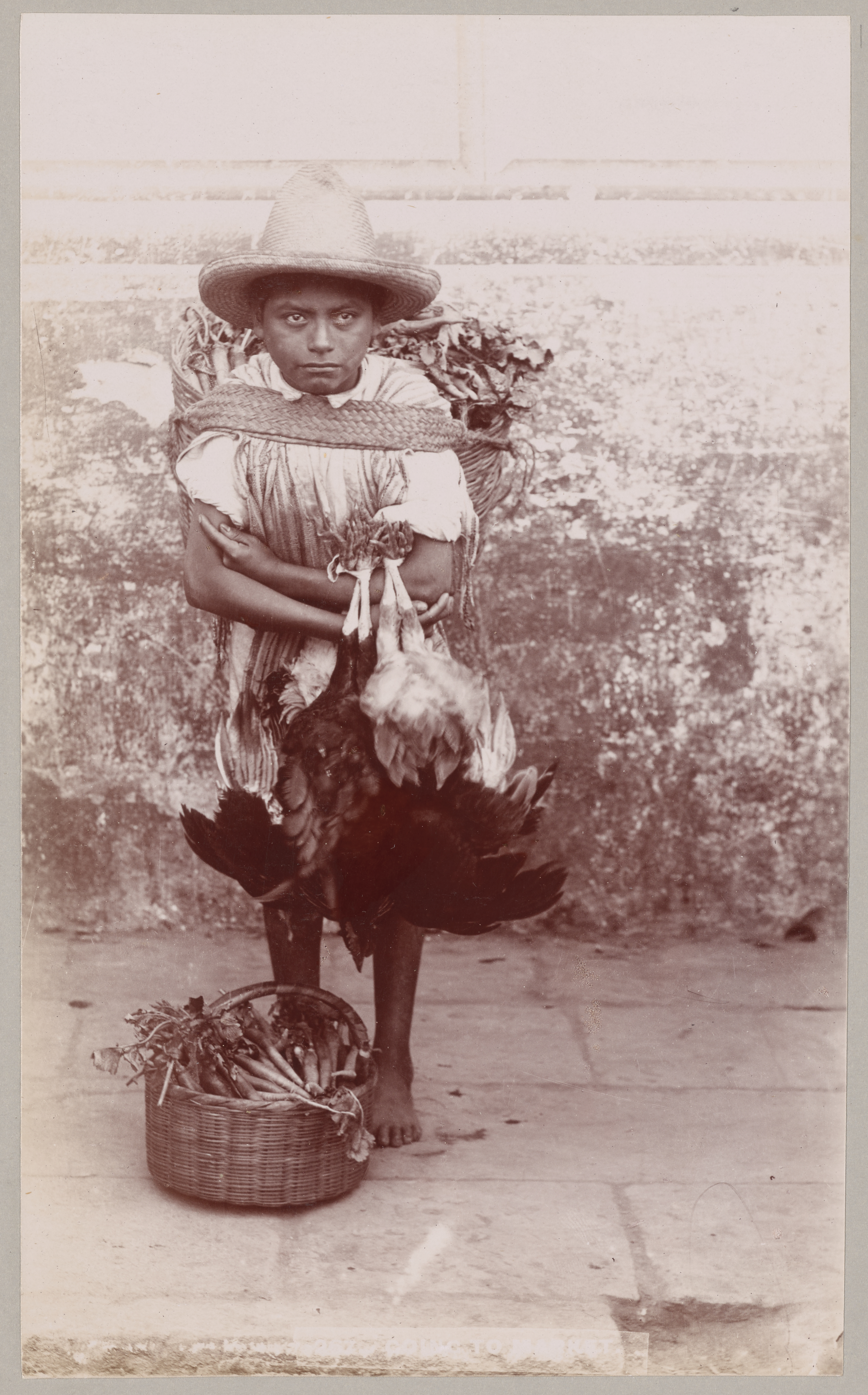
1896 photograph of an Indigenous Mexican boy.

In the second article of the Mexican Constitution, Mexico defines itself as a pluricultural nation in recognition of the diverse ethnic groups that constitute it and where the Indigenous peoples are the original foundation. The number of Indigenous Mexicans is measured using constitutional criteria.

The category of Indigena (Indigenous) can be defined narrowly according to linguistic criteria, including only persons that speak one of Mexico's 89 Indigenous languages; this is the categorization used by the National Mexican Institute of Statistics. It can also be defined broadly to include all persons who self-identify as having an Indigenous cultural background, whether or not they speak the language of the Indigenous group they identify with. This means that the percentage of the Mexican population defined as "Indigenous" varies according to the definition applied; cultural activists have referred to the usage of the narrow definition of the term for census purposes as "statistical genocide."

The Indigenous peoples in Mexico have the right of free determination under the second constitution article. According to this article, Indigenous peoples are granted:

- the right to decide the internal forms of social, economic, political, and cultural organization;
- the right to apply their normative systems of regulation as long as human rights and gender equality are respected;
- the right to preserve and enrich their languages and cultures;
- the right to elect representatives before the municipal council where their territories are located;

The Law of Linguistic Rights of the Indigenous Languages recognizes 89 Indigenous languages as national languages, which have the same validity as Spanish in all territories where they are spoken. According to the National Institute of Statistics, Geography and Data Processing (INEGI), approximately 5.4% of the population speaks an Indigenous language. The recognition of Indigenous languages and the protection of Indigenous cultures is granted not only to the ethnic groups Indigenous to modern-day Mexican territory but also to other North American Indigenous groups that migrated to Mexico from the United States in the nineteenth century and those who immigrated from Guatemala in the 1980s.

== History ==
=== Pre-Columbian civilizations ===
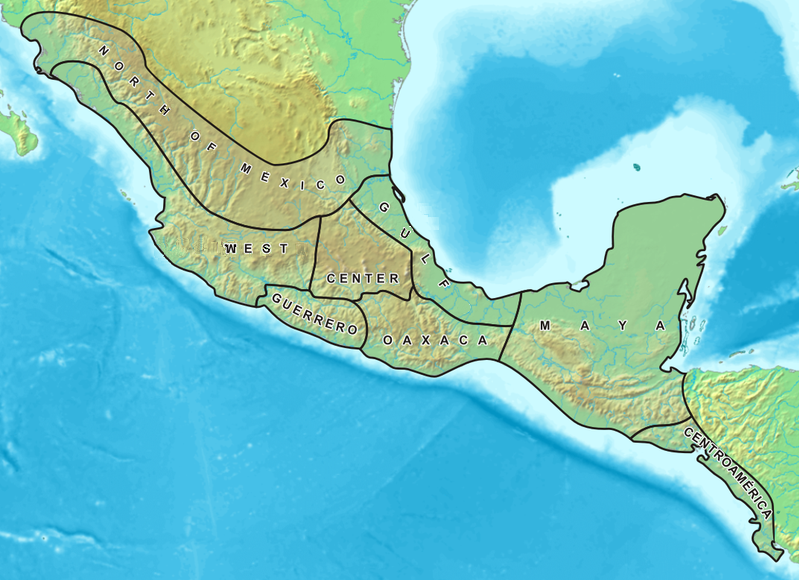
Mesoamerica and its cultural areas.

The prehispanic civilizations of what now is known as Mexico are often divided into two regions: Mesoamerica, the cultural area where several complex civilizations developed before the arrival of the Spanish in the sixteenth century, and Aridoamerica (or simply "The North"), the arid region north of the Tropic of Cancer which was less densely populated. Despite the conditions, the Mogollon culture and peoples established urban population centers at Casas Grandes and Cuarenta Casas in a vast territory that encompassed northern Chihuahua state and parts of Arizona and New Mexico in the United States.

Mesoamerica was densely populated by diverse Indigenous ethnic groups which, although sharing common cultural characteristics, spoke different languages and developed unique civilizations.

One of the most influential civilizations in Mesoamerica was the Olmec civilization, sometimes referred to as the "Mother Culture of Mesoamerica." The later civilization in Teotihuacan reached its peak around 600 AD when the city possibly became the sixth largest city in the world, whose cultural and theological systems influenced the Toltec and Aztec civilizations in later centuries. Evidence has been found on the existence of polyethnic communities or neighborhoods in Teotihuacan (and other large urban areas like Tenochtitlan).

The Maya civilization, influenced by other Mesoamerican civilizations, developed a vast cultural region in southeast Mexico and northern Central America. In contrast, the Zapotec and Mixtec cultures dominated the valley of Oaxaca and the Purépecha in western Mexico.

==== Trade ====
Scholars agree that significant systems of trading existed between the cultures of Mesoamerica, Aridoamerica, and the American Southwest, and the architectural remains and artifacts share a commonality of knowledge attributed to this trade network. The routes stretched far into Mesoamerica and reached as far north as ancient communities that included such population centers in the United States such as Snaketown, Chaco Canyon, and Ridge Ruin near Flagstaff (considered some of the finest artifacts ever located).

=== Colonial era ===
By the time of the arrival of the Spanish in central Mexico, many peoples of Mesoamerica (with the notable exception of the Tlaxcaltecs and the Purépecha Kingdom of Michoacán) were loosely joined under the Aztec Empire, the last Nahua civilization to flourish in Central Mexico. The capital of the empire, Tenochtitlan, became one of the largest urban centers in the world, with an estimated population of 350,000 inhabitants.

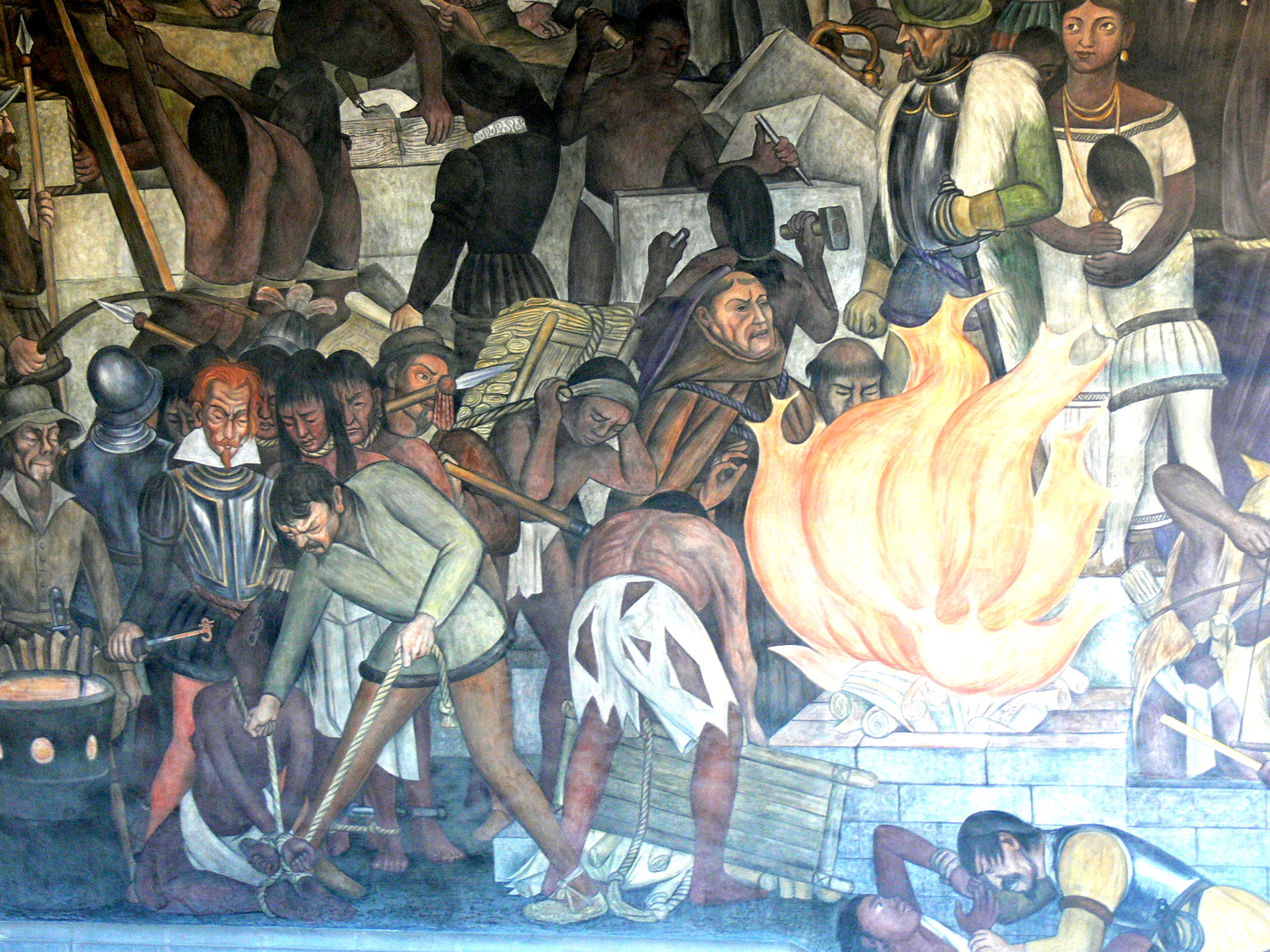
Mural by Diego Rivera in the National Palace of Mexico depicting the burning of Maya literature by the Catholic Church.

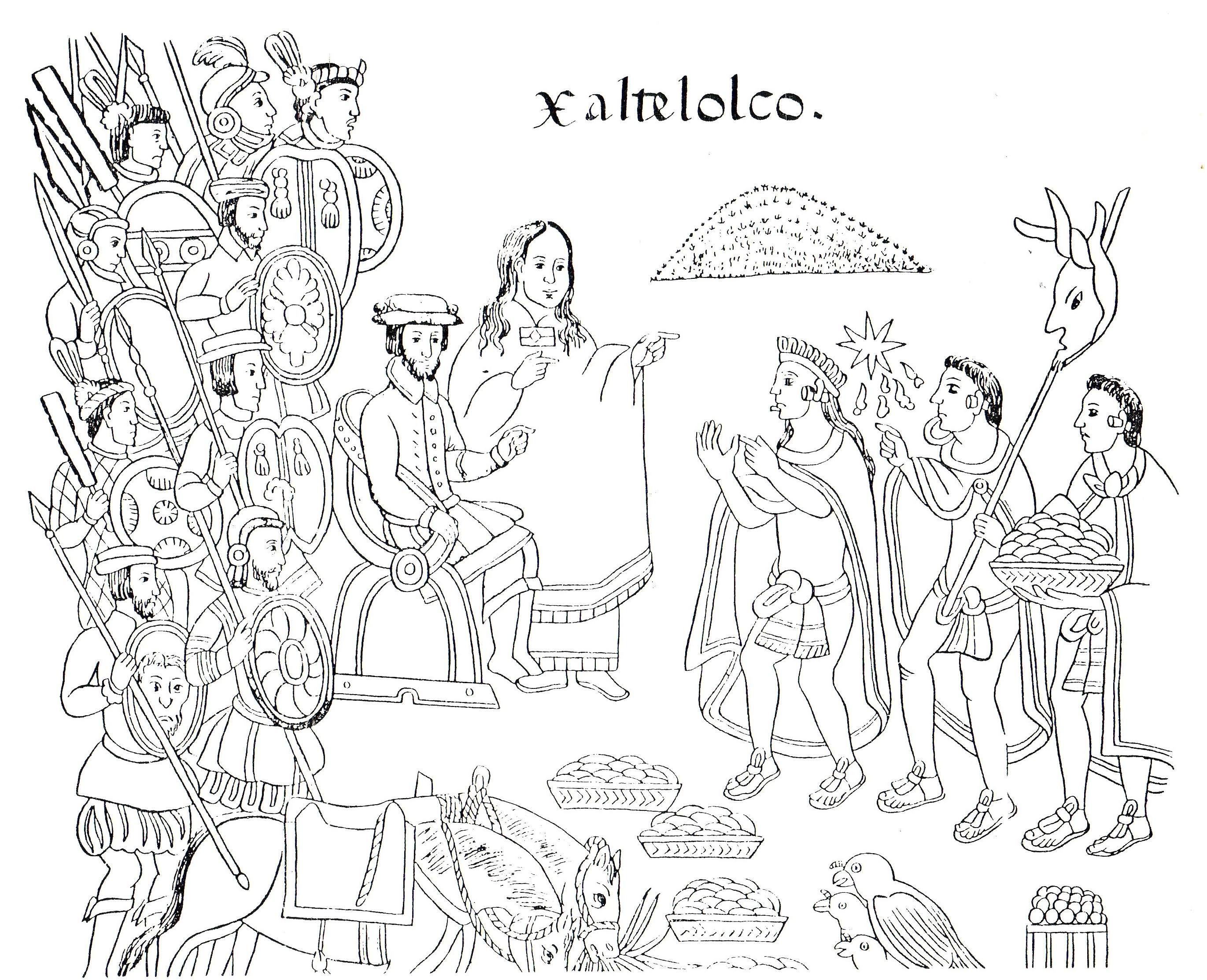
A 16th-century manuscript illustrating La Malinche and the contact between Spaniards and Aztecs.

During the conquest of the Aztec Empire, the Spanish conquistadors allied with other ethnic groups in the region, including the Tlaxcaltecs. This strategy succeeded due to discontent with Aztec rule, which demanded tributes and used conquered peoples for ritual sacrifice. During the following decades, the Spanish consolidated their rule in what became the viceroyalty of New Spain. Through the Valladolid Debate, the crown recognized the Indigenous nobility in Mesoamerica as nobles, freed Indigenous slaves, and kept the existing basic structure of Indigenous city-states. Indigenous communities were incorporated as communities under Spanish rule.

As Indigenous peoples were drawn into the colonial system, friars taught native scribes to write their languages using Latin letters so that there is a large corpus of colonial-era documentation in the Nahuatl language, Mixtec, Zapotec, Yucatec Maya, and others. Such a written tradition likely took hold through existing practices of pictorial writing found in many Indigenous codices. New Philology scholars have utilized the colonial-era alphabetic documentation to illuminate the colonial experience of Mesoamerican peoples from their viewpoints.

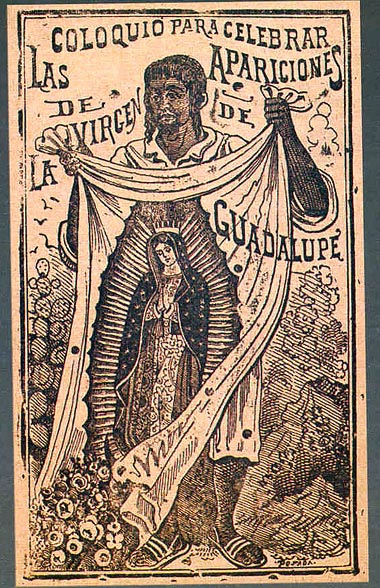
Juan Diego, hoja religiosa, etching by José Guadalupe Posada (pre-1895).

The encomienda system exploited the labor and tribute of Indigenous peoples for financial gain. This system was built upon pre-existing Mesoamerican labor duty and tribute practices, with Indigenous officials managing its continuation within their communities. There was a precipitous decline in Indigenous populations, mainly due to the spread of European diseases previously unknown in the Americas but also through war and forced labor. Pandemics wrought havoc, but Indigenous communities recovered with fewer members.

The colonial period in Mexico saw the convergence of diverse groups, including Indigenous peoples, Spaniards, enslaved Africans, and, from the late sixteenth century, Asian slaves (referred to as "chinos") introduced via the Manila Galleon. There was an intermingling of groups, with mixed-race castas, particularly mestizos, becoming a component of Spanish cities and, to a lesser extent, Indigenous communities. The Spanish legal structure formally separated what they called the República de Indios (the Republic of Indians) from the República de Españoles (Republic of Spaniards), with the latter encompassing all those in the Hispanic sphere: Spaniards, Africans, and mixed-race castas. Although Indigenous peoples were marginalized in the colonial system, and often rebelled, the paternalistic structure of colonial rule supported the continued existence and structure of Indigenous communities. The Spanish crown protected the land holdings of Indigenous communities. Communities and individuals had access to the Spanish legal system. However, these codes were often ignored in practice, and racial discrimination was prevalent in New Spain.

In the religious sphere, Indigenous men were banned from Christian priesthood following an early Franciscan attempt that included fray Bernardino de Sahagún to train an Indigenous group. Mendicants of the Franciscan, Dominican, and Augustinian orders initially evangelized Indigenous in their communities in what is often called the "spiritual conquest." On the northern frontiers, the Spanish created missions and settled Indigenous populations in these complexes, which prompted raids from those who resisted settlement (given the name Indios Bárbaros). The Jesuits were prominent in this enterprise until their expulsion from Spanish America in 1767. Catholicism, often with local characteristics, was the only permissible religion in the colonial era.

During the colonial period in Mexico, Indigenous women were frequently subjected to rape and sexual abuse by white men.

==== Indigenous land ====
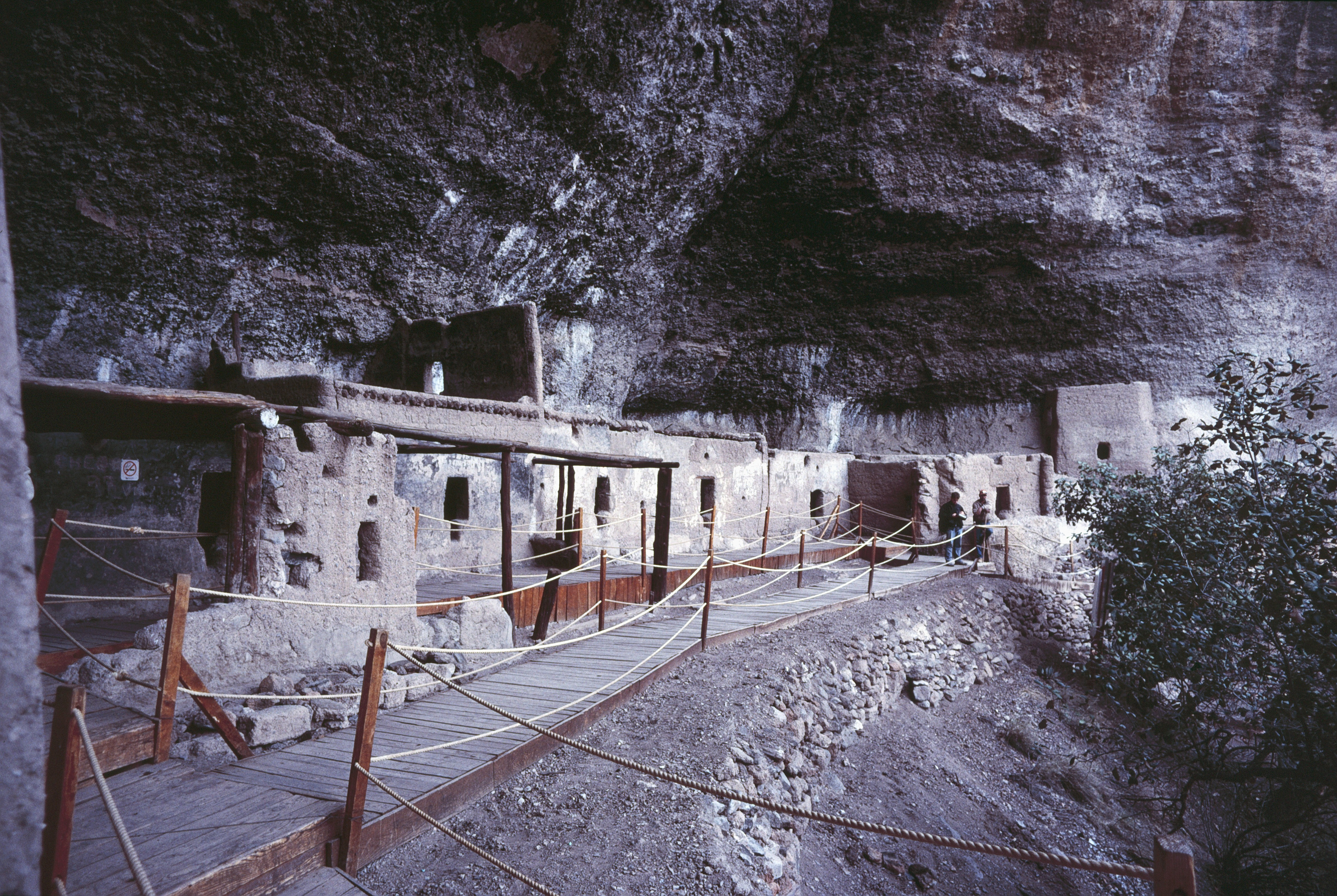
Cuarenta Casas, dwellings of the Mogollon culture.

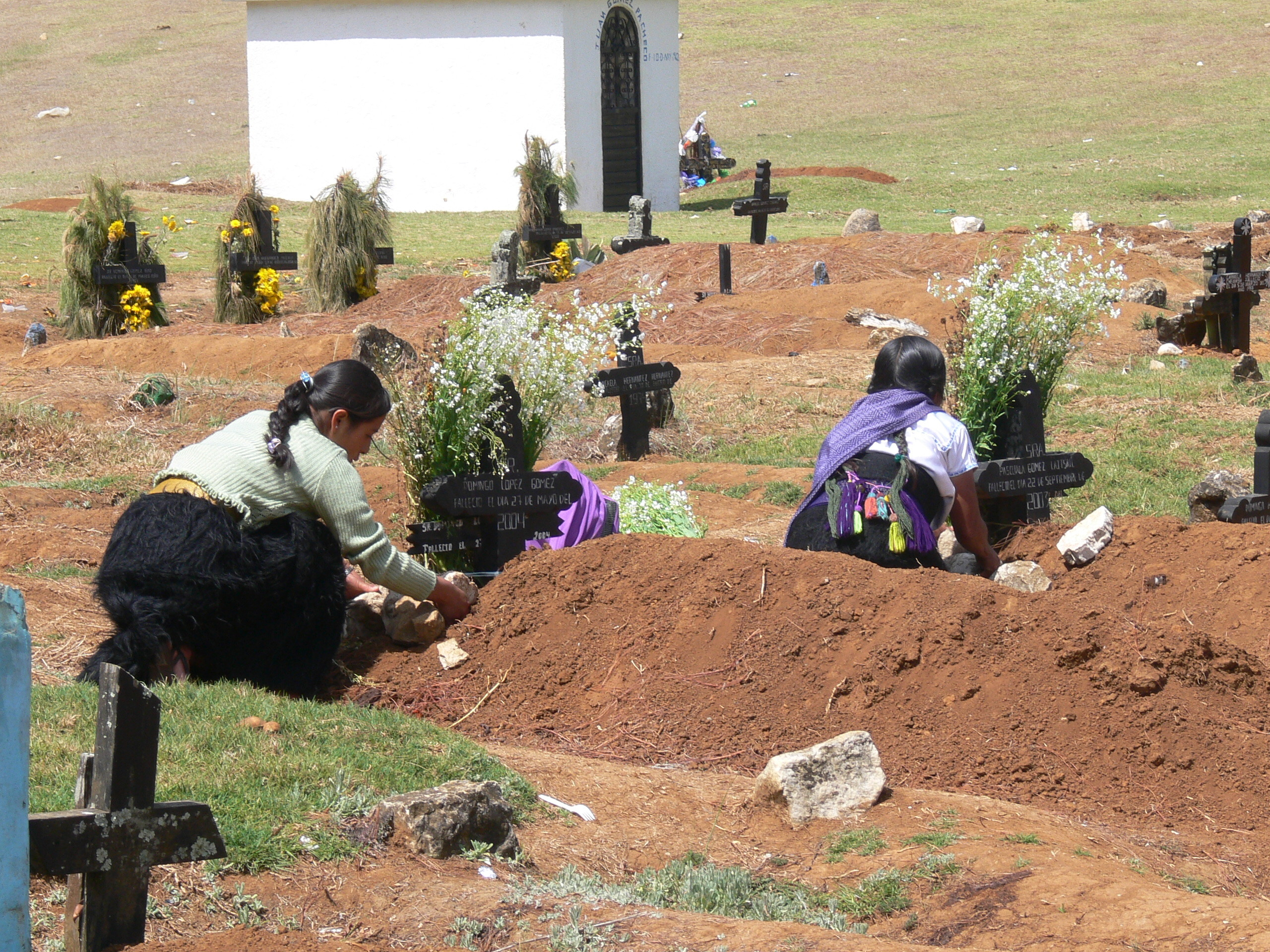
Cemetery of San Juan Chamula.

During the early colonial era in central Mexico, Indigenous communities faced the imposition of Spanish rule, which prioritized exploiting their labor over seizing their land. The institution of the encomienda, a crown grant of the labor of Indigenous communities to conquerors, was a key element of the imposition of Spanish rule. The Spanish crown initially maintained the Indigenous sociopolitical system of local rulers and land tenure, with the Spanish conquest of the Aztec Empire eliminating the superstructure of rule and replacing it with Spanish.

The crown had several concerns about the encomienda. First was that the holders of encomiendas called encomenderos, were becoming too powerful, essentially a seigneurial group that might challenge crown power (as shown in the conspiracy by conqueror Hernán Cortés's legitimate son and heir). The second was that the encomenderos monopolized Indigenous labor, excluding newly arriving Spaniards. Third, the crown was concerned about the damage done to the Indigenous vassals and their communities by the institution. Through the New Laws of 1542, the crown sought to phase out the encomienda and replace it with another crown mechanism of forced Indigenous labor, the repartimiento. Indigenous labor was no longer monopolized by a small group of conquerors and their descendants but apportioned to a larger group of Spaniards. Through the repartimiento, Indigenous peoples were obligated to perform low-paid labor for a certain number of weeks or months on Spanish enterprises, notably silver mining.

The land of Indigenous peoples is used for material and spiritual reasons. Religious, cultural, social, spiritual, and other events relating to their identity are also tied to the land. Indigenous people use collective property so that the services as mentioned earlier that the land provides are available to the entire community and future generations. This starkly contrasted the viewpoints of colonists who saw the land purely in an economic way where land could be transferred between individuals. Once the land of the Indigenous people and, therefore, their livelihood was taken from them, they became dependent on those who had land and power. Additionally, the spiritual services that the land provided were no longer available and caused a deterioration of Indigenous groups and cultures.

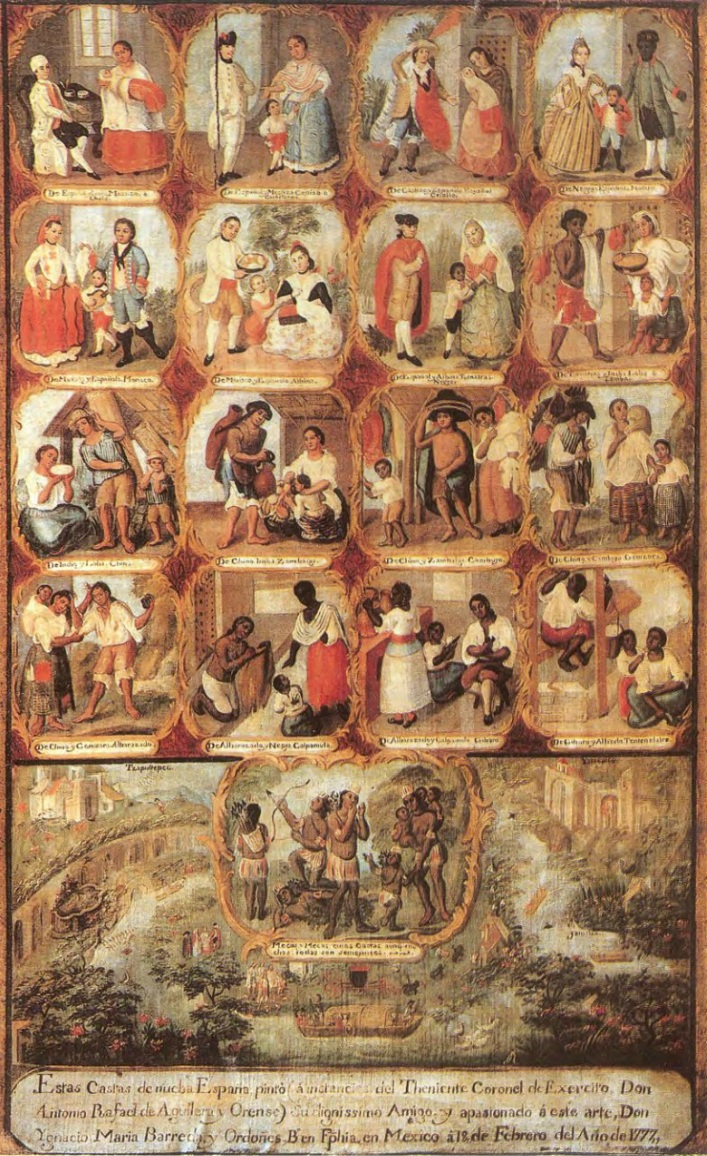
A casta painting of 18th c. colonial Mexico by Ignacio Maria Barreda, 1777.

==== Colonial-era racial categories ====
The Spanish legal system divided racial groups into two basic categories: the "República de Españoles," which consisted of all non-Indigenous people, initially Spaniards and black Africans, and the "República de Indios."

The degree to which racial category labels had legal and social consequences has been subject to academic debate since the idea of a "caste system" was developed by Ángel Rosenblat and Gonzalo Aguirre Beltrán in the 1940s. Both historians popularized racial status as a key organizing principle of Spanish colonial rule. However, recent academic studies have challenged this notion, considering it a flawed and ideologically based reinterpretation of the colonial period.

When Mexico gained independence in 1821, the casta designations were eliminated as a legal structure, but racial divides remained. White Mexicans argued about what the solution was to the "Indian Problem," that is, Indigenous who continued to live in communities and were not integrated politically or socially as citizens of the new republic. The Mexican Constitution of 1824 has several articles pertaining to Indigenous peoples.

=== Independence to the Mexican Revolution ===
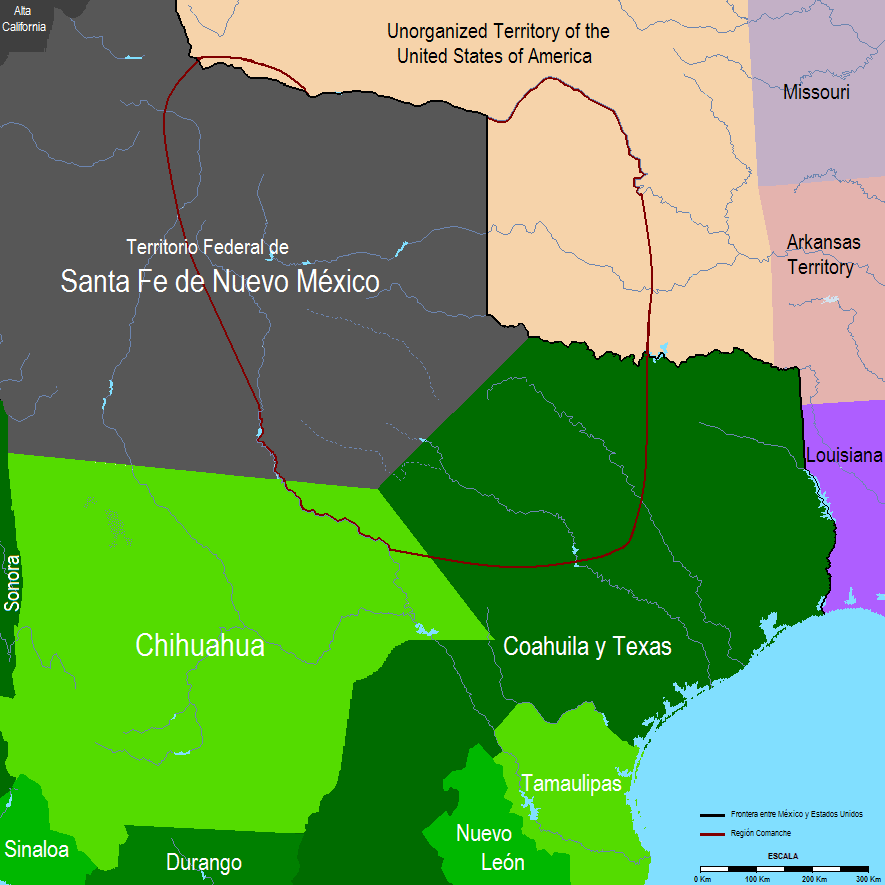
Comanchería in the 19th century.

The Mexican War of Independence was a decade-long struggle ending in 1821, in which Indigenous peoples participated for their motivations. The new country was named after its capital city, Mexico City. The new flag had a symbol of the Aztecs at its center, an eagle perched on a nopal cactus. Mexico declared the abolition of slavery in 1829 and the equality of all citizens before the law in 1857. Indigenous communities continued to have rights as corporations to maintain land holdings until the liberal Reforma. Some Indigenous individuals integrated into Mexican society, like Benito Juárez of Zapotec ethnicity, the first Indigenous president in the Americas. Juárez supported the removal of provisions protecting Indigenous communal land holdings through the Lerdo law.

In the North of Mexico, Indigenous peoples, such as the Comanche and Apache, who had acquired the horse, waged a successful warfare against the Mexican state. The Comanche controlled considerable territory, called the Comancheria. The Yaqui also had a long tradition of resistance, with the late nineteenth-century leader Cajemé being prominent during the Yaqui Wars. The Mayo joined their Yaqui neighbors in rebellion after 1867. In Yucatán, Mayas waged a protracted war against local Mexican control in the Caste War of Yucatán, which was most intensely fought in 1847 and lasted until 1915.

=== 20th century ===
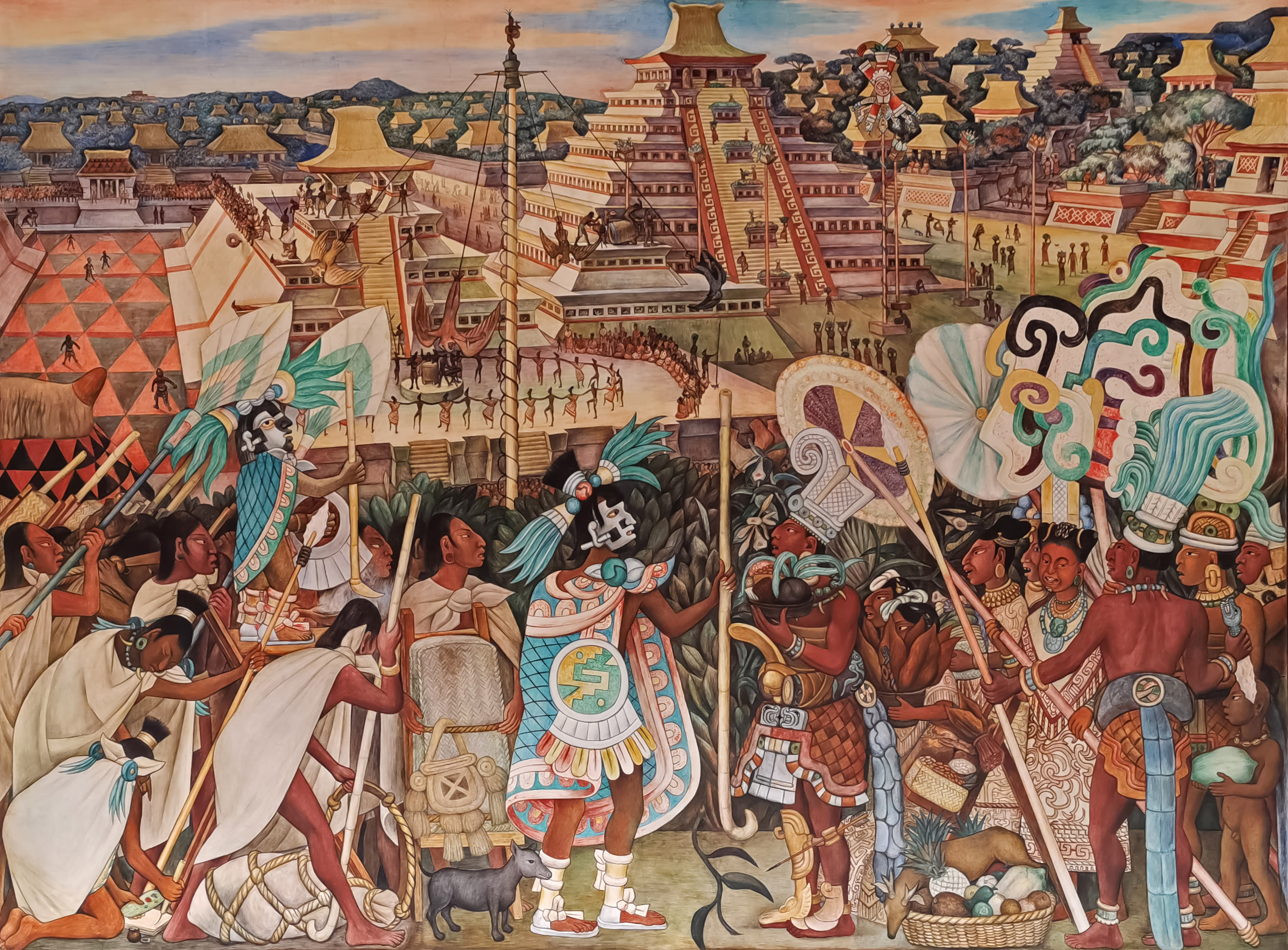
"The Totonac Civilization," a mural by Diego Rivera in the National Palace celebrates Mexico's Indigenous history.

The Mexican Revolution, a violent social and cultural movement that defined 20th-century Mexico, produced a nationalist sentiment that the Indigenous peoples were the foundation of Mexican society in a movement known as indigenismo. Several prominent artists promoted the "Indigenous Sentiment" (sentimiento indigenista) of the country, including Frida Kahlo and Diego Rivera. Throughout the twentieth century, the government established bilingual education in some Indigenous communities and published free bilingual textbooks. Some states of the federation appropriated an Indigenous inheritance to reinforce their identity.

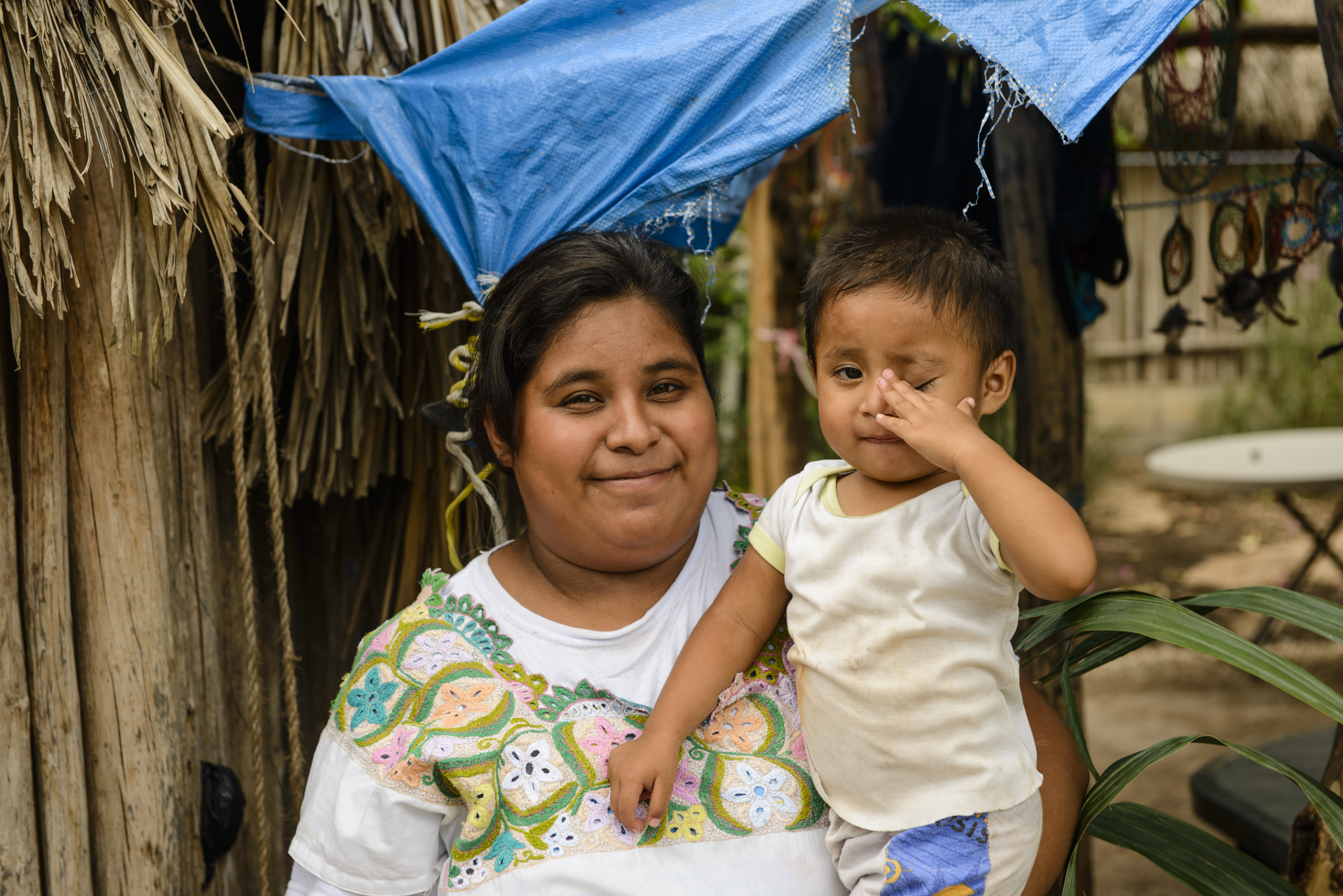
Maya mother and child in Quintana Roo.

Despite the official recognition of Indigenous peoples, the economic underdevelopment of their communities, accentuated by the crises of the 1980s and 1990s, has not allowed for the development of most Indigenous communities. Thousands of Indigenous Mexicans have emigrated to urban centers in Mexico and the United States. In Los Angeles, for example, the Mexican government has established electronic access to some of the consular services provided in Spanish as well as Zapotec and Mixe. Some of the Maya peoples of Chiapas have revolted, demanding better social and economic opportunities, requests voiced by the EZLN.

The Chiapas conflict of 1994 led to collaboration between the Mexican government and the Zapatista Army of National Liberation, a libertarian socialist Indigenous political group. This movement generated international media attention and united many Indigenous groups. In 1996, the San Andrés Larráinzar Accords were negotiated between the Zapatista Army of National Liberation and the Mexican government. The San Andrés Accords were the first time the Mexican government acknowledged Indigenous rights.

The government has made certain legislative changes to promote the development of rural and Indigenous communities and the promotion of Indigenous languages. The second article of the Constitution was modified to include the right of self-determination and requires state governments to promote and ensure the economic development of Indigenous communities and preserve their languages and traditions.

== Rights ==
=== Constitutional ===
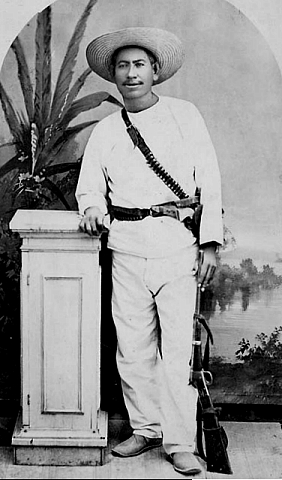
Cajemé, a prominent Yaqui military leader.

Indigenous communities in colonial Mexico established mechanisms to protect their legal rights, including the creation of the General Indian Court (Juzgado General de Indios). In the mid-nineteenth century, liberal reforms aimed at establishing equality before the law led to the dismantling of such institutions. These reforms sought to create a national identity not linked to racial or ethnic distinctions, impacting the legal protections previously afforded to Indigenous communities.

In the late twentieth century, there was a push for Indigenous rights and a recognition of Indigenous cultural identity. According to the constitutional reform of 2001, the following rights of Indigenous peoples are recognized:

- acknowledgment as Indigenous communities, right to self-ascription, and the application of their regulatory systems
- preservation of their cultural identity, land, consultation, and participation
- access to the jurisdiction of the state and development
- recognition of Indigenous peoples and communities as a subject of public law
- self-determination and self-autonomy
- remunicipalization for the advancement of Indigenous communities
- administer own forms of communication and media

The second article of the Constitution of Mexico recognizes and enforces the right of Indigenous peoples and communities to self-determination and autonomy to:

V. Preserve and improve their habitat and preserve the integrity of their lands per this constitution. VI. Be entitled to the estate and land property modalities established by this constitution and its derived legislation, to all private property rights and communal property rights, as well as to use and enjoy preferentially all the natural resources located at the places which the communities live in, except those defined as strategic areas according to the constitution. The communities shall be authorized to collaborate to achieve such goals.

Through the land reforms of the early 20th century, some Indigenous people had land rights under the ejido system. Under ejidos, Indigenous communities have usufruct rights of the land. Indigenous communities do this when they do not have the legal evidence to claim the land. In 1992, free market reforms allowed ejidos to be partitioned and sold. For this to happen, the PROCEDE program was established. The PROCEDE program surveyed, mapped and verified the ejido lands. According to several analysts, the privatization of ejidos has undermined the economic base of Indigenous communities.

=== Linguistic ===
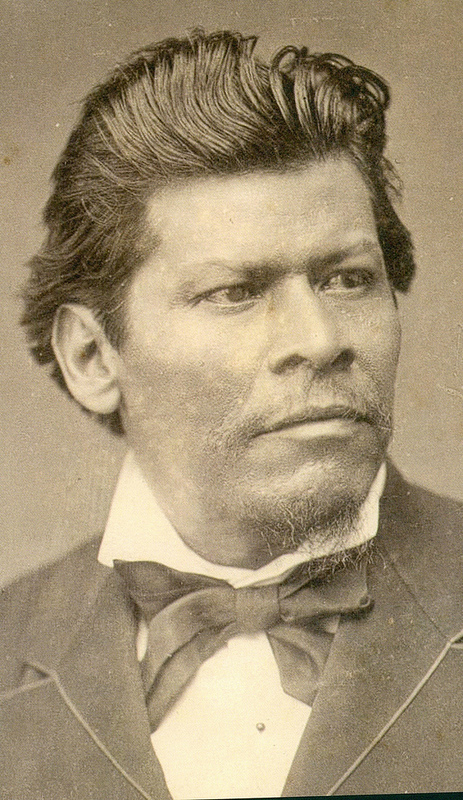
Ignacio Manuel Altamirano Mexican liberal writer, journalist, teacher and politician.

Beginning in the early sixteenth century, mestizaje, the mixing of races and cultures led to the mixing of languages as well. The Spanish Crown proclaimed Spanish to be the language of the empire; Indigenous languages were used during the conversion of individuals to Catholicism. Because of this, Indigenous languages were more widespread than Spanish from 1523 to 1581. During the late sixteenth century, the prevalence of the Spanish language increased.

Indigenous tongues are discriminated against and seen as not modern. By the seventeenth century, the elite minority were Spanish speakers. After independence in 1821, there was a shift to Spanish to legitimize the Mexican Spanish created by Mexican criollos. The nineteenth century brought with it programs to provide bilingual education at primary levels where they would eventually transition to Spanish-only education. Linguistic uniformity was sought out to strengthen national identity. This further excluded Indigenous languages from power structures.

The Chiapas conflict of 1994 led to collaboration between the Mexican government and the Zapatista Army of National Liberation, an Indigenous political group. In 1996, the San Andrés Larráinzar Accords were negotiated between the Zapatista Army of National Liberation and the Mexican government. The San Andrés Accords were the first time the Mexican government acknowledged Indigenous rights. The San Andrés Accords did not explicitly state language, but language was involved in culture and education matters.

In 2001, the second article of the constitution of Mexico was changed to recognize and enforce the right of Indigenous peoples and communities to self-determination and, therefore, their autonomy to preserve and enrich their language, knowledge, and every part of their culture and identity.

In 2003, the General Law of Linguistic Rights of the Indigenous Peoples explicitly stated the protection of Indigenous peoples' individual and collective linguistic rights. The final section also sanctioned the creation of a National Institute for Indigenous Languages (INALI) whose purpose is to promote the growth of Indigenous languages in Mexico.

There has been a lack of enforcement of the law. For example, the General Law on Linguistic Rights of Indigenous People guarantees the right to a trial in the language of Indigenous peoples with someone who understands their culture. According to the Mexican National Human Rights Commission, Mexico has not abided by this law. Examples include Jacinta Francisca Marcial, an Indigenous woman imprisoned for her alleged involvement in a 2006 kidnapping. After three years and the assistance of Amnesty International, she was released for lack of evidence.

Additionally, the General Law on Linguistics also guarantees bilingual and intercultural education. These efforts have been criticized because teachers do not know the Indigenous language or do not prioritize its teaching. In fact, some studies argue that formal education has decreased the prevalence of Indigenous languages. Some parents do not teach their children their Indigenous language, and some children refuse to learn their Indigenous language for fear of discrimination. Scholars argue that there needs to be a social change to elevate the status of Indigenous languages so that the law can be withheld and Indigenous languages protected.

=== Women's ===
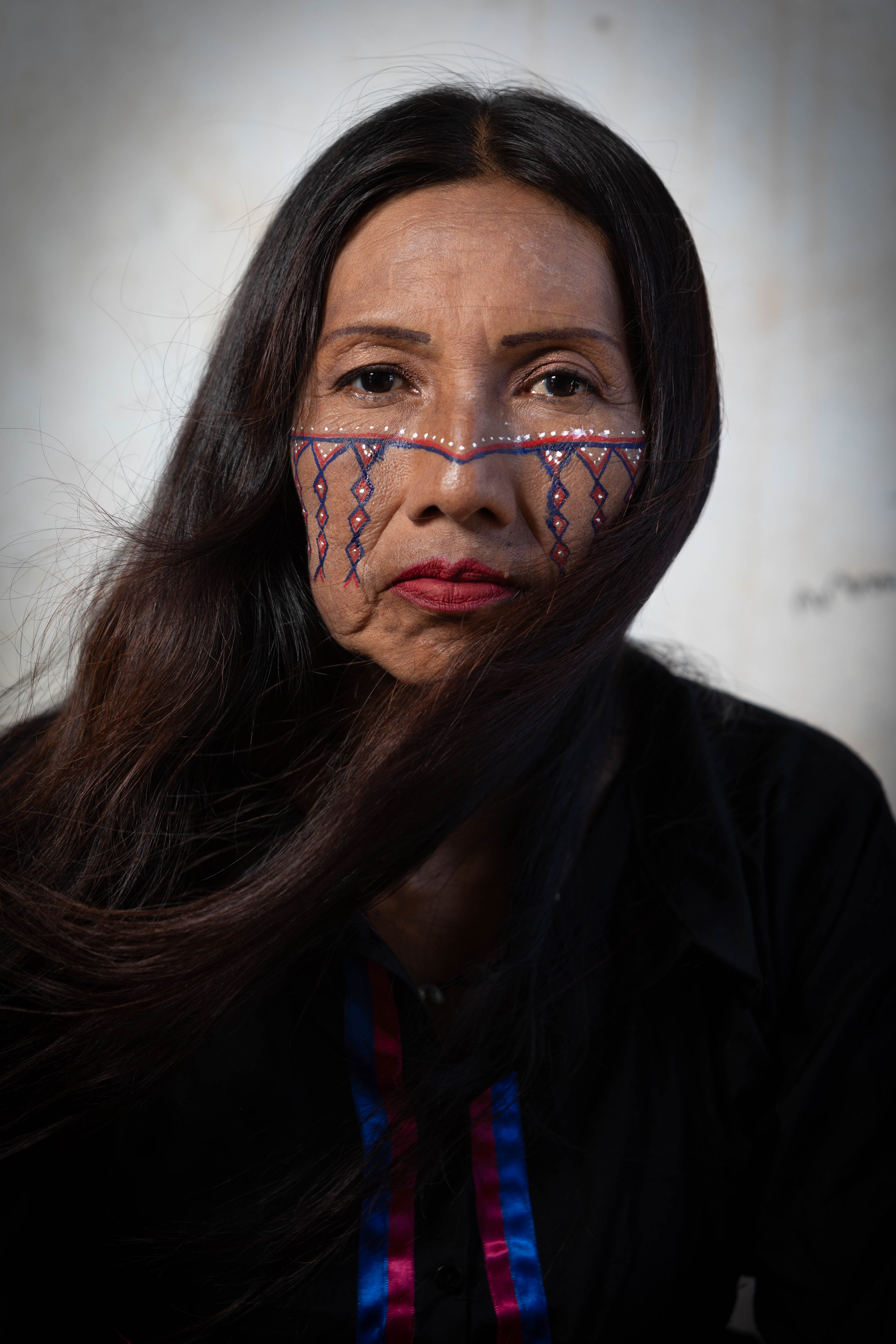
A Seri woman.

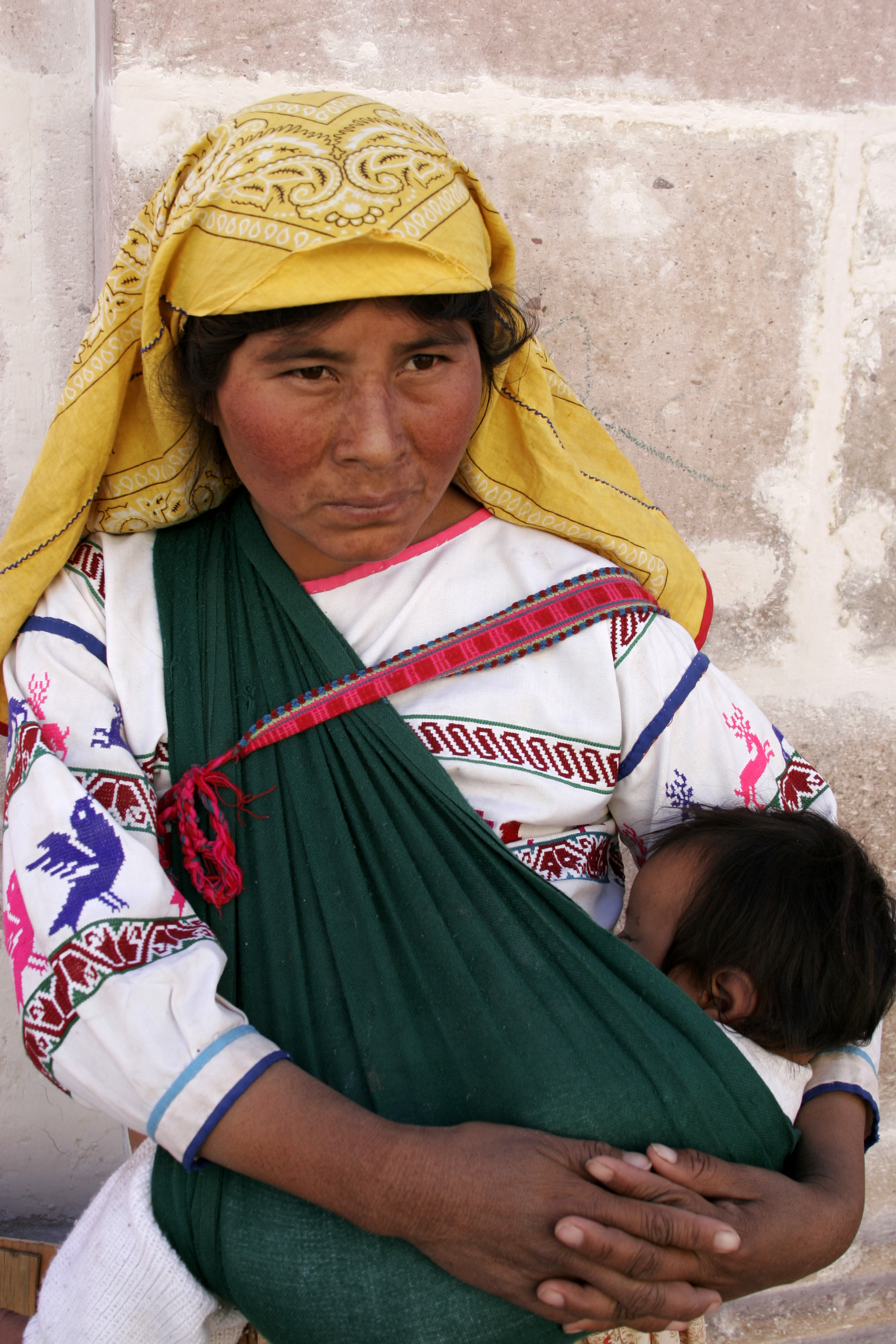
A Huichol mother.

Indigenous women are often taken advantage of because they are women, Indigenous, and usually poor. Indigenous traditions have been used as a pretext by the Mexican government to deny rights to Indigenous women, such as the right to own land. Additionally, violence against women has been regarded by the Mexican government as a cultural practice.

The EZLN accepted a Revolutionary Law for Women on March 8, 1993. The law is not fully enforced but shows solidarity between the Indigenous movement and women. The Mexican government's increased militarization of Indigenous areas has made women more susceptible to harassment through military abuses. The government has remained largely inactive against denunciations of abuse of Indigenous women by elements of the armed forces.

Indigenous women have formed many support organizations to improve their social position and gain financial independence. Indigenous women use national and international legislation to support their claims that go against cultural norms such as domestic violence. Reproductive justice is an important issue to Indigenous communities because there is a lack of development in these areas and is less access to maternal care. Conditional cash transfer programs such as Oportunidades have been used to encourage Indigenous women to seek formal health care.

== Development and socio-economy ==
Generally, Indigenous Mexicans are poorer than non-Indigenous Mexicans, though social development varies between states, different Indigenous ethnicities, and between rural and urban areas. In all states, Indigenous people have higher infant mortality, and in some states, almost double that of the non-Indigenous populations.

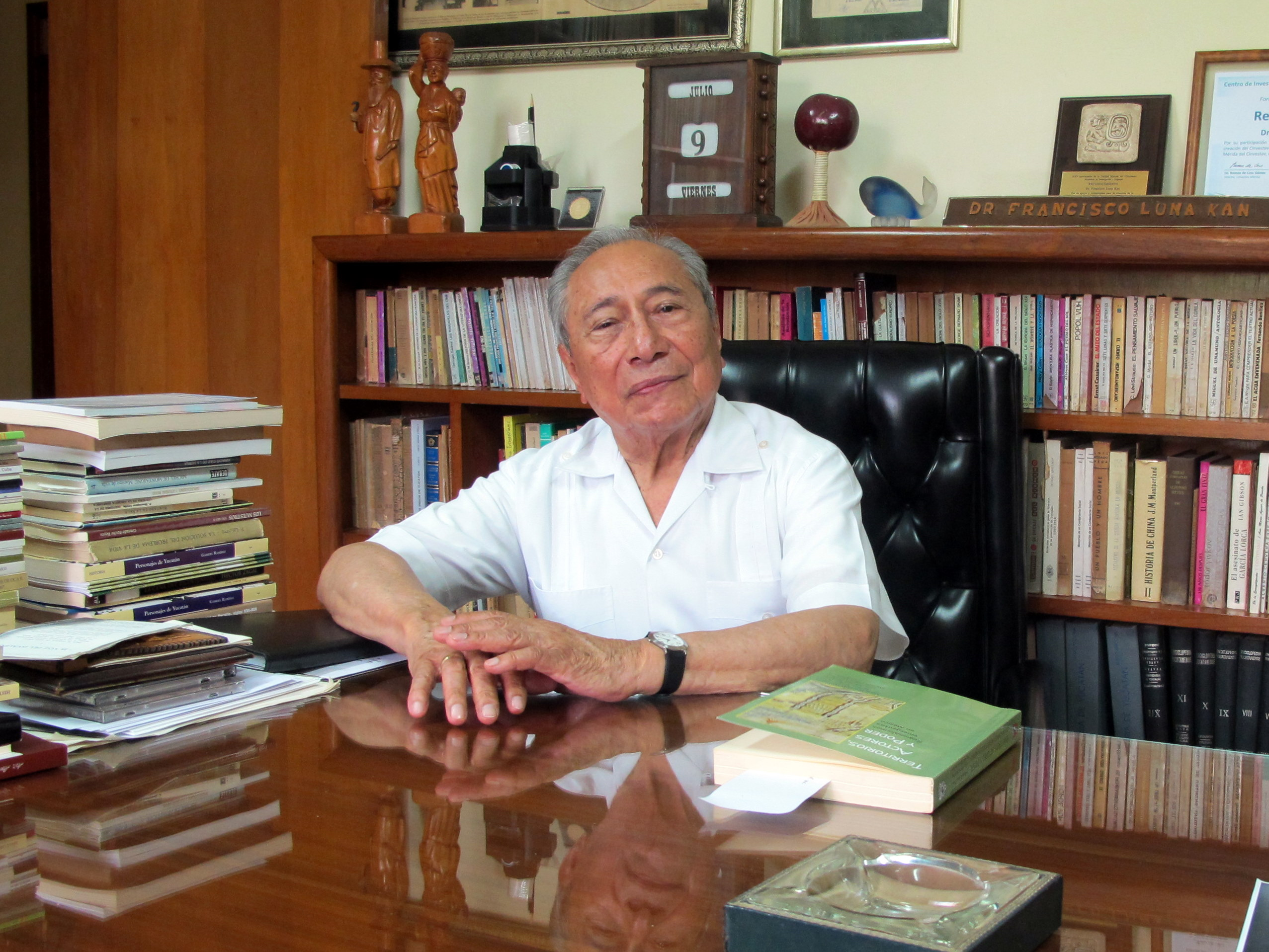
Francisco Luna Kan was governor of the state of Yucatán from 1976 to 1982.

Some Indigenous groups, particularly the Yucatec Maya in the Yucatán Peninsula and some of the Nahua and Otomi peoples in central states have maintained higher levels of development while indigenous peoples in states such as the Guerrero or Michoacán are ranked drastically lower than the average Mexican citizen in these fields.

The Indigenous literacy rates are much lower, particularly in the southwestern states of Guerrero and Oaxaca, due to a lack of education and educational literature available in Indigenous languages. Literacy rates are also much lower, with 27% of Indigenous children between 6 and 14 being illiterate compared to a national average of 12% in 2000. The Mexican government is required to provide education in Indigenous languages but often fails to provide schooling in languages other than Spanish. As a result, many Indigenous groups have resorted to creating their own small community educational institutions.

The Indigenous population participates in the workforce longer than the national average, starting earlier and continuing longer. A major reason for this is that many Indigenous practices subsistence agriculture receive no regular salaries. Indigenous people also have lower access to health care.

== Demographics ==
Native Mexicans 1921–2020
Year	Population	% of Mexico
1921	4,179,449	29.16%
2020	23,232,391	▼19.41%
Source: Mexican census INEGI.

=== Languages ===
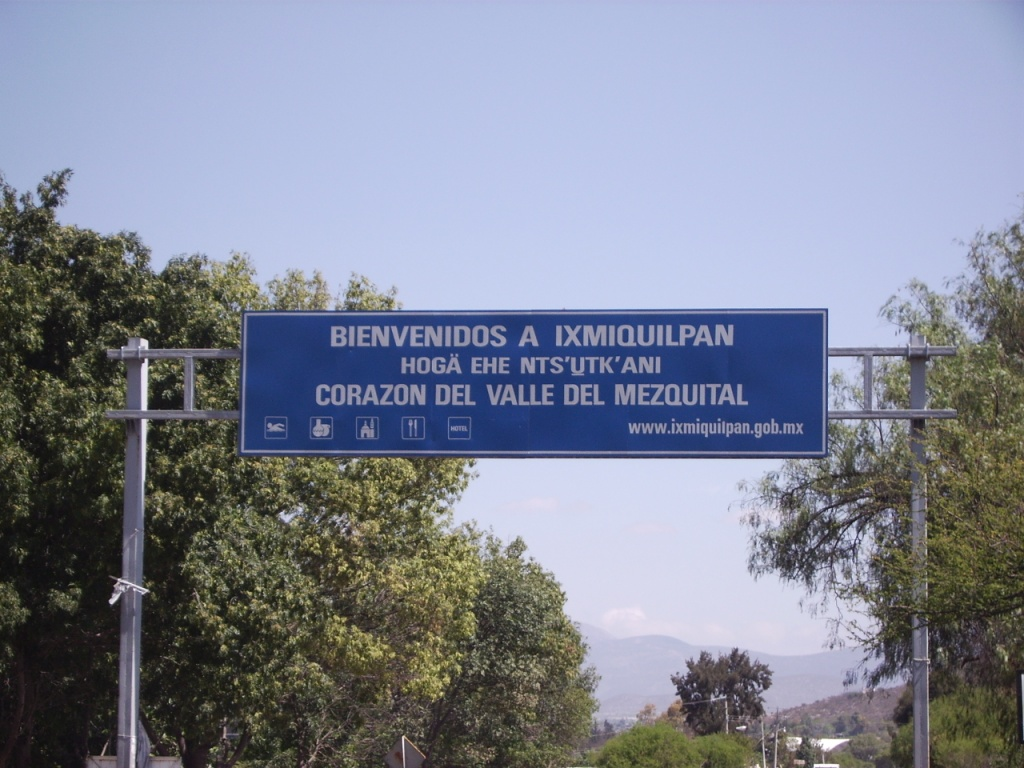
A welcome sign in Ixmiquilpan, Hidalgo, with an Otomi-language message reading Hogä ehe Nts'utk'ani ('Welcome to Ixmiquilpan')

The Law of Linguistic Rights of the Indigenous Languages recognizes 62 Indigenous languages as "national languages" which have the same validity as Spanish in all territories where they are spoken. According to the National Institute of Statistics, Geography and Data Processing (INEGI), approximately 6.7% of the population speaks an Indigenous language. That is, less than half of those identified as Indigenous. 6,695,228 people 5 years or older were tallied as Indigenous-language speakers in the 2010 census, an increase of about 650,000 from the 2000 census. In 2000, 6,044,547 people 5 years or older spoke an Indigenous language.

In previous censuses, information on the Indigenous-speaking population, who were five years of age and older, was obtained from the Mexican people. However, in the 2010 census, this approach was changed, and the Government also began to collect data on people 3 years and older. With this new approach, it was determined that 6,913,362 people three or older spoke an Indigenous language (218,000 children 3 and 4 four years of age fell into this category), accounting for 6.6% of the total population. The population of children aged 0 to 2 years in homes where the head of household or a spouse spoke an Indigenous language was 678 954. The Indigenous language-speaking population has been increasing in absolute numbers for decades but has nonetheless fallen in proportion to the national population.

The recognition of Indigenous languages and the protection of Indigenous cultures is granted not only to the ethnic groups Indigenous to modern-day Mexican territory but also to other North American Indigenous groups that migrated to Mexico from the United States in the nineteenth century and those who immigrated from Guatemala in the 1980s.

==== States ====
The five states with the largest Indigenous-language-speaking populations are:

- Oaxaca, with 1,165,186 Indigenous language speakers, accounting for 34.2% of the state's population.
- Chiapas, with 1,141,499 Indigenous language speakers, accounting for 27.2% of the state's population.
- Veracruz, with 644,559 Indigenous language speakers, accounting for 9.4% of the state's population.
- Puebla, with 601,680 Indigenous language speakers, accounting for 11.7% of the state's population.
- Yucatán, with 537,516 Indigenous language speakers, accounting for 30.3% of the state's population.

These five states accounted for 61.1% of all Indigenous language speakers in Mexico. However, most Indigenous Mexicans do not speak their languages and speak only Spanish, as reflected in their populations. Although Oaxaca, Chiapas, Veracruz, Puebla, and Yucatán have 34.2%, 27.2%, 9.4%, 11.7%, and 30.3% of their populations speaking an Indigenous language, these states' self-identified Indigenous populations are 65.73%, 36.15%, 29.25%, 35.28%, and 65.4%, respectively.

=== Population statistics ===
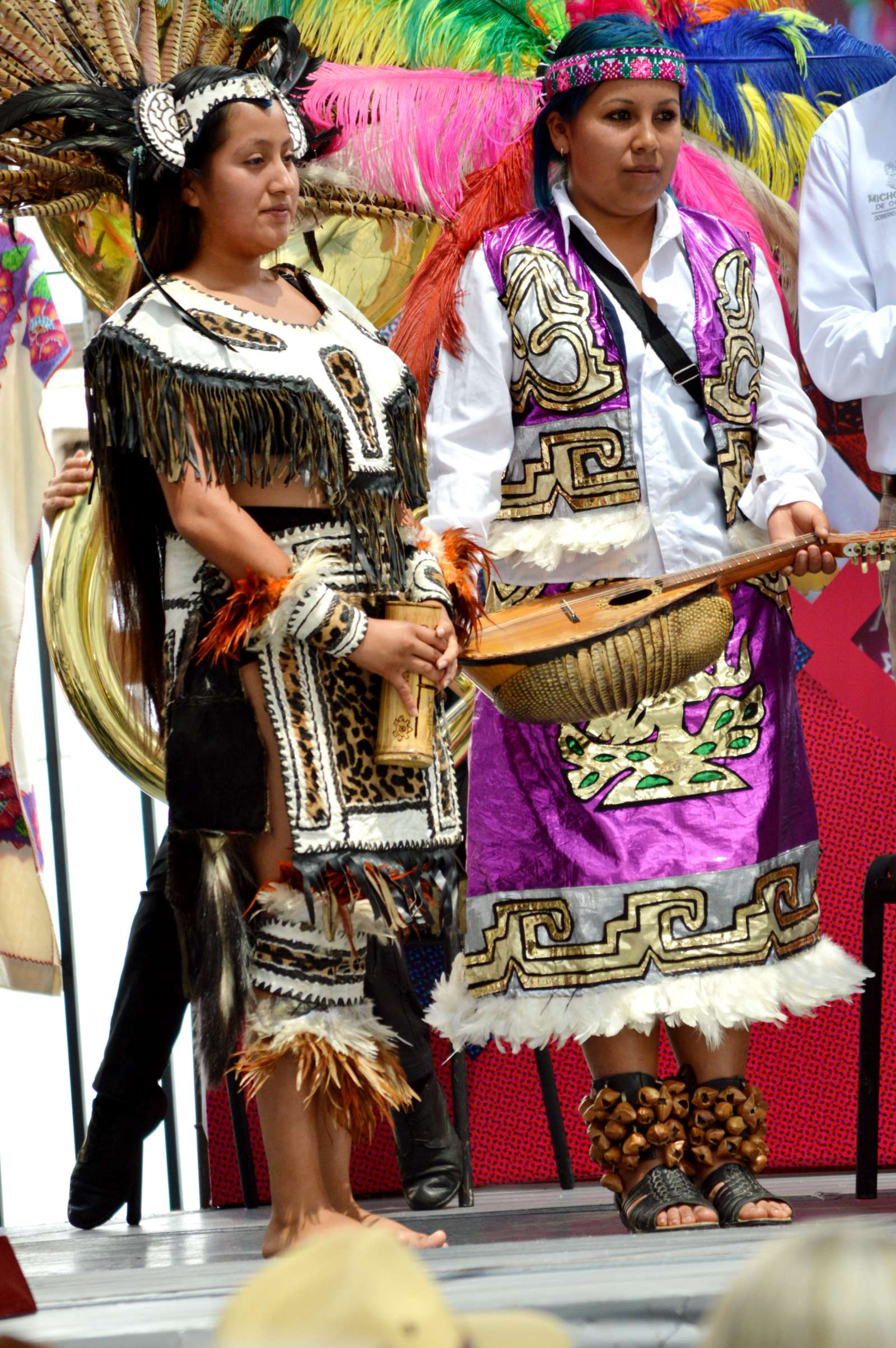
Representatives of the coastal Nahua people of Michoacán at the 2015 Muestra de Indumentaria Tradicional de Ceremonias y Danzas de Michoacán, part of the Tianguis de Domingo de Ramos in Uruapan, Michoacán, Mexico.

In the 2020 census 23,232,391 people were identified as Indigenous based on self-identification (19.41%). This is a significant increase from the 2010 census, in which Indigenous Mexicans accounted for 14.9% of the population and numbered 15,700,000, but smaller than the 2015 census estimate of 25,694,928 (21.5%). Most Indigenous communities have a degree of financial and political autonomy under the legislation of "usos y costumbres," which allows them to regulate internal issues under customary law.

Mexico's Indigenous population has increased in absolute numbers in recent decades, as has the percentage of the population. This is largely due to increased self-identification as Indigenous, as well as Indigenous women having higher birth rates than the national average. Indigenous peoples are also more likely to live in rural areas, but many reside in urban or suburban areas, particularly in the central states of Mexico, Puebla, Tlaxcala, Mexico City and the Yucatán Peninsula.

According to the CDI, the states with the greatest percentage of Indigenous population are: Yucatán, with 65.40%, Quintana Roo with 44.44% and Campeche with 44.54% of the population being Indigenous, most of them Maya; Oaxaca with 65.73% of the population, the most numerous groups being the Mixtec and Zapotec peoples; Chiapas has 36.15%, the majority being Tzeltal and Tzotzil Maya; Hidalgo with 36.21%, the majority being Otomi; Puebla with 35.28%, and Guerrero with 33.92%, mostly Nahua people and the states of San Luis Potosí and Veracruz both home to a population of 19% Indigenous people, mostly from the Totonac, Nahua and Teenek (Huastec) groups.

=== States ===
Map of Mexican states by percentage Indigenous language speaking (2015).

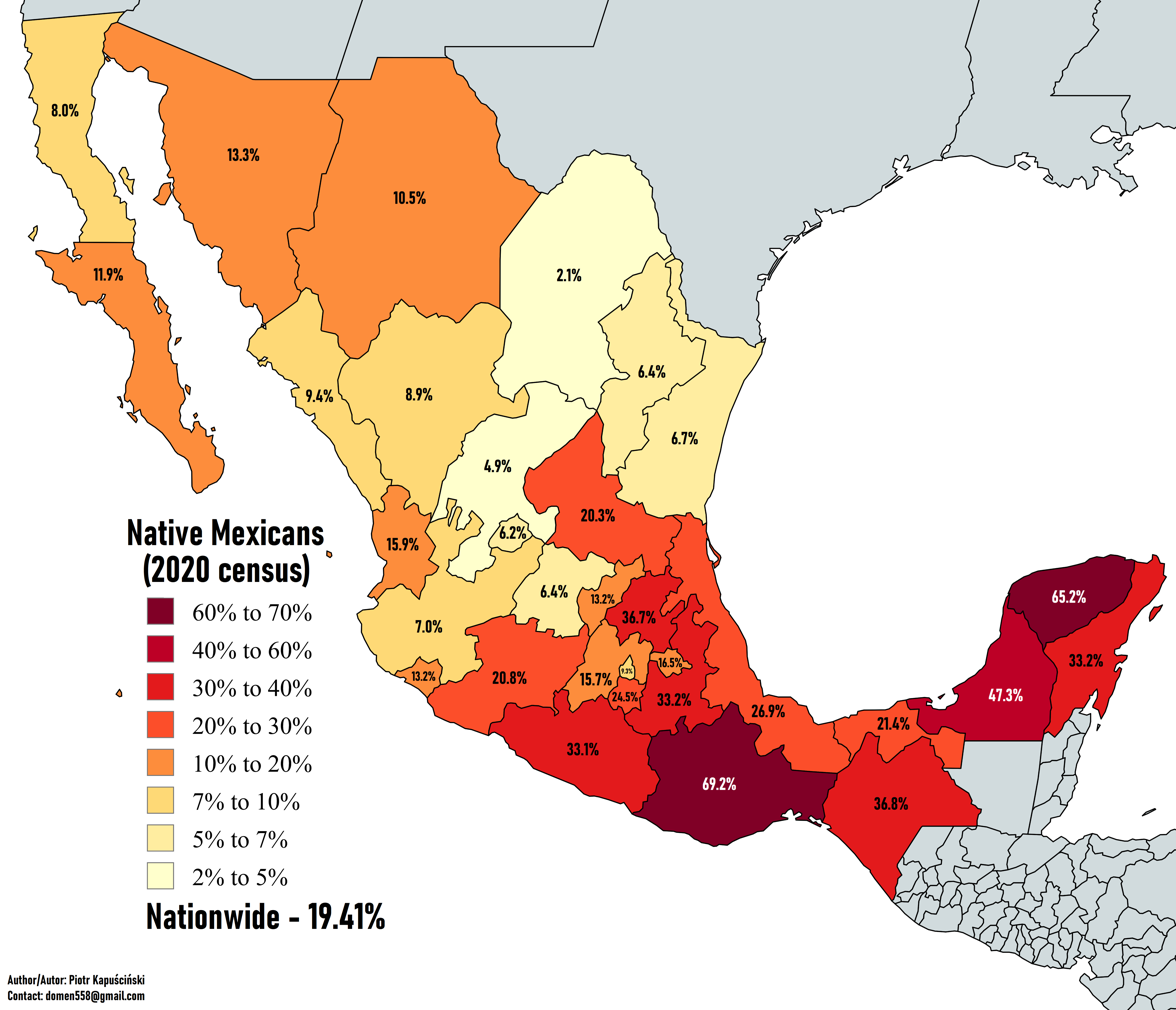
Mexican states by percentage of people who identify as indigenous in 2020

Most of the Indigenous population is concentrated in the central and southern states. According to the CDI, the states with the greatest percentage of Indigenous population as of 2020 according to INEGI are:

Rank	State	Percent indigenous (2020)	Percent speaking an indigenous language
1	Oaxaca	69.18%	31.2%
2	Yucatán	65.18%	23.7%
3	Campeche	47.26%	10.4%
4	Chiapas	36.79%	28.2%
5	Hidalgo	36.65%	12.3%
6	Quintana Roo	33.23%	11.7%
7	Puebla	33.22%	9.9%
8	Guerrero	33.14%	15.5%
9	Veracruz	26.90%	8.6%
10	Morelos	24.55%	2.0%
11	Tabasco	21.36%	4.0%
12	Michoacán	20.75%	3.4%
13	San Luis Potosí	20.33%	8.6%
-	Mexico	19.41%	6.2%
14	Tlaxcala	16.46%	2.2%
15	Nayarit	15.94%	5.9%
16	México	15.75%	2.6%
17	Sonora	13.31%	2.2%
18	Colima	13.17%	0.8%
19	Querétaro	13.15%	1.4%
20	Baja California Sur	11.87%	1.8%
21	Chihuahua	10.48%	3.1%
22	Sinaloa	9.35%	1.4%
23	Ciudad de México	9.28%	1.5%
24	Durango	8.87%	2.7%
25	Baja California	7.97%	1.4%
26	Jalisco	7.04%	1.2%
27	Tamaulipas	6.67%	0.7%
28	Nuevo León	6.40%	1.4%
29	Guanajuato	6.39%	0.3%
30	Aguascalientes	6.17%	0.2%
31	Zacatecas	4.88%	0.7%
32	Coahuila	2.13%	0.2%

=== Population genetics ===
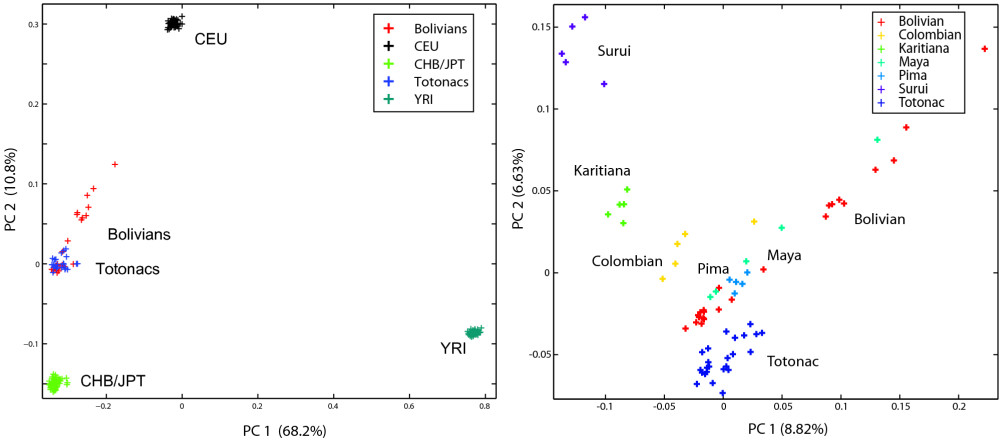
Principal components plot of individual pairwise genetic distance estimates. Panel 1 – most New World Native American and Hispanic individuals are clustered and have smaller estimated distances to the HapMap CHB/JPT than to the CEU or YRI (~815 K SNPs).

The indigenous Mexicans (and other 'Amerindian' or 'Native American' peoples) originated from a lineage that diverged from Ancient East Asians around 36,000 years ago and subsequently merged with a Paleolithic Siberian population known as Ancient North Eurasians. This newly formed population gave rise to Paleosiberian peoples, which stayed in Siberia and Ancestral Amerindians which populated the Americas.

In 2011, a large-scale mitochondrial sequencing in Mexican Americans revealed that 85 to 90% of maternal mtDNA lineages are of Native American origin, with the remainder having European (5–7%) or African ancestry (3–5%). Thus, the observed frequency of Native American mtDNA in Mexican/Mexican Americans is higher than was expected based on autosomal estimates of Native American admixture for these populations, i.e., ~ 30–46%.

The Indigenous groups within what is now Mexico are genetically distinct from each other. The genetic differences between geographically separated Indigenous groups (e.g., between Indigenous people living in the Yucatán Peninsula compared to Indigenous people living in western Mexico) can be as large as the genetic differences seen between a European and an East Asian person.

=== Populations of more than 100,000 ===
Indigenous Peoples of Mexico
Group	Population	Speakers (Note: Number of indigenous peoples that still speak their Indigenous language)
Nahuas	2,445,969	1,659,029
(Yucatec) Maya (Maya'wiinik)	1,475,575	892,723
Zapotec (Binizaa)	777,253	505,992
Mixtec (Ñuù savi)	726,601	510,801
Otomi (Hñähñü)	646,875	327,319
Totonac (Tachiwin)	411,266	271,847
Tzotzil (Sotz'leb)	406,962	356,349
Tzeltal (K'op o winik atel)	384,074	336,448
Mazahua (Hñatho)	326,660	151,897
Mazatec (Ha shuta enima)	305,836	246,198
Huastec (Téenek)	296,447	173,233
Ch'ol (Winik)	220,978	189,599
Chinantec (Tsa jujmí)	201,201	152,711
Purépecha (P'urhépecha)	202,884	136,388
Mixe (Ayüükjä'äy)	168,935	135,316
Tlapanec (Me'phaa)	140,254	119,497
Rarámuri (Tarahumara)	121,835	87,721

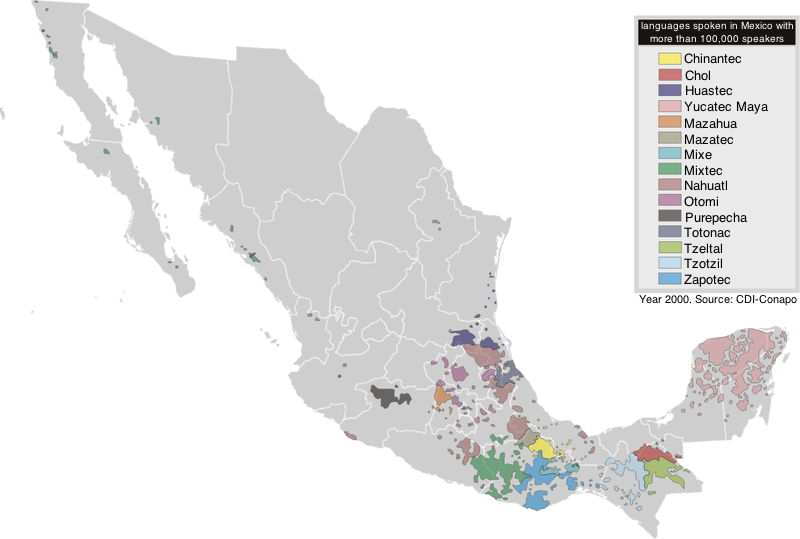
Indigenous groups and languages of Mexico, only including groups with more than 100,000 speakers of a native language.

=== Populations between 20,000 and 100,000 ===
Indigenous Peoples of Mexico
Group	Population	Speakers
Mayo (Yoreme)	91,261	60,093
Zoque (O'de püt)	86,589	34,770
Chontal Maya (Yokot)	79,438	43,850
Popoluca (Tuncápxe)	62,306	44,237
Chatino (Cha'cña)	60,003	47,762
Amuzgo (Tzañcue)	57,666	48,843
Tojolabal (Tojolwinik)	54,505	44,531
Huichol (Wixárika)	43,929	36,856
Tepehuan (O'dam, Audam, and Ódami)	37,548	30,339
Triqui (Tinujéi)	29,018	24,491
Popoloca	26,249	18,926
Cora (Nayeeri)	24,390	19,512
Mame (Qyool)	23,812	8,739
Yaqui (Yoeme)	23,411	15,053
Cuicatec (Nduudu yu)	22,984	15,078
Huave (Ikoods)	20,528	16,135

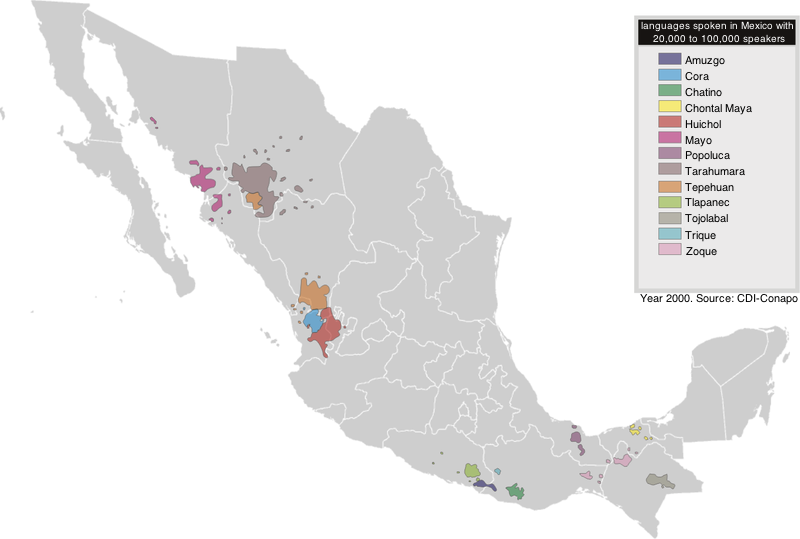
Indigenous groups and languages of Mexico. Displaying groups with more than 20,000 and less than 100,000 speakers of a native language.

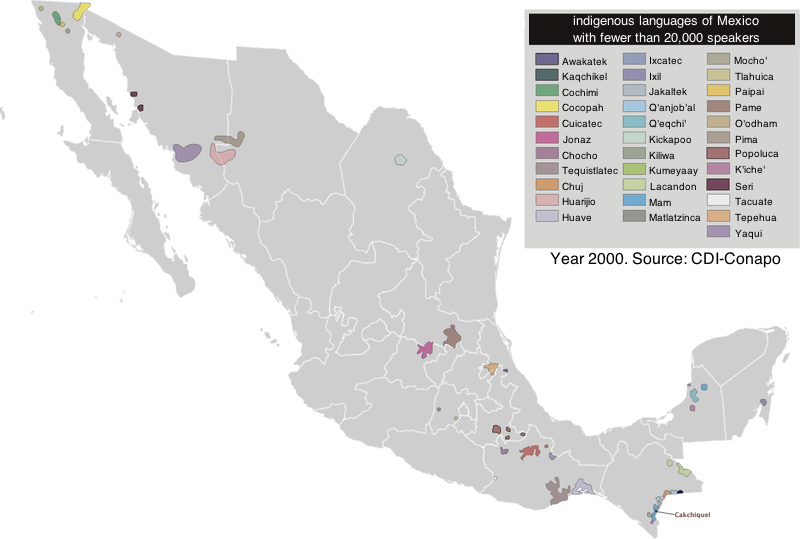
Indigenous groups and languages of Mexico. Displaying groups with less than 20,000 speakers of a native language.

=== Populations of less than 20,000 ===
Indigenous Languages of Mexico
Group	Population	Speakers
Tepehua (Hamasipini)	16,051	10,625
Kanjobal (K'anjobal)	12,974	10,833
Chontal of Oaxaca (Slijuala sihanuk)	12,663	5,534
Pame (Xigüe)	12,572	9,768
Chichimeca Jonaz (Uza)	3,169	1,987
Huarijio (Makurawe)	2,844	1,905
Chuj	2,719	2,143
Chocho (Runixa ngiigua)	2,592	1,078
Tacuate	2,379	2,067
Mexicanero (Mexikatlajtolli)	2,296	1,300
Ocuiltec (Tlahuica)	1,759	522
Pima Bajo	1,540	836
Jacaltec (Abxubal)	1,478	584
Kekchí (K'ekchí)	987	835
Lacandon (Hach t'an)	896	731
Ixcatec	816	406
Seri (Comcáac)	716	518
K'iche' (Quiché, Q'iché)	524	286
Motocintleco (Qatok)	692	186
Kaqchikel (K'akchikel)	675	230
Paipai (Akwa'ala)	418	221
Tohono O'odham (Papago)	363	153
Cocopah (Es péi)	344	206
Kumiai (Ti'pai)	328	185
Kikapú (Kikapooa)	251	144
Cochimi (Laymón, mti'pá)	226	96
Ixil	224	108
Kiliwa (Ko'lew)	107	55
Aguacatec	59	27
Other groups (Note: Includes Opata, Soltec and Papabuco)	728	337

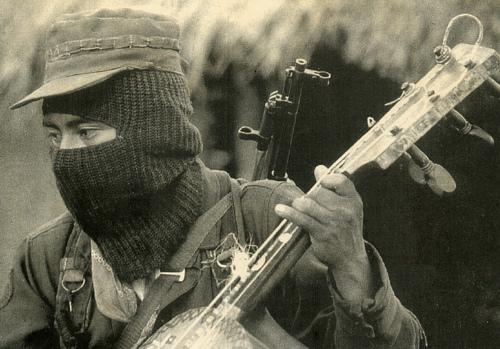
Zapatista Army of National Liberation (EZLN), a revolutionary Indigenous autonomist organization based in the southern Mexican state of Chiapas.

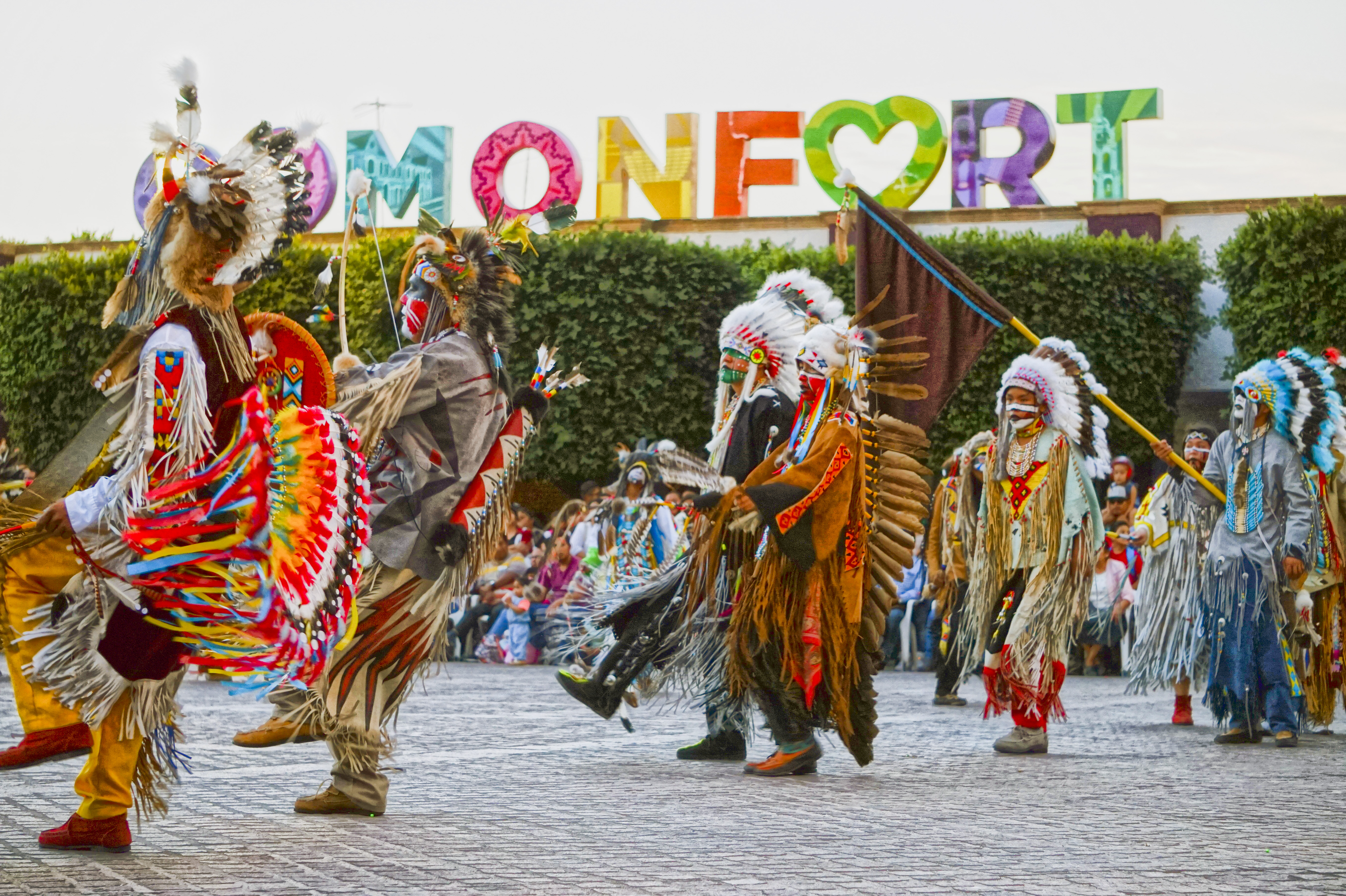
Kickapoo dance in Comonfort, Guanajuato.

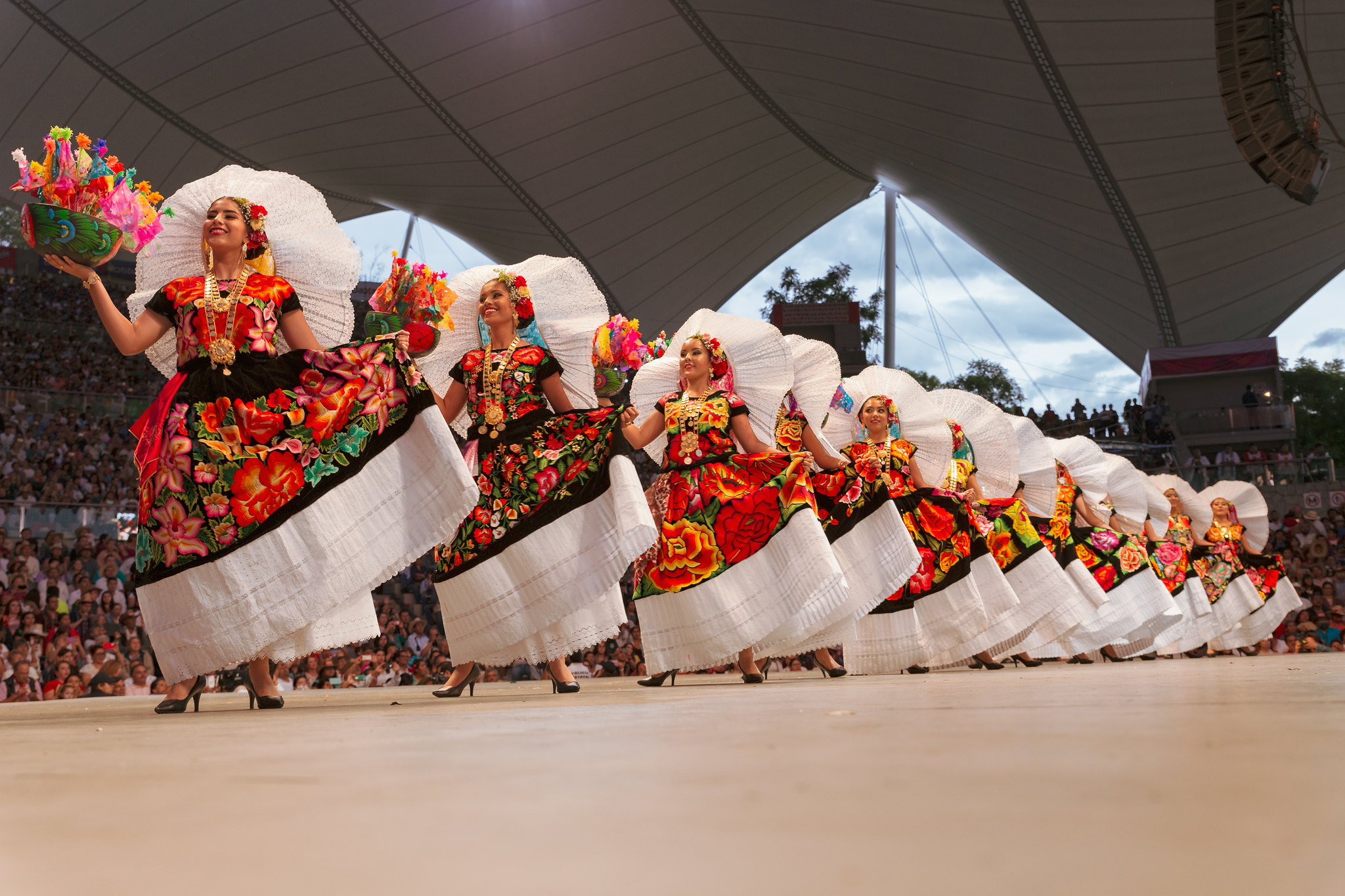
Women dancing in Tehuana costume (costume of the Zapotec ethnic group that inhabit the Isthmus of Tehuantepec) in the Guelaguetza in Oaxaca.

== Education ==
Mexico is the nation of the Americas with the highest number of living languages in the early years of the 21st century; despite this cultural wealth, there is a technological disparity in education for Indigenous peoples compared to other ethnic groups living in the country.

== Culture ==
The anthropologist and chef Raquel Torres Cerdán has recorded and ensured the preservation of many of the Indigenous cuisines of Veracruz.

Conchero dancers in San Miguel de Allende, in March 2026

The Concheros dance, also known as the dance of the Chichimecas, Aztecas and Mexicas, is an important traditional dance and ceremony which has been performed in various parts of Mexico since early in the colonial period. It presents syncretic features of both pre-Hispanic and Christian cultures.

For example, each year, in San Miguel de Allende, concheros or “Chichimeca” dancers from nearby towns dance to drums in pre-Hispanic regalia, on the first Thursday and Friday of March, The event is in honor of “Christ of the Conquest”. This Christ is an ancient statue created of corn stalks and orchid bulbs. One source states that the festivities "represent the acceptance of Christ by the indigenous peoples ... a way of preserving indigenous heritage after the Catholic conquest in Mexico".

== See also ==
- Colonial Mexico
- Indigenismo in Mexico
- Mesoamerica
- Mesoamerican chronology
- Mexican Indian Wars
