= Indias de Oaxaca =

Painting by Felipe Santiago Gutiérrez

- Oaxaca Indians (English)
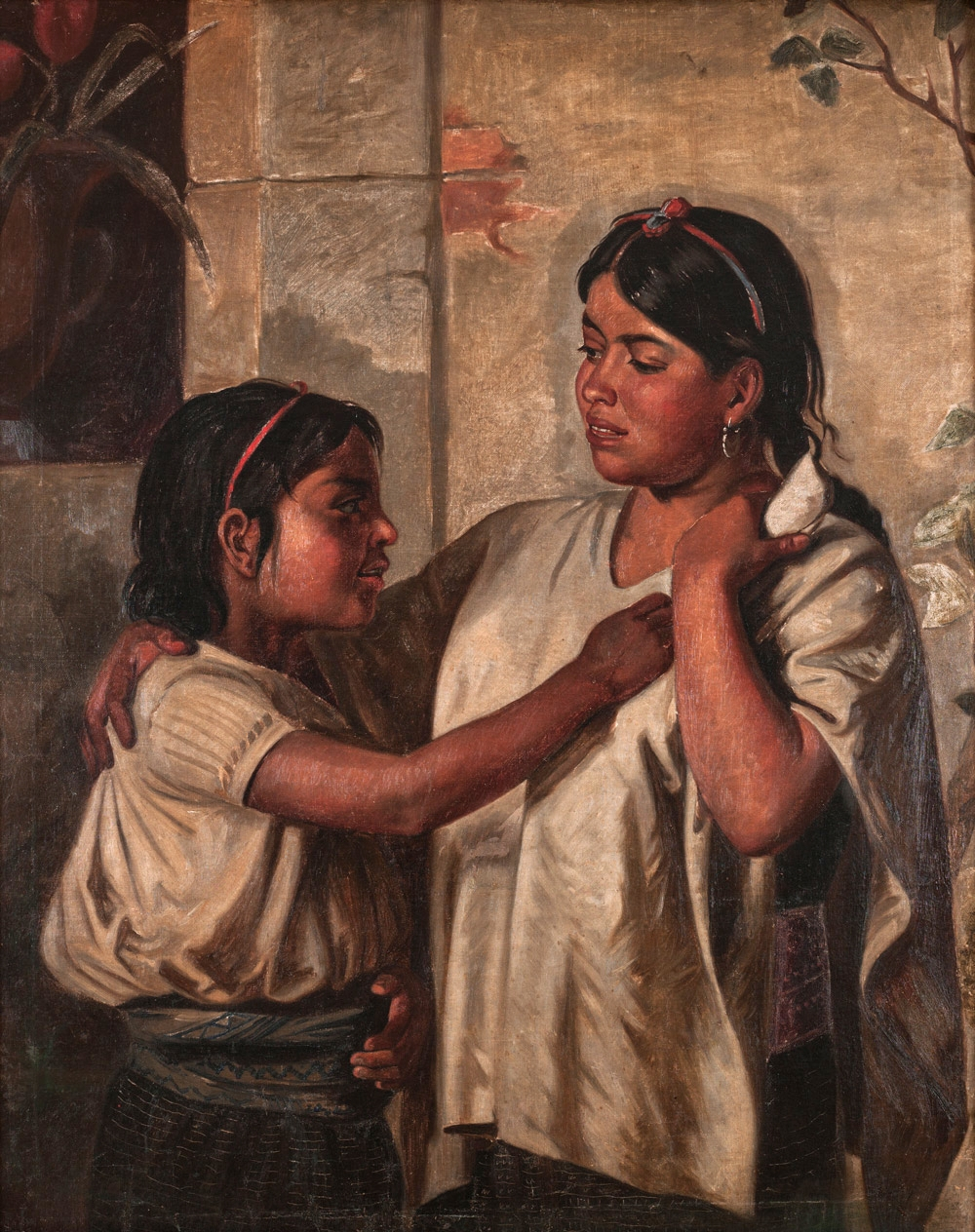
- Artist: Felipe Santiago Gutiérrez
- Year: c. 1877
- Catalogue: AP1125
- Medium: Oil on canvas
- Movement: Costumbrismo; Realism
- Dimensions: 100 cm × 80 cm (39 in × 31 in)
- Location: Miguel Urrutia Art Museum, Bogotá D.C.
- Owner: Banco de la República
- Accession: 1980

Indias de Oaxaca (English: Oaxaca Indians) is an oil-on-canvas painting by Mexican painter Felipe Santiago Gutiérrez, painted c. 1877. It is held in the collection of the Bank of the Republic and exhibited at the Miguel Urrutia Art Museum, in Bogotá.

== Description ==
Indias de Oaxaca portrays two young Mexican indigenous women from Oaxaca playfully disputing over a single piece of tortilla, itself a staple of Mesoamerican and Mexican cuisine. The women appear to be dressed in typical attire worn by the indigenous people Casta in 18th and 19th-century Mexico. Felipe Gutierrez places the scene in an outdoor venue, most likely on a street next to a house of precarious conditions, alluding to the subjects partaking in an economic activity related to antojitos.

== Historical information ==
Felipe Santiago Gutierrez, by invitation of Colombian poet Rafael Pombo, first arrived in Colombia on 21 September to help establish an art school in Bogotá which Pombo hoped for Gutierrez to direct. This project, however, did not materialize. Gutierrez returned to Colombia on 2 October 1880 and, on this occasion, he was present for the establishment of the Escuela de Pintura Gutiérrez which was named in his honor. While he did not get to direct an art school in Colombia, he was able to display some of his paintings and draw portraits of Colombia's upper class society. Per accounts of art historian Beatriz González, Felipe Santiago Gutierrez brought to Colombia the costumbrismo movement which she defined as taking average subjects and dignifying them through art. In 1880, after Santiago Gutierrez held an exhibit on Mexican art in Bogotá, art critic Ellis de Mansfield highlighted Indias de Oaxaca as an exemplary work of the realist movement and honored Felipe Santiago Gutierrez as the best artist of his time.

== Exhibitions ==
Between 12 September 2017 and 14 January 2018, the painting was exhibited at the Museo Nacional de Arte, in Mexico City, during the temporary exhibition Discursos de la piel alongside other works by Felipe Gutiérrez and other international artists.

== Provenance ==
Indias de Oaxaca originally belonged to Colombian painter and sculptor Dionisio Cortés Mesa, himself an alumnus of Felipe Santiago Gutiérrez, and was inherited by family members of the artist across multiple generations. The painting was accessioned to the art collection of the Banco de la República in 1980 under registry number AP1125.

== Bibliography ==
- Jaramillo Agudelo, Darío. (2021). One Hundred Treasures from the Museo de Arte Miguel Urrutia. Bogotá: Banco de la República de Colombia. ISBN 978-958-664-428-0
