= Felipe Santiago Gutiérrez =

Mexican painter (1824–1904)

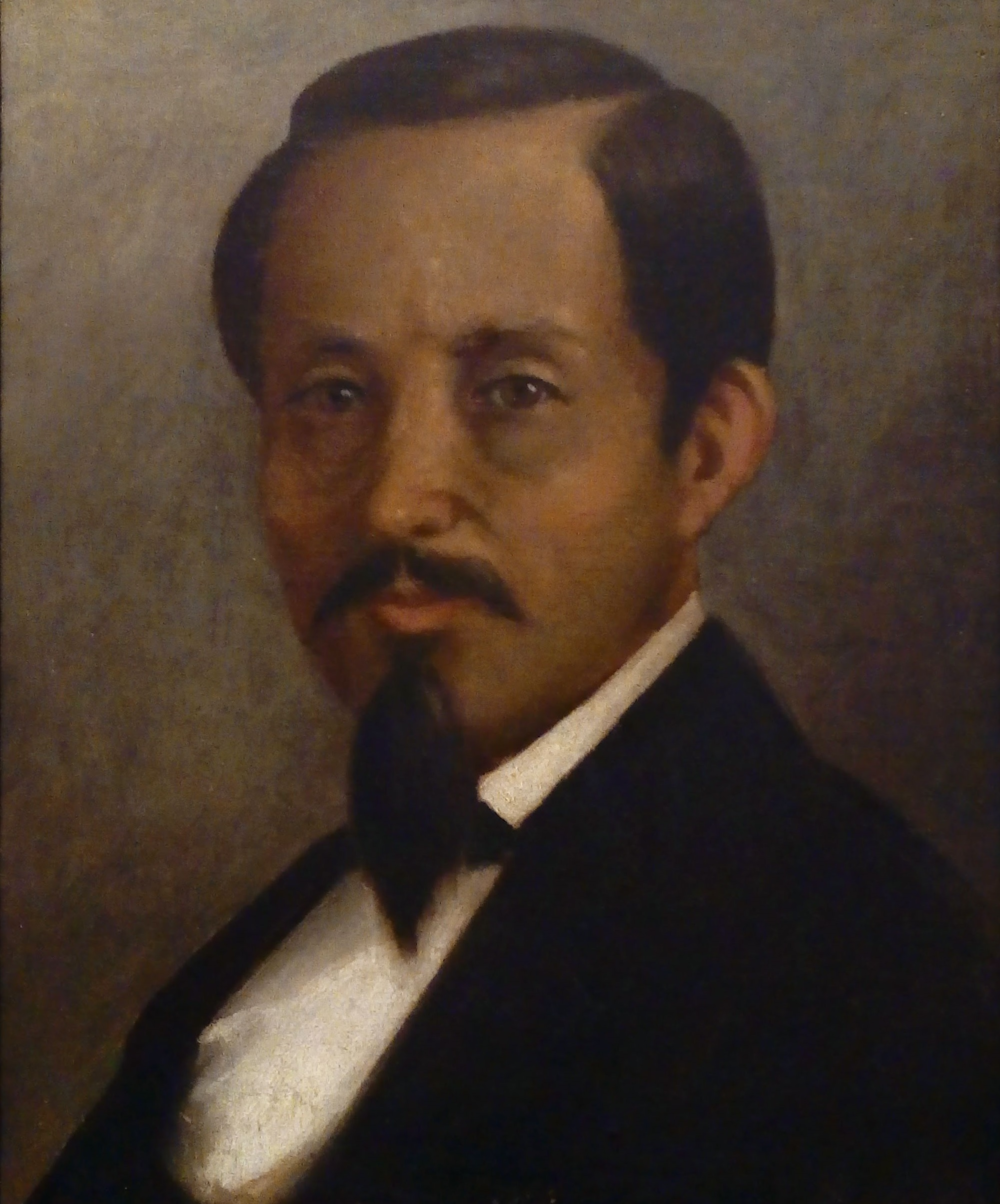
- Self-portrait (c. 1852)
- Born: 20 May 1824; Texcoco, State of Mexico, Mexico
- Died: 4 April 1904 (aged 79); Texcoco, State of Mexico, Mexico
- Known for: Painting
- Notable work: Indias de Oaxaca
- Movement: Costumbrismo; Realism

Felipe Santiago Gutiérrez (20 May 1824, Texcoco - 4 April 1904, Texcoco) was a Mexican painter, known primarily for portraits. He also worked in Colombia, for twenty years.

== Life and career ==
After completing his primary education in his hometown, in 1836, he enrolled at the Academia de San Carlos in Mexico City, where he studied with the Catalonian painter Pelegrí Clavé. From 1848, he was a resident of Toluca. Between 1848 and 1854 he travelled throughout the countryside as a teacher for the Literary Institute (now the Autonomous University of Mexico State).

Later, he embarked on several study trips; notably to the United States (1868-1872), followed by Rome, Paris, Madrid (where he worked briefly with Federico de Madrazo), Barcelona, Florence and others. In 1873, he visited New York, where he met the Colombian writer and diplomat, Rafael Pombo, who invited him to Bogotá, where he stayed for many years. While there, in 1886, he helped to create the National School of Fine Arts. While in Paris, he had studied nude painting and, in 1891, when his "Huntress of the Andes" was displayed in Mexico, it created a small scandal.

He returned to his hometown in 1894 and died there in 1904.

In December 1992, the Museo Felipe Santiago Gutiérrez opened in Toluca. It contains 225 works by Gutiérrez and his followers; arranged by themes. It shares space with a museum devoted to José María Velasco Gómez. His works may also be seen at several museums in Bogotá, as well as the Museo Nacional de Arte.

== Selected paintings ==
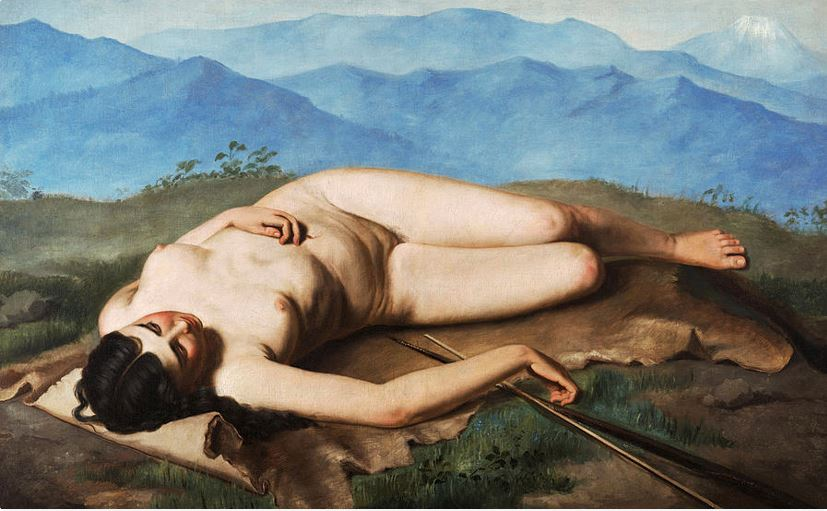
La Cazadora de los Andes, 1874, oil on canvas, Colección Blaisten, Mexico City

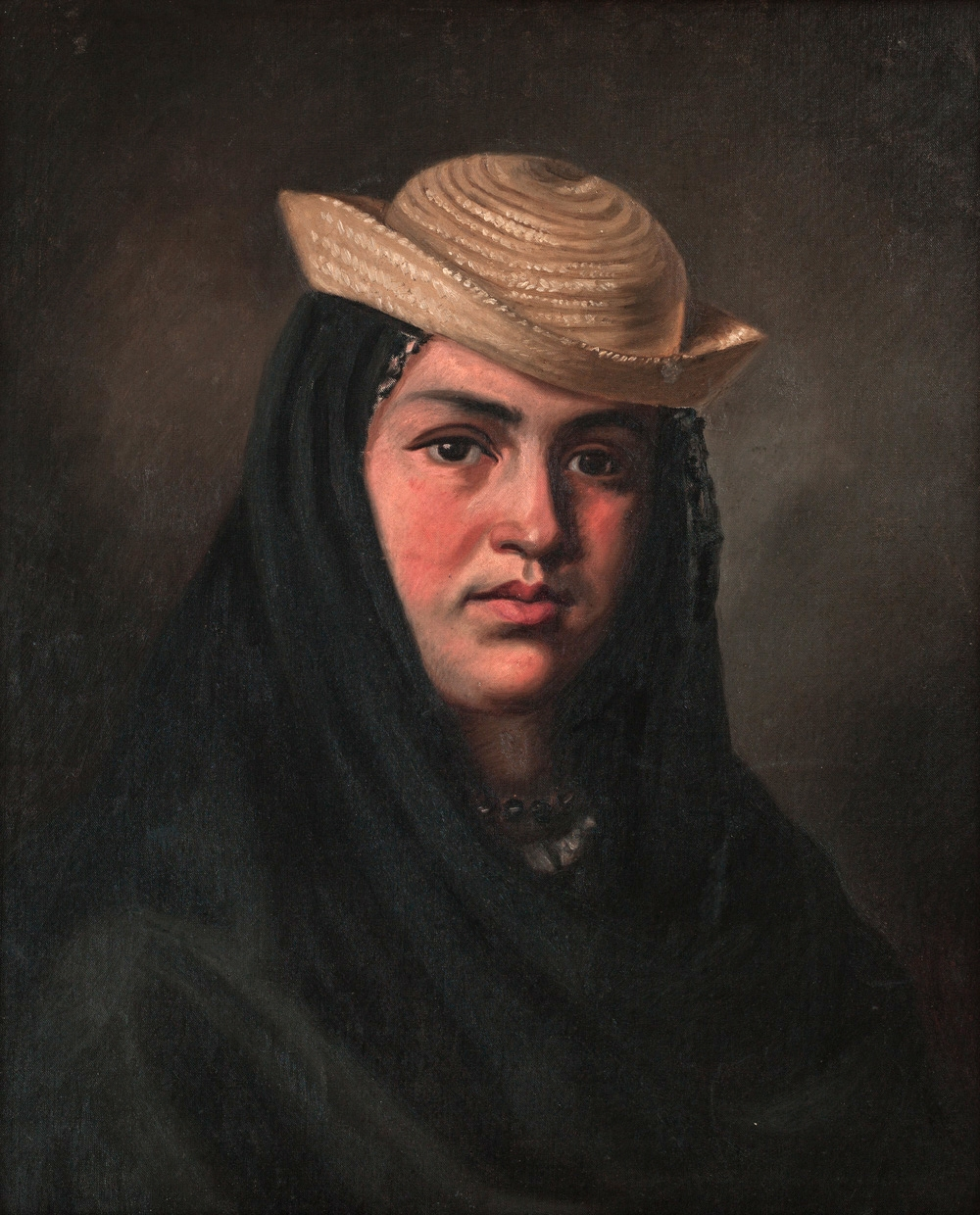
La Corrosca, 1875, oil on canvas, Miguel Urrutia Art Museum, Bogotá

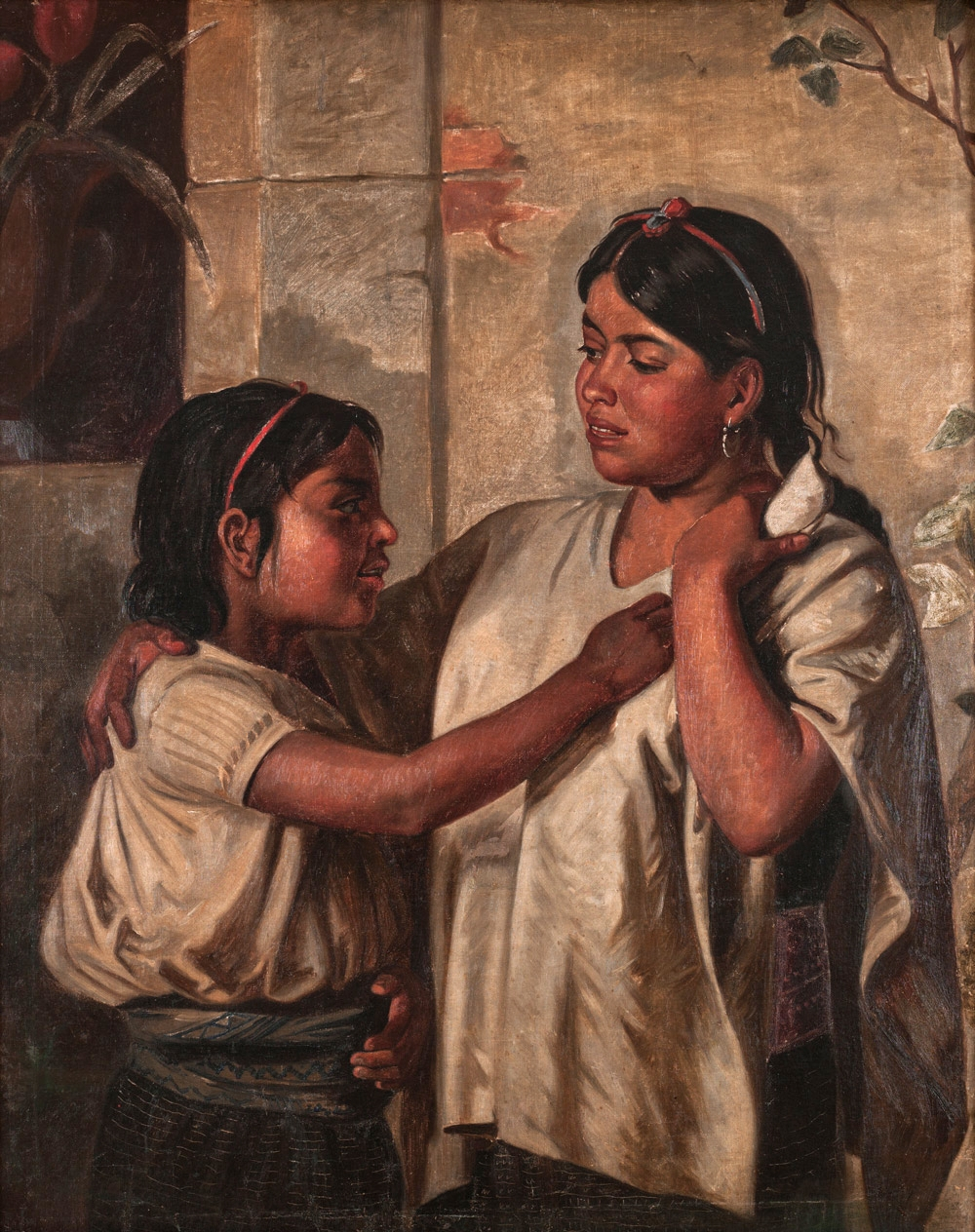
Indias de Oaxaca, c. 1877, oil on canvas, Miguel Urrutia Art Museum, Bogotá

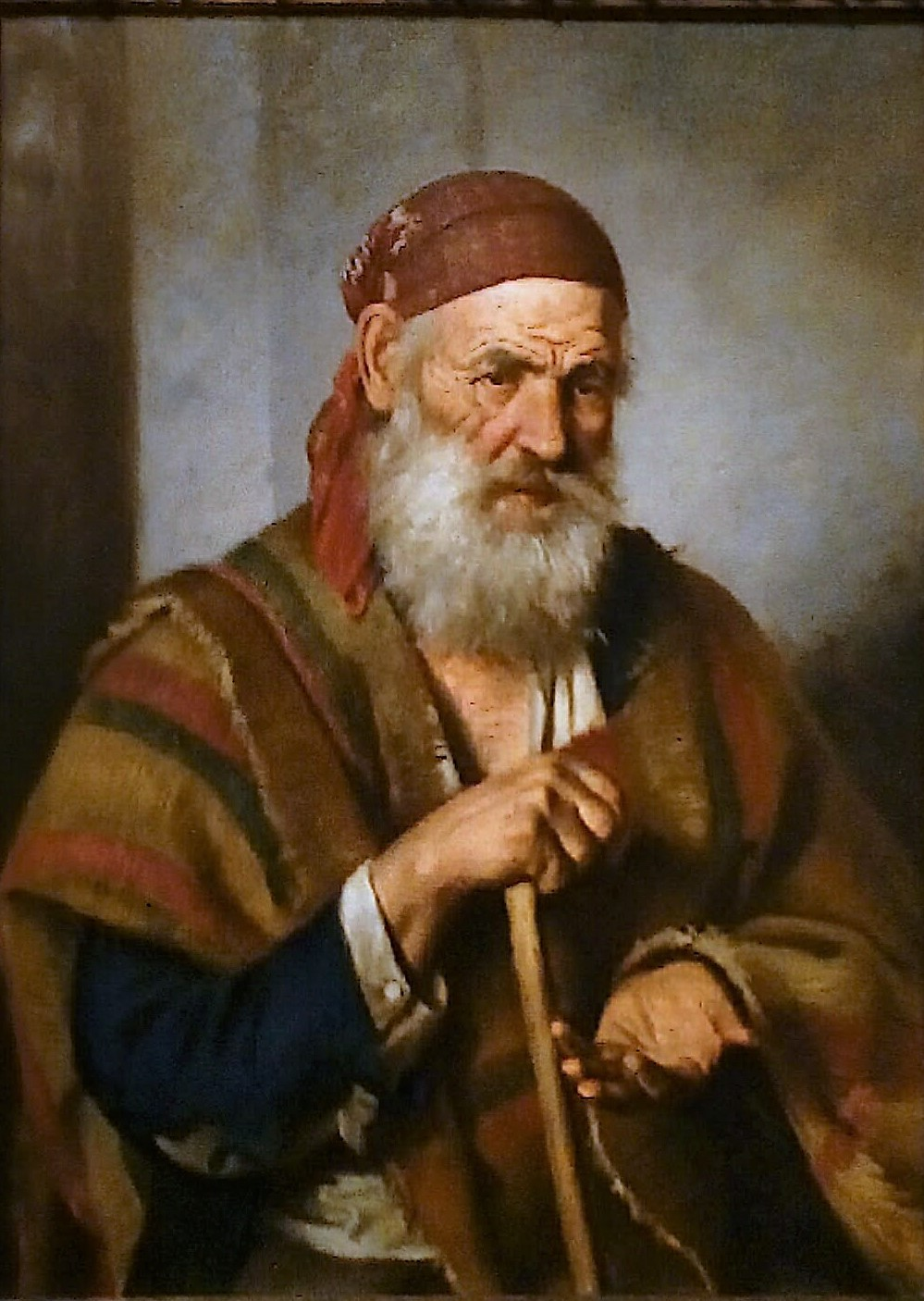
El mendigo, c. 1891, National Museum of Colombia, Bogotá
