= 2010–11 Liga Mexicana Élite season =

The 2010-11 Liga Mexicana Élite season was the first season of the new semi-professional ice hockey league in Mexico. Prior to 2010-11, there had only been a national championship held at the end of the year.

== Regular season ==
	Club	GP	W	SOW	SOL	L	GF–GA	Pts
1.	Mayan Astronomers	12	7	0	3	2	53:36	24
2.	Aztec Eagle Warriors	12	7	1	0	4	33:24	23
3.	Teotihuacan Priests	12	3	1	2	6	32:41	13
4.	Zapotec Totems	12	2	3	0	7	27:44	12

== Playoffs ==
=== Semifinals ===
- Aztec Eagle Warriors - Teotihuacan Priests 0:2 (1:5, 1:2 OT)

=== Final ===
- Mayan Astronomers - Teotihuacan Priests 1:2 (0:5, 5:4, 1:2)
