= Olmec Stone Heads =

Ice hockey team in Mexico City

- City: Mexico City, Mexico
- League: Liga Mexicana Élite
- Founded: 2017
- Home arena: Centro Santa Fe
- Colors: Lime green and black
- General manager: (Mexico) Alejandro de la O
- Head coach: (Mexico) Diego de la Garma
Home colours

The Olmec Stone Heads are a semi-professional ice hockey team in Mexico City, Mexico. They play in the Liga Mexicana Élite.

== History ==
The club was founded in 2017 as one of the charter members of the Liga Mexicana Élite, alongside Aztec Eagle Warriors, Mayan Astronomers and Teotihuacan Priests, that started in October 2017.

The team took its name from the Olmecs, a Mesoamerican civilization, known for their stone colossal heads, hence the name.

== Season-by-season record ==
Season	GP	W	W(OT)	T	L(OT)	L	GF	GA	Finish	Playoffs
2017–18	12	3	1	0	0	8	31	41	4th/4	DNQ
2019–20	12	7	0	0	3	2	28	21	1st/4	Season cancelled
