= Metepec railway station =

Commuter rail station in the State of Mexico

Metepec
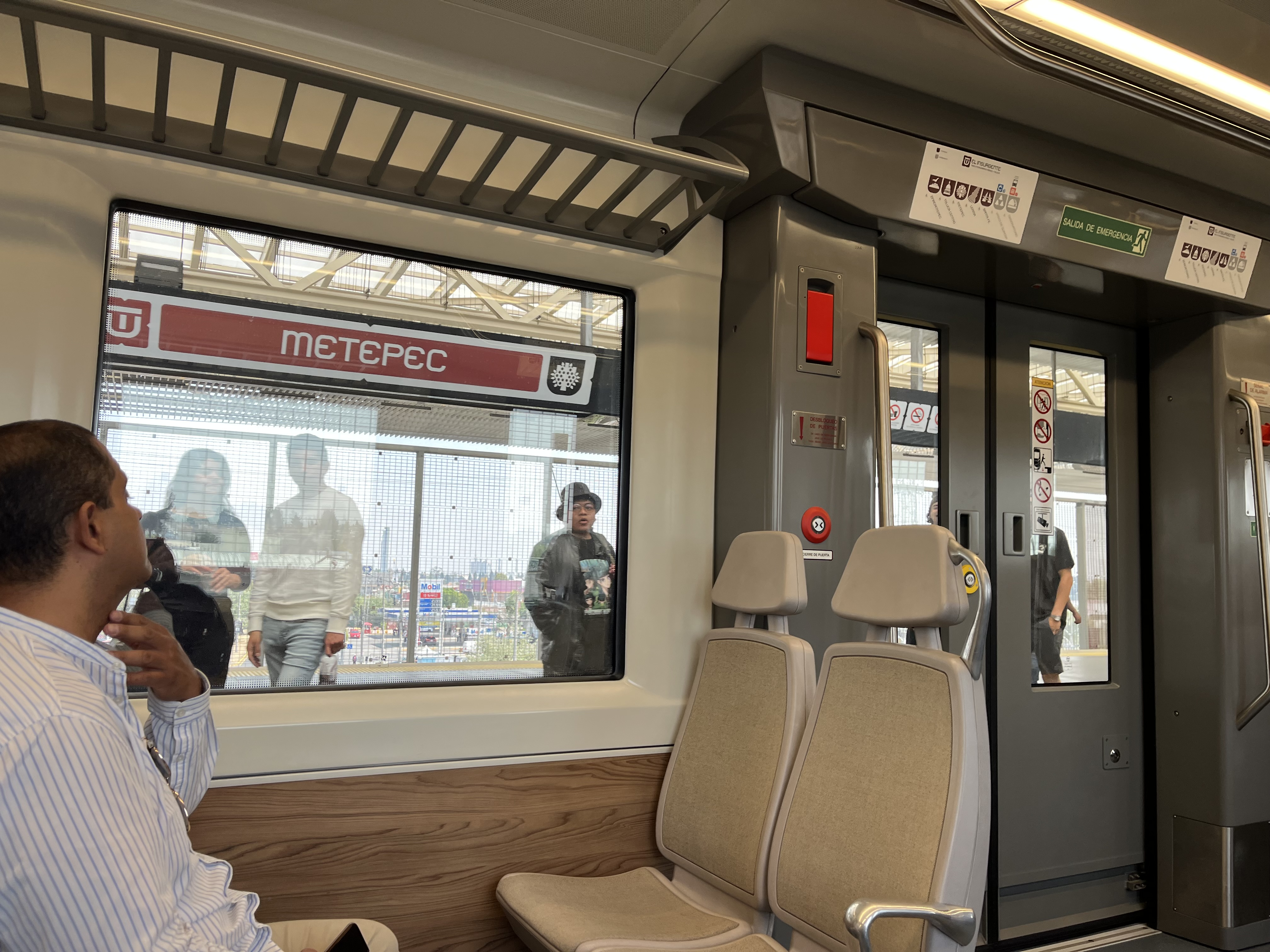

General information
- Other names: Tecnológico; Tecnológico–Aeropuerto
- Location: Boulevard Solidaridad Las Torres; Metepec, State of Mexico; Mexico
- Coordinates: 19.270283°N 99.641792°W
- System: Commuter rail
- Owner: Government of Mexico
- Operator: SICT
- Line: El Insurgente
- Platforms: 1 island platform
- Tracks: 2
- Connections: Toluca International Airport; Planned transport hub; Planned shuttle bus; Various intercity bus service routes

Construction
- Structure type: Elevated
- Parking: Parking lot
- Accessible: Yes

Other information
- Status: In service

History
- Opened: 15 September 2023

Services
| Preceding station | Tren Interurbano | Following station |
|---|---|---|
| Toluca Centro toward Zinacantepec | El Insurgente | Lerma toward Observatorio |
Route map
Location
- Location within State of Mexico
- Area map

The Metepec railway station, (Note: Estación Metepec; lit. transl. Metepec station. Spanish pronunciation: [meteˈpek]. The etymology comes from the Nahuatl language, "At the Maguey Hill".) otherwise known as the Tecnológico station (Note: Estación Tecnológico; lit. transl. Technologic station. Spanish pronunciation: [teɣnoˈloxiko].) or Tecnológico–Aeropuerto station, (Note: Estación Tecnológico–Aeropuerto; lit. transl. Airport station. Spanish pronunciation: [aeɾoˈpweɾto].) is a commuter railway station serving the El Insurgente commuter rail system which connects Greater Toluca, State of Mexico, with Mexico City. The station is the closest to the Toluca International Airport and is located along Boulevard Solidaridad Las Torres. The station is located nearby Tecnológico Avenue, in the municipality of Metepec.

Metepec railway station opened on 15 September 2023, with eastward service towards Lerma railway station and westward service towards Zinacantepec railway station. It is an elevated station with one island platform; the facilities are accessible to people with disabilities.

== Location and layout ==
Metepec railway station is a commuter railway station located along Boulevard Solidaridad Las Torres, near the instersection with Tecnológico Avenue, in Metepec. There are multiple shopping centers near the station. The municipal authorities forbidden the installation of street vendors, unlike other stations in the system.

The area is serviced by multiple intercity bus routes, including some which arrive from the municipality of Toluca. The government of the State of Mexico announced that a shuttle bus route is intended to connect the station with the city's airport. A freeway interchange road was built to reduce transportation times between both locations.

The station was built above ground level. It has a disabled-accessible service with elevators, escalators, tactile pavings, access ramps, braille signage plates, as well as visual signage and auditive announcements.

== Name ==
The station's projected names were "Tecnológico" (after the nearby avenue) and "Tecnológico–Aeropuerto", as it is the closest to the Toluca International Airport. Alfredo Quiroz Fuentes, local congressman, requested to rename the station to "Árbol de la Vida" (lit. transl. Tree of Life), in reference to a traditional local artwork, to honor the municipal potter's work.
