= Toluca Centro railway station =

Commuter rail station in the State of Mexico

Toluca Centro
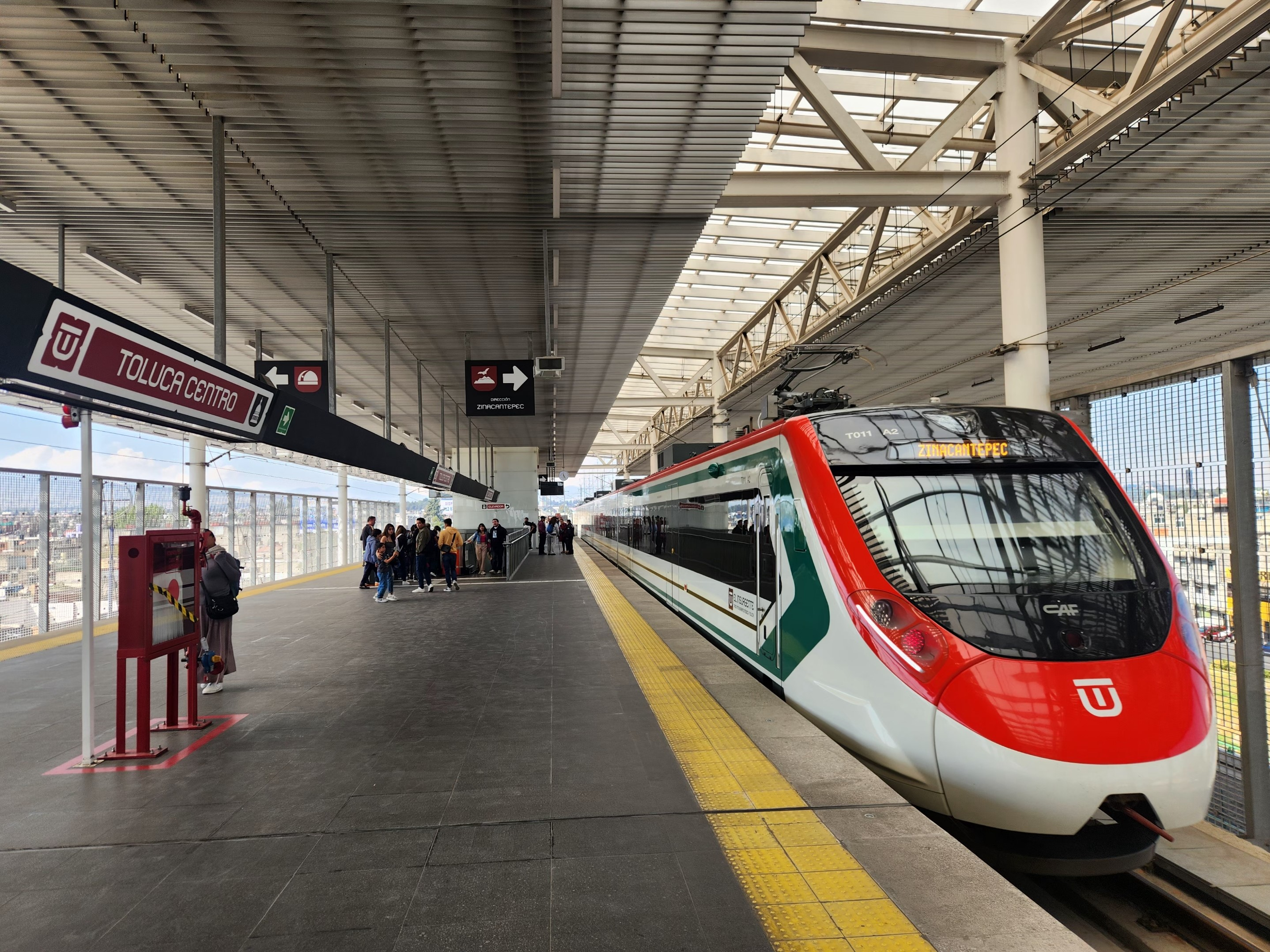
- Train station in February 2025

General information
- Other names: Terminal de Autobuses; Pino Suárez
- Location: Boulevard Solidaridad Las Torres; Toluca, State of Mexico; Mexico
- Coordinates: 19.270283°N 99.641792°W
- System: Commuter rail
- Owner: Government of Mexico
- Operator: SICT
- Line: El Insurgente
- Platforms: 1 island platform
- Tracks: 2
- Connections: Various intercity bus service routes

Construction
- Structure type: Elevated
- Parking: Kiss and ride
- Accessible: Yes

Other information
- Status: In service

History
- Opened: 15 September 2023

Services
Preceding station	Tren Interurbano	Following station
Zinacantepec Terminus	El Insurgente	Metepec toward Observatorio
Route map
Location
- Location within State of Mexico
- Area map

The Toluca Centro railway station, (Note: Estación Toluca Centro; lit. transl. Downtown Toluca station. Mexican Spanish pronunciation: [toˈluka ˈsentɾo]. The etymology comes from the Nahuatl language, "Where Tolo God lives".) otherwise known as Pino Suárez station (Note: Estación Pino Suárez. Mexican Spanish pronunciation: ['pino 'suaɾes].) or Terminal de Autobuses station, (Note: Estación Terminal de Autobuses; lit. transl. Bus Terminal station. Mexican Spanish pronunciation: [teɾmiˈnal de autoˈβuses].) is a commuter railway station serving the El Insurgente commuter rail system which connects Greater Toluca, State of Mexico, with Mexico City. The station is the closest to downtown Toluca and is located along Boulevard Solidaridad Las Torres and the nearby Boulevard José María Pino Suárez. The station is also the closest to the city's bus terminal.

Toluca Centro railway station opened on 15 September 2023, with eastward service towards Lerma railway station and westward service towards Zinacantepec railway station. It is an elevated station with one island platform; the facilities are accessible to people with disabilities.

== Location and layout ==
Toluca Centro railway station is a commuter railway station located along Boulevard Solidaridad Las Torres, in the instersection with Boulevard José María Pino Suárez, in Toluca de Lerdo, the capital of the State of Mexico.

The area is serviced by multiple intercity bus and shared taxis routes, including some which go to the municipalities of Metepec, Tenancingo, Tenango del Valle, Rayón, San Antonio la Isla, and San Mateo Mexicaltzingo. The station area frequently experiences traffic congestion. When the station opened, it became a hotspot for street vendors. On 29 September 2023, multiple vendors engaged on a fight; one resulted injured. After the incident, local authorities increased surveillance in the system.

The station was built above ground level. It has a disabled-accessible service with elevators, escalators, tactile pavings, access ramps, braille signage plates, as well as visual signage and auditive announcements.

The station's projected names were "Pino Suárez" (after the nearby avenue) and "Terminal de Autobuses", as it is the closest to the city's intercity bus terminal.
