= Santa Fe railway station (Mexico City) =

Commuter rail station in Mexico City

Santa Fe
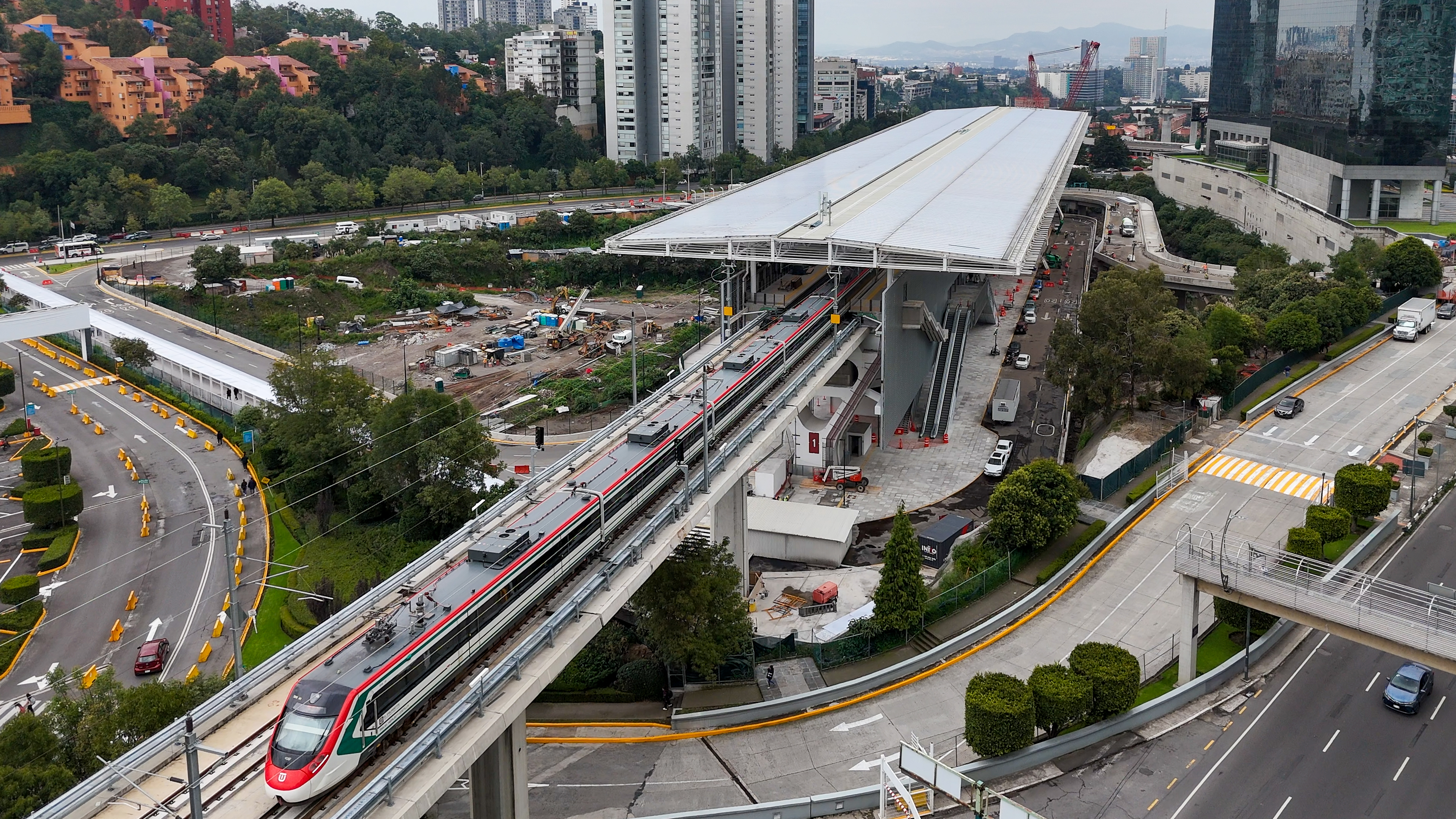

General information
- Location: Avenida Vasco de Quiroga; Cuajimalpa, Mexico City; Mexico
- Coordinates: 19.364475°N 99.268200°W
- System: Commuter rail
- Owner: Government of Mexico
- Operator: SICT
- Line: El Insurgente
- Platforms: 1 island platform
- Tracks: 2
- Connections: Routes: 34-A, 34-B, 76-A; Route: 5

Construction
- Structure type: Elevated
- Parking: Yes (Centro Santa Fe)
- Accessible: Yes

Other information
- Status: In service

History
- Opened: 1 September 2024

Services
Preceding station	Tren Interurbano	Following station
Lerma toward Zinacantepec	El Insurgente	Vasco de Quiroga toward Observatorio
Route map
Location
- Location within State of Mexico
- Area map

The Santa Fe railway station (Note: Estación Santa Fe; lit. transl. Santa Fe station. Spanish pronunciation: [santaˈfe]. The name of the station means "Holy Faith" in Spanish.) is a commuter railway station serving the El Insurgente commuter rail system which connects Greater Toluca, State of Mexico, with Mexico City. The station is located next to the shopping mall Centro Santa Fe, in Santa Fe, Cuajimalpa, Mexico City.

Santa Fe station was inaugurated on 31 August 2024 and it opened incomplete the next day, serving as a provisional terminal station with westward service towards Zinacantepec railway station. It is an elevated station with one island platform; the facilities are accessible to people with disabilities.

== Location and layout ==
Santa Fe railway station is a commuter railway station located along Avenida Vasco de Quiroga, in Santa Fe, Cuajimalpa, Mexico City. It is next to the shopping mall Centro Santa Fe. The area is serviced by multiple local bus routes as well as the Red de Transporte de Pasajeros (RTP) network. The station was built above ground level. It has a disabled-accessible service with elevators, escalators, tactile pavings, access ramps, braille signage plates, as well as visual signage and auditive announcements.

The area is serviced by Routes 9C, 34A, 34B, 76, and 76A of the Red de Transporte de Pasajeros network, as well as other local bus routes.

== History and construction ==
Santa Fe railway station is an elevated railway station. The stretch between Santa Fe and Lerma stations crosses the Monte de las Cruces, which required the construction of a 10 kilometers (6.2 mi) tunnel and 17 kilometers (11 mi) of viaducts—some as tall as 80 meters (260 ft)—to navigate the steep and uneven landscape, which includes slopes of up to 6%.

The station was inaugurated on 31 August 2024 and opened under construction the next day, because there were still incomplete areas, such as the side stairs, parts of the facade, and elevators, as well as several loose cables hanging in the station. The areas for public transport boarding and alighting were inoperative. Additionally, machinery and construction equipment, including cranes, backhoes, forklifts, and stacked construction materials were present.

=== Incidents ===
On 3 April 2025, a portion of the station's roof was detached due to strong winds in the area, with no casualties reported.
