= Vasco de Quiroga (disambiguation) =

Vasco de Quiroga (c. 1470/78 – 1565) was the first bishop of Michoacán, Mexico. Things named after him include:

- Vasco de Quiroga (Cablebús), Álvaro Obregón, Mexico City
- Vasco de Quiroga railway station, Álvaro Obregón, Mexico City
- Vasco de Quiroga (Mexico City Metrobús), Gustavo A. Madero, Mexico City
