= House of CB =

Women's fashion retailer

- Industry: Fashion
- Founded: 2010
- Founder: Conna Walker
- Products: Lingerie, swimwear, shoes, accessories, bridal collection
- Website: www.houseofcb.com

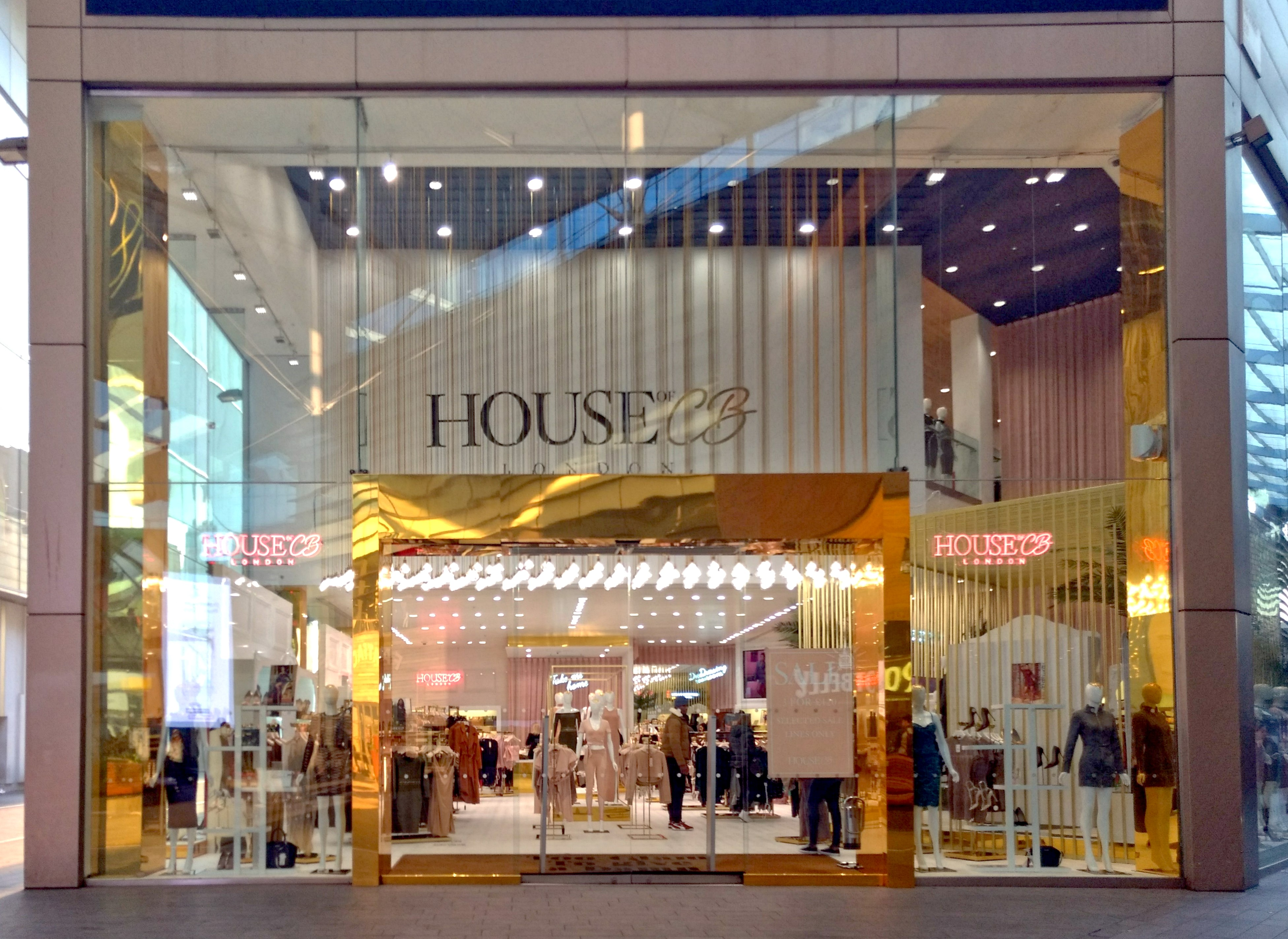
House of CB, Westfield Stratford City, London.

House of CB (House of Celeb Boutique) is a women's fashion retailer founded by Conna Walker in 2010 and headquartered in London, UK. Since the start of the brand, Walker wanted to design clothing that would give the illusion of an hourglass silhouette, and continues to be the brand's unique selling proposition. House of CB is known for its form-fitting and tailored pieces, producing designer-inspired party clothing. The company currently has over 40 retail locations, 4.5 million followers on social and achieved in $15 million in 2018 profits.

== History ==
The brand was founded by a then 17 year old, Conna Walker, who started her business buying and selling ready-made pieces, from China, under the name of Celeb Boutique on eBay. She would eventually build her own website and rebrand to House of CB with a £3,880 loan from her father. The brand includes a full collection of womenswear that also covers lingerie, swimwear, shoes, and accessories. Its garments have been worn by celebrities, such as Beyoncé, Gigi Hadid, Lady Gaga, Jennifer Lopez, and the Kardashians. In 2016 Walker introduced House of CB's younger sister brand, Mistress Rocks. House of CB is considered more sustainable than other "Throw-away fashion" because it is of higher quality and shelf-life. “In 2019, founder Conna Walker was named to the Forbes 30 under 30 Europe list in the Art & Culture category, recognizing her success in building House of CB into an international fashion retailer.”

== Brand Evolution ==
Originally an online retailer specializing in party-wear, House of CB has grown into a globally recognized brand offering luxury clothing with an emphasis on form-fitting designs. The brand's transition from a niche e-commerce site to a significant presence in the fashion industry illustrates its strategic growth and impactful marketing approaches. Founder Conna Walker early on recognized the potential of social media for promotion, particularly through platforms like Instagram. House of CB's social media strategy, which includes partnerships with influencers, sponsored posts, and celebrity endorsements, has supported a consistent monthly growth rate of 2.71% and increased engagement.

House of CB has diversified its offerings to include evening dresses, accessories, and a fitness line, along with a bridal collection introduced in 2020.

Describing itself as "affordable luxury," House of CB's products are priced between £59 ($73) and £209 ($261.) The brand's marketing efforts include engaging directly with consumers through social media by re-sharing customer images, conducting contests, and sharing behind-the-scenes content from photo shoots. The visibility of the brand has been further enhanced by public endorsements from influencers and celebrities who often wear its clothing at high-profile events.

== Marketing ==
House of CB has utilized social media to expand its brand visibility and foster business growth. After the initial launch in 2009 on eBay, Walker shifted in 2014 to creating a personalized online store.

A central aspect of House of CB’s marketing strategy is the strategic use of social media platforms, notably Instagram, where it currently sits at 4.5 million followers as of May 2024.

Additionally, the brand engages both micro- and mega-influencers, aiming to expand its audience reach. This strategy of influencer collaboration, alongside the brand's consistent growth in social media followers, demonstrates the brand's ability to utilize digital platforms to enhance its market presence.
