= P. Johnson =

Multi-channel Australian menswear and fashion label

- Industry: Retail
- Founded: 2008; 18 years ago
- Founder: Patrick Johnson
- Headquarters: Sydney
- Website: pjt.com

P. Johnson is an Australian menswear and fashion label founded in 2009 by Patrick Johnson.

The label encompasses several flagship stores across Australia, also appearing in New York and London, with interior design by Johnson's wife, Tamsin Johnson.
