= Lerma railway station (State of Mexico) =

Commuter rail station in the State of Mexico

Lerma
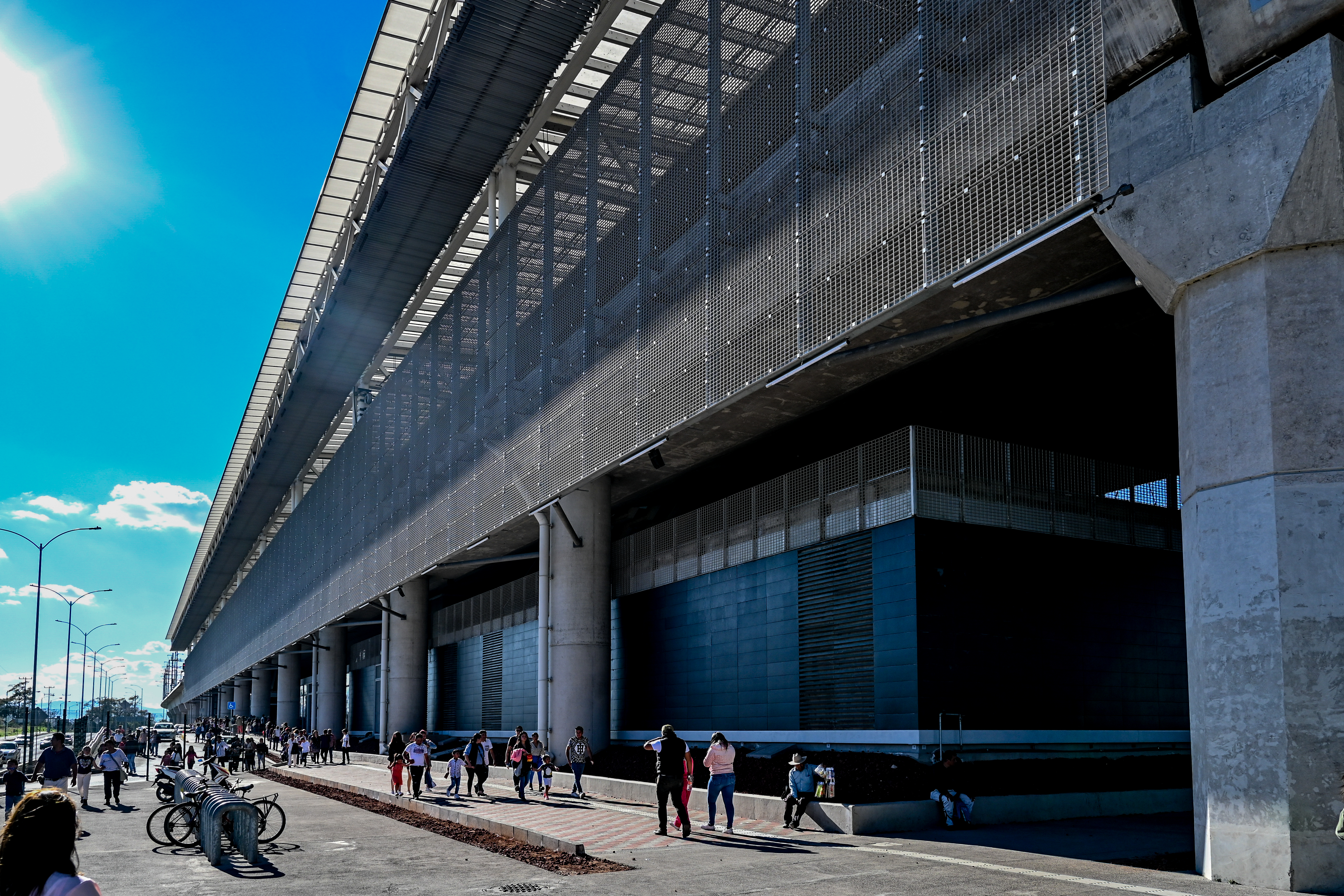

General information
- Location: Boulevard Solidaridad Las Torres; Lerma, State of Mexico; Mexico
- Coordinates: 19.278489°N 99.514975°W
- System: Commuter rail
- Owner: Government of Mexico
- Operator: SICT
- Line: El Insurgente
- Platforms: 1 island platform
- Tracks: 2
- Connections: Various intercity bus service routes

Construction
- Structure type: Elevated
- Parking: Kiss and ride
- Accessible: Yes

Other information
- Status: In service

History
- Opened: 15 September 2023

Services
Preceding station	Tren Interurbano	Following station
Metepec toward Zinacantepec	El Insurgente	Santa Fe toward Observatorio
Route map
Location
- Location within State of Mexico
- Area map

The Lerma railway station (Note: Estación Lerma; lit. transl. Lerma station. Spanish pronunciation: [ˈleɾma]. The etymology comes from the Nahuatl language, "Where crows are in the fields".) is a commuter railway station serving the El Insurgente commuter rail system which connects Greater Toluca, State of Mexico, with Mexico City. The station is the closest to the La Marquesa National Park and is located along Boulevard Solidaridad Las Torres, in the municipality of Lerma.

Lerma railway station opened on 15 September 2023, serving as a provisional terminal station with westward service towards Zinacantepec railway station. Eastward service towards Santa Fe railway station started on 1 September 2024. It is an elevated station with one island platform; the facilities are accessible to people with disabilities.

== Location and layout ==
Lerma railway station is a commuter railway station located along Boulevard Solidaridad Las Torres, in San Pedro Tultepec, Lerma. It is close to the Universidad Autónoma Metropolitana's Lerma campus as well as the Outlet Lerma shopping mall. The station is also the closest to the La Marquesa National Park.

When the station opened, it became a hotspot for street vendors and unregulated taxis. One reporter from El Sol de México counted as many as 60 clandestine stands, more than at any station in the system. Both groups would ask local authorities for support to regularize their sources of employment in the area surrounding the station.

The area is serviced by multiple intercity bus and shared taxis routes, including some that go to the municipalities of Ocoyoacac and Toluca. The station was built above ground level. It has a disabled-accessible service with elevators, escalators, tactile pavings, access ramps, braille signage plates, as well as visual signage and auditive announcements.

== History and construction ==
Lerma railway station is an elevated railway station. The stretch between Lerma and Santa Fe stations crosses the Monte de las Cruces, which required the construction of a 10 kilometers (6.2 mi) tunnel and 17 kilometers (11 mi) of viaducts—some as tall as 80 meters (260 ft)—to navigate the steep and uneven landscape, which includes slopes of up to 6%.
