= Vasco de Quiroga railway station =

Commuter rail station in Mexico City

Vasco de Quiroga
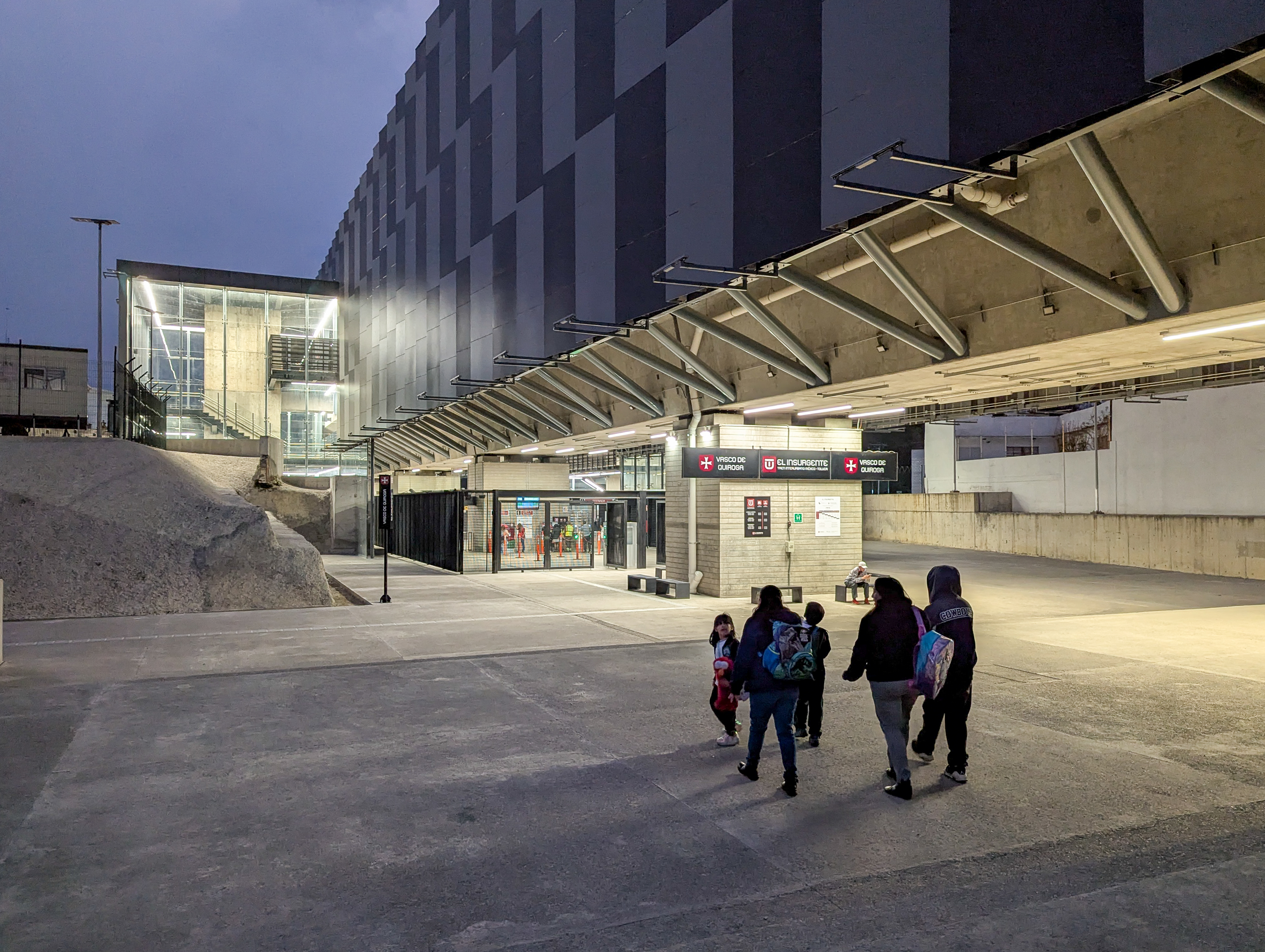

General information
- Location: Avenida Vasco de Quiroga; Álvaro Obregón, Mexico City; Mexico
- Coordinates: 19.384971°N 99.236091°W
- System: Commuter rail
- Owner: Government of Mexico
- Operator: SICT
- Line: El Insurgente
- Platforms: 1 island platform
- Tracks: 2
- Connections: Vasco de Quiroga

Construction
- Structure type: Elevated
- Parking: Yes
- Accessible: Yes

Other information
- Status: In use

History
- Opened: 2 February 2026

Services
Preceding station	Tren Interurbano	Following station
Santa Fe toward Zinacantepec	El Insurgente	Observatorio Terminus
Route map
Location
- Location within Mexico City
- Area map

The Vasco de Quiroga railway station (Note: Estación Vasco de Quiroga; Spanish pronunciation: [ˈbasko ðe kiˈɾoɣa].) is a commuter railway station serving the El Insurgente commuter rail system which connects Greater Toluca, State of Mexico, with Mexico City. The station is located near Avenida Vasco de Quiroga and the Cablebús aerial lift station of the same name, located in Santa Fe, Álvaro Obregón, Mexico City. It opened on 2 February 2026.

== Location and layout ==
Vasco de Quiroga railway station is a commuter railway station located near Avenida Vasco de Quiroga, in the original town of Santa Fe, in Álvaro Obregón, Mexico City. The station was built above ground level. It has a disabled-accessible service with elevators, escalators, tactile pavings, access ramps, braille signage plates, as well as visual signage and auditive announcements. The area is serviced by the Cablebús aerial tram system, at Vasco de Quiroga station. Vasco de Quiroga railway station has a small parking area.

== History and construction ==
For the section running from Santa Fe to Vasco de Quiroga, a cable-stayed bridge was built. It spans 500 meters (1,600 ft) and is equipped with an anti-seismic system. It was built over an ecologically protected area, avoiding a natural spring within the Chapultepec park. Its main towers are V-shaped—one stands 65 metres (213 ft) tall and the other 75 metres (246 ft)—which helps improve the curve's dynamics as trains pass.

The station was opened on 2 February 2026.

== Incidents ==
Two workers fell approximately 10 metres (33 ft) from a platform during construction of the cable-stayed bridge; one was killed and the other was seriously injured.
