= Teotihuacan Priests =

- City: Mexico City, Mexico
- League: Liga Mexicana Élite
- Founded: 2010
- Home arena: Centro Santa Fe
- Colors: White and blue
- General manager: (Mexico) Gustavo Méndez
- Head coach: (Mexico) Jorge Rovelo
Home colours

The Teotihuacan Priests are a semi-professional ice hockey team in Mexico City, Mexico. They play in the Liga Mexicana Élite.

== History ==
The club founded in 2010, and joined the LME for the 2010-11 season. They finished in third place in the regular season, and were playoff champions by defeating the Aztec Eagle Warriors in the semifinals, and the Mayan Astronomers in the finals. Derek Nachimow scored all three goals for the Priests in the final.

== Season-by-Season Results ==
Season	GP	W	L	SOW	SOL	Pts	GF	GA	Place	Playoffs
Liga Mexicana Élite
2010-11	12	3	6	1	2	13	32	41	3rd	Won Final

== Honours ==
- Liga Mexicana Élite:
  - Winners (1): 2018–19
