= Liga Mexicana Elite de Hockey =

Hockey league based in Mexico

- Sport: Ice hockey
- Founded: 2017
- No. of teams: 6
- Country: Mexico
- Most recent champions: Olmec Stone Heads (1st title)
- Most titles: Teotihuacan Priests (2 title)

The Liga Mexicana Elite de Hockey (LMEH) is the highest level ice hockey competition in Mexico. The league comprised six clubs, all based in Mexico City.

== Overview ==
The Mexican League Elite de Hockey, LME, Ice Hockey was inaugurated on 2 October 2010 with the aim to establish Mexico as a high-level international competitor in ice hockey.

The participation of the best players in Mexico could serve as encouragement for those players at lower levels of the sport in Mexico and eventually play in the Mexico national team at international competitions against high quality foreign teams.

The first League season (2010–2011) started with 4 teams: Mayan Astronomers, Aztec Eagle Warriors, Teotihuacan Priests and Zapotec Totems, which were integrated through a draft, where players are ranked in categories "AAA" "AA", "A" and then, each team chose their players in succession, so that 4 sets have the same competitive level.

Fifteen days before the "play off" teams have a period of transfer or exchange of players, where teams will have the opportunity to improve their competitive edge.

They play a four round system ("round robin") and their final. The team with the most points will automatically qualify for the final. Those who remain in second and third place play a best-of-three series. The winner will play the number-one team during the finals. The champion is declared when a best-of-three series is played between these two last teams.

For the second season, the Mexican Sports Federation Ice Hockey, AC seek to integrate the Mexican League Elite, a fifth team will consist of novice players. This new team will have the right to select some players from the four other teams prior to start; but the existing four teams can identify a list of "protected players" that the new expansion team cannot select. Each year will include a Mexican Elite League expansion team until there are 8 teams.

Mexican Sports Federation Ice Hockey, AC, awarded cash prizes for winning team in the near future, aims to set salaries for players of all teams, as well as explore the possibility of bringing foreign players to integrate the different Mexican League Elite teams.

Since 2023 season Gustavo Mendez started functions as Commissioner being the first in LMEH history where he wants to rule on 3 standards: fair play, respect to referees and staff and awards to MVPs and runner ups every end of season.

In 2023–24, Panagiotis Mavridis signed with the Aztec Eagle Warriors, suiting up with the team in a 2–1 shootout victory.

Olmec Stone Heads became the most winning team in the Liga Mexicana Elite de Hockey after a back-to-back win over Teotihuacan Priests in the 2025 final with 5-0 score the highest difference for a champion team. As well Olmec Stone Heads is the only team to win 3 championships straight.

== Teams ==
The teams are based in Mexico City and games are played at the Centro Santa Fe ice rink.

Current teams
Team	Founded	Joined
Aztec Eagle Warriors	2010	2011
Cholula Hunters	2024	
Mayan Astronomers	2010	2011
Olmec Stone Heads	2017	
Tarascan Archers	2024	
Teotihuacan Priests	2010	2011

Former teams
Team	Founded	Joined	Folded
Zapotec Totems	2010	2011	2011

== League champions ==
=== By seasons ===
Year	Playoffs			League winners
Year	Champions	Score	Finalists	League winners
2010–11	Teotihuacan Priests (1)	2–1 (series)	Mayan Astronomers	Mayan Astronomers
2017–18	Mayan Astronomers (1)	4–1	Teotihuacan Priests	Teotihuacan Priests
2018–19	Teotihuacan Priests (2)	3–2 (SO)	Aztec Eagle Warriors	Teotihuacan Priests
2019–20	Remainder of season cancelled in March due to the COVID-19 pandemic.			
2023	Olmec Stone Heads (1)	2–1	Aztec Eagle Warriors	Aztec Eagle Warriors
2024	Olmec Stone Heads	3–1	Teotihuacan Priests	Olmec Stone Heads
2025	Olmec Stone Heads	5–0	Teotihuacan Priests	Mayan Astronomers

=== All-time record ===
Team	# Titles	Years
Olmec Stone Heads	3	2023, 2024, 2025
Teotihuacan Priests	2	2011, 2019
Mayan Astronomers	1	2018
