= El Insurgente =

Inter-city rail line in Mexico

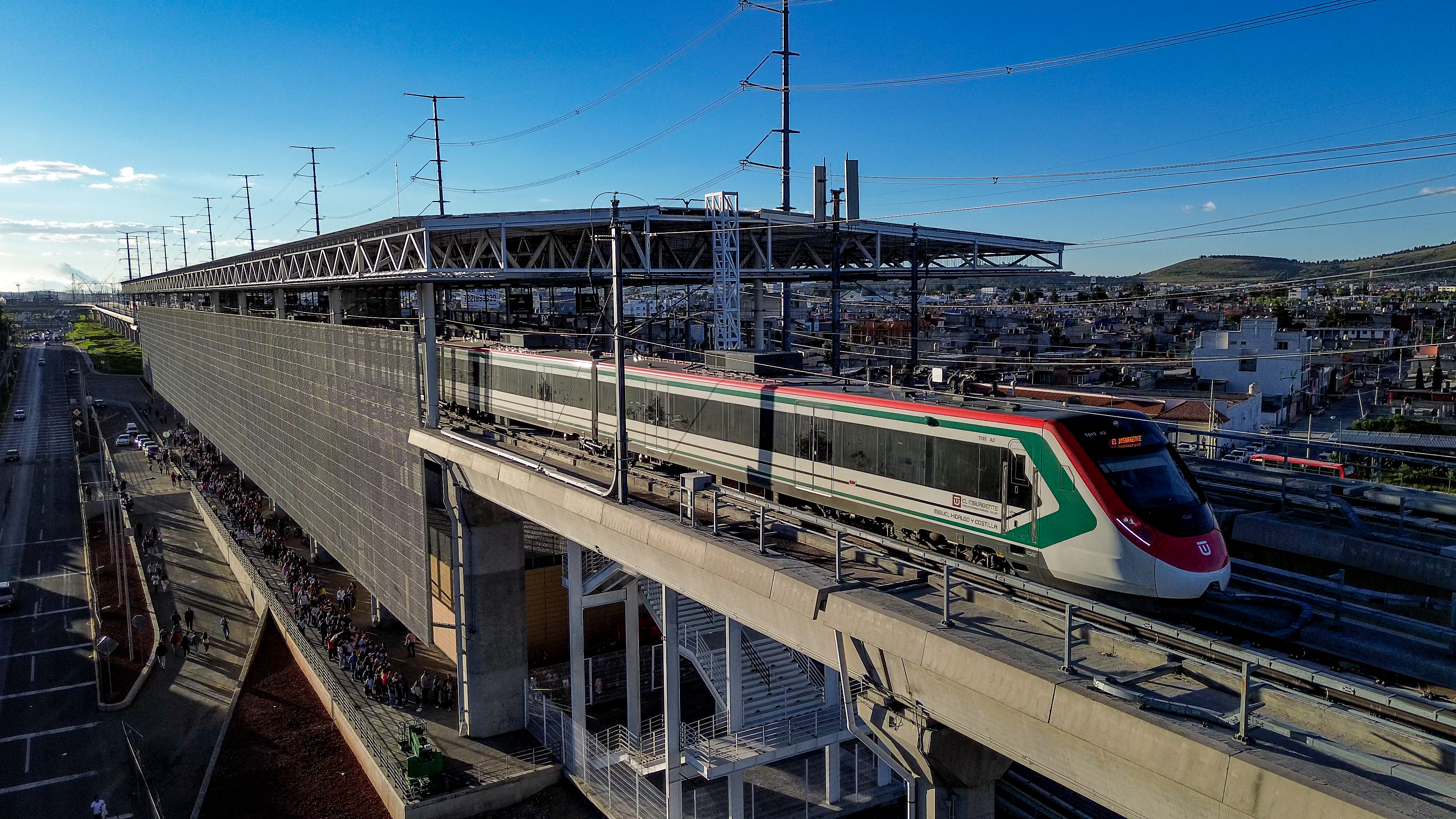
- El Insurgente train leaving Zinacantepec station

Overview
- Locale: Greater Mexico City
- Termini: Zinacantepec; Observatorio
- Stations: 7

Service
- Type: Inter-city rail
- System: Tren Interurbano
- Rolling stock: CAF Civity-based EMUs

History
- Opened: 15 September 2023
- Last extension: 2 February 2026

Technical
- Line length: 57.7 km (35.9 mi)
- Num of tracks: 2
- Track gauge: 1,435 mm (4 ft 8 1/2 in) standard gauge
- Electrification: Overhead line, 25 kV 60 Hz AC
- Operating speed: 160 km/h (99 mph)

El Insurgente (lit. 'The Insurgent') is a 57.7-kilometre (35.9 mi) inter-city rail line connecting Mexico City and Toluca in the State of Mexico. As part of the Tren Interurbano system, it is formally known as the Tren Interurbano Mexico City–Toluca. The project was announced by President Enrique Peña Nieto on 1 December 2012, and construction began in 2014.

== History ==
=== Background ===
As a part of then-President Enrique Peña Nieto's plan to offer public transport from Toluca to Mexico City, a cost–benefit analysis report was drafted and published in November 2013. The report proposed several routes. The three routes were concentrated to the metro terminals of Cuatro Caminos, Tacubaya, and Observatorio. Ultimately, the third route along Avenida Las Torres to Observatorio was chosen in order to avert future sprawl, avoid deforestation in the Sierra de las Cruces, and prevent pollution of aquifers that supply water to residents. A section of the chosen route was altered by 4.3 km (2.7 mi) in October 2015 to no longer run above Avenida Vasco de Quiroga in Cuajimalpa.

The railway line is electrified and elevated with a tunnel portion between the State of Mexico and Mexico City. There are seven stations: four stations located in the State of Mexico, and the remaining three located in Mexico City. The line is designed to complement the Mexico City Metro by terminating at Observatorio station of Line 1 and provide heavy railway service to the Santa Fe business district. A shuttle provides connections to Toluca International Airport at the Metepec station (formerly named Tecnológico). The inter-city line runs parallel to Avenida Las Torres and Mexican Federal Highway 15/Mexican Federal Highway 15D. The total cost of the project was estimated at $38.6 billion MXN in 2014.

=== Construction ===
El Insurgente train in operation

The Secretariat of Communications and Transportation (SCT) divided the project into three sections for contractors to bid on:

Section 1 covers the western terminal in Zinacantepec to the eastern tunnel entrance at Sierra de las Cruces. This encompasses 36.1 km (22.4 mi) of the project. The contracts were awarded to La Peninsular Compañía Constructora and Constructora de Proyectos Viales de México.

Section 2 is the 4.6 km (2.9 mi) tunnel portion underneath Sierra de las Cruces. Ingenieros Civiles y Asociados was awarded the contract.

Section 3 involves the 17 km (11 mi) Mexico City portion from the western tunnel entrance at Sierra de las Cruces to the Metro Observatorio Station. The contract was awarded to a consortium.

For its rolling stock, Spanish manufacturing company CAF was awarded a contract in 2014 to construct 30 EMUs for $11.6 billion MXN (€690 million). Each EMU will have five cars, have a capacity of 700 passengers, and operate at a maximum speed of 160 km/h (99 mph). Deliveries for the trainsets began in January 2017.

The train depot is located west of Zinacantepec station and was built at a cost of MXN942 million. The contract was awarded to a consortium in March 2016.

In July 2014, a formal ceremony was carried out by the head of SCT, Gerardo Ruiz Esparza, to mark the start of construction.

There have been several construction accidents during the project. On 4 May 2016, the temporary support structures gave way, causing the concrete decking to collapse near the intersection of Avenida Las Torres and Avenida Colón in Toluca. On 2 June 2016, bad weather caused concrete-reinforced rebar to fold onto traffic near the intersection of Avenida Las Torres and Avenida Díaz Mirón in Toluca. On 7 July 2016, a work site caved in killing one worker and injuring two. On 16 July 2016, a construction worker was killed when a truck lost control and struck the worker on a construction site in Metepec.

In July 2019, the SCT determined the project's completion would be delayed to the end of 2022. Javier Jiménez Espriú, head of the SCT, announced the project was 87% complete; however, there have been cost overruns from $42.72 billion MXN in 2015 to $73.72 billion MXN in 2019. President Andres Manuel Lopez Obrador inaugurated the opening of Section 1 of the rail line in September 2023, but since the train runs only through stations in Toluca, not through to Mexico City, ridership was exceptionally low as of December 2023.

On 1 September 2023, the line was branded as El Insurgente, after Miguel Hidalgo. On 15 September 2023, the first section from Zinacantepec to Lerma opened, with four trains initially running on the section. On 31 August 2024, the second section from Lerma to Santa Fe inaugurated. On 2 February 2026, the third section from Santa Fe to Observatorio was inaugurated, completing the line.

== Stations ==
Key (Note: The following list was adapted from different websites and official maps.: Metro connections obtained from the official Mexico City Metro system map.; Accessibility obtained from the Mexico City Metro system map. In some cases, the map omits the accessibility icon as the station(s) are actually partially accessible. However, the respective websites of each station on the official site indicate the respective accessibility methods. Stations with the symbol are fully accessible; stations with the symbol are partially accessible.; Cablebús obtained from their official website.; Centro de transferencia modal (CETRAM;) obtained from the official website of the Órgano Regulador de Transporte.; Ecobici obtained from their official website.; Metrobús obtained from the Mexico City Metrobús system map.; Mexibús obtained from the official Mexico City Metro system map.; Mexicable obtained from the official Mexico City Metro system map.; Public buses network (peseros) obtained from the official website of the Órgano Regulador de Transporte.; Red de Transporte de Pasajeros obtained from their official website.; Trolleybuses obtained from their official website.)
Handicapped/disabled access	Fully accessible station	Cablebús Line {{{3}}}	Cablebús connection	Red de Transporte de Pasajeros	RTP connection
Handicapped/disabled access	Partially accessible station	Mexibús	Mexibús connection	Tren Interurbano	Tren Interurbano connection
Transfer hub	CETRAM transfer station	Mexicable	Mexicable connection	Tren Suburbano	Tren Suburbano connection
Transfer hub	ETRAM transfer station	Mexico City Metro	Mexico City Metro connection	Trolleybus	Trolleybus connection
Ecobici	Ecobici bikeshare	Mexico City minubus	Pesero connection	Mexico City Light Rail	Mexico City Light Rail connection

No.	Icon	Station (Note: Proposed names. All the stations will be fully accessible to people with disabilities.)	Level	Connection	Location		Date opened
01		Zinacantepec	Elevated	(planned); Various intercity routes	Toluca	State of Mexico	15 September 2023
02		Toluca Centro	Elevated	Various intercity routes	Toluca	State of Mexico	15 September 2023
03		Metepec	Elevated	(planned); Shuttle to Toluca International Airport (planned); Various intercity routes	Metepec	State of Mexico	15 September 2023
04		Lerma	Elevated	Various intercity routes	Lerma	State of Mexico	15 September 2023
05		Santa Fe	Elevated	34A, 34B, 76A; 5	Cuajimalpa de Morelos	Mexico City	31 August 2024
06		Vasco de Quiroga	Elevated	(at distance)	Álvaro Obregón	Mexico City	2 February 2026
07		Observatorio	Elevated	(at Observatorio); Western Central Bus Terminal	Álvaro Obregón	Mexico City	2 February 2026
