= Fashion brand =

Brands that operate within the fashion industry

The term fashion brand (or fashion label) includes all the brands that operate within the fashion industry. A fashion brand combines symbolism, style, and experiential elements, and it needs to differentiate its products and coordinate its supply chain to succeed in the market. Consumers commonly employ brands as a means of expressing either their genuine identity or an idealized self-image that they aspire to achieve.

== History ==
Before the mid-19th century, clothing was mainly handmade for individuals, either domestically or by hiring dressmakers and tailors. The origins of couture can be traced back to the mid-nineteenth century in Paris. Charles Frederick Worth pioneered haute couture by introducing high-fashion dressmaking. Currently, the concept has gained widespread acceptance. Chanel, Balenciaga, and Christian Dior are prominent fashion brands that offer haute couture lines. However, with technological advancements and the rise of global capitalism in the early 20th century, factory production and retail stores, such as department stores, emerged, allowing for mass production of clothing in standardised sizes and fixed prices.

== Global fashion brands ==
The fashion industry is widely recognised as one of the most actively internationalising sectors within the retail industry. A significant proportion of globally recognised fashion brands conduct the majority of their commercial activities beyond their country of origin. International operations are the primary source of revenue for prominent brands such as H&M, Inditex, and Nike. Nike's global success serves as a pertinent illustration of the significance of brand extensions in the growth of sport brands. Other prominent brands in this industry, including Adidas, Reebok, Puma, and Asics, have similarly embraced this trend by introducing new apparel and footwear offerings.

== Categorization ==
The fashion industry involves the design, production, distribution, marketing, retailing, advertising, and promotion of various types of clothing for men, women, and children. This includes both high-end designer fashion and everyday clothing, ranging from couture ball gowns to casual sweatpants. The category of fashion brands displays a significant variation in terms of both price segmentation and product quality.

=== Luxury brands ===
Premium and luxury brands are characterised by their exceptional performance in their designated market segments, along with their capability to offer distinctive and valuable features and benefits that are specific to their products. Examples are Gucci and Hermès.

=== Mid-luxury brands ===
Ralph Lauren is among the fashion brands classified as mid-luxury in the United States market.

=== Discount supermarket brands or chains ===
KiK, Lidl, and Aldi are currently expanding their discount segments, catering to a clientele that is particularly price-sensitive and seeks low-cost options. The purchasing decisions of those in this category are not influenced by the quality of the product.

=== Fast fashion brands ===
In recent times, there has been a rise in the emergence of fast-fashion companies such as Zara, H&M, Primark, and Mango. These companies have garnered a positive reputation by swiftly adapting to the ever-changing fashion trends. Furthermore, the customers' increasing demand for fresh styles and a wider range of products has led to shorter production cycles and the introduction of micro-collections.

== Fashion brand communication ==
In the fashion industry, brand communication denotes how fashion brands engage and establish connections with their consumers and the larger society through diverse channels such as initiatives, platforms, spaces, and interfaces. The communication strategies employed by brands exhibit unique characteristics that set them apart from those utilised in other industries and sectors.

The communication of fashion brands encompasses a range of activities, including visual brand communication, product design, advertising, public relations, and brand experience. Other forms of brand communication includes multiple forms of collaborations with external entities via sponsorships, or social media influencers. In addition, fashion brands often create limited brand collaborations with other brands to produce limited editions and collectable items.
