= Mayan Astronomers =

- City: Mexico City, Mexico
- League: Liga Mexicana Élite
- Founded: 2010
- Home arena: Centro Santa Fe
- Colors: Navy blue and orange
- General manager: (Mexico) Jorge Alfaro Pérez
- Head coach: (Canada) Brian Wilson
Home colours

The Mayan Astronomers are a semi-professional ice hockey team in Mexico City, Mexico. They play in the Liga Mexicana Élite.

== History ==
The Astronomers were founded in 2010, and began playing in the LME. They finished in first place in the regular season, but lost in the finals of the playoffs, two games to one, to the Teotihuacan Priests.

== Season-by-Season Results ==
Season	GP	W	L	SOW	SOL	Pts	GF	GA	Place	Playoffs
2010-11	12	7	2	0	3	24	53	36	1st	Lost Final

== Honours ==
- Liga Mexicana Élite:
  - Winners (1): 2017–18
