= Cablebús =

Mexican public transport system project

- Logo

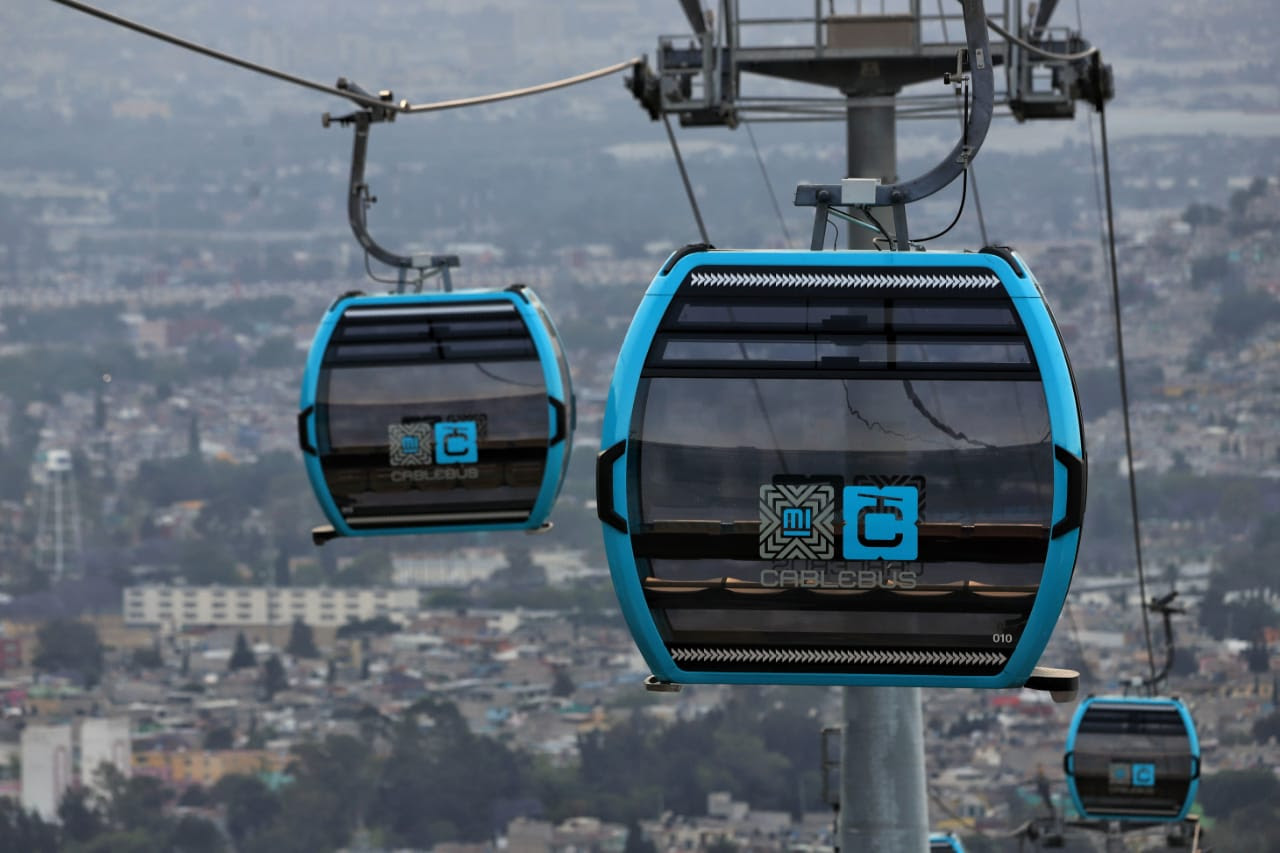

Overview
- Area served: Valley of Mexico (for Line 1); Iztapalapa (for Line 2); Álvaro Obregón and Miguel Hidalgo (for Line 3)
- Locale: Gustavo A. Madero and Iztapalapa, Mexico City
- Transit type: Aerial lift
- Number of lines: 3
- Number of stations: 19
- Daily ridership: Avg. 45,000 (Line 1, May 2022)
- Website: ste.cdmx.gob.mx

Operation
- Began operation: 11 July 2021
- Operator: Servicio de Transportes Eléctricos
- Number of vehicles: 377 (Line 1); 305 (Line 2); 71 (Line 3)

Technical
- System length: 24.75 km (15.4 mi)
- Average speed: 20 km/h (12 mph)

The Sistema de Transporte Público Cablebús, simply branded as Cablebús, (Note: Often just Cablebus (without diacritics) in English-language sources.) is an aerial lift transport system that runs in the Gustavo A. Madero and Iztapalapa areas of Mexico City. It is operated by Servicio de Transportes Eléctricos, the agency responsible for the operation of all trolleybus and light rail services in Mexico City. Line 1 was officially inaugurated on 11 July 2021, going from the Indios Verdes station of the STC Metro to the northern neighborhoods of Gustavo A. Madero. Line 2 runs from the Constitución de 1917 to the Santa Marta STC Metro stations in the southeast of the city. Line 3 runs along the Chapultepec city park. Two additional lines are under planning.

== History ==
Line 1's construction started in September 2019 with an investment of 3 billion Mexican pesos. Doppelmayr México and Grupo Indi built Line 1; Leitner Ropeways built Line 2.

On 4 March 2021, Line 1's Campos Revolución and Tlalpexco stations were opened for operational trials, and the rest of the line was officially inaugurated on 11 July 2021. Line 2 was inaugurated on 8 August 2021.

== Service ==
The fare is 7 pesos (MXN) per trip. Service is free of charge for users over 70 years of age, children under 5 years of age, and people with evident disabilities.

The gondola lift used for the Cablebus travels at approximately 20 km/h (12 mph) on average.

Similarly to the Mexico City Metro system, Cablebús stations feature pictograms symbolizing either the names of the stations or a significant feature in the region. They were designed by American graphic designer Lance Wyman, who also designed all the pictograms for the Movilidad Integrada system. The system is light blue-colored representing the color of the sky.

=== Existing Lines ===
Key (Note: The following list was adapted from different websites and official maps.: Metro connections obtained from the official Mexico City Metro system map.; Accessibility obtained from the Mexico City Metro system map. In some cases, the map omits the accessibility icon as the station(s) are actually partially accessible. However, the respective websites of each station on the official site indicate the respective accessibility methods. Stations with the symbol are fully accessible; stations with the symbol are partially accessible.; Cablebús obtained from their official website.; Centro de transferencia modal (CETRAM;) obtained from the official website of the Órgano Regulador de Transporte.; Ecobici obtained from their official website.; Metrobús obtained from the Mexico City Metrobús system map.; Mexibús obtained from the official Mexico City Metro system map.; Mexicable obtained from the official Mexico City Metro system map.; Public buses network (peseros) obtained from the official website of the Órgano Regulador de Transporte.; Red de Transporte de Pasajeros obtained from their official website.; Trolleybuses obtained from their official website.)
Handicapped/disabled access	Fully accessible station	Cablebús Line {{{3}}}	Cablebús connection	Red de Transporte de Pasajeros	RTP connection
Handicapped/disabled access	Partially accessible station	Mexibús	Mexibús connection	Tren Interurbano	Tren Interurbano connection
Transfer hub	CETRAM transfer station	Mexicable	Mexicable connection	Tren Suburbano	Tren Suburbano connection
Transfer hub	ETRAM transfer station	Mexico City Metro	Mexico City Metro connection	Trolleybus	Trolleybus connection
Ecobici	Ecobici bikeshare	Mexico City minubus	Pesero connection	Mexico City Light Rail	Mexico City Light Rail connection

==== Line 1 ====
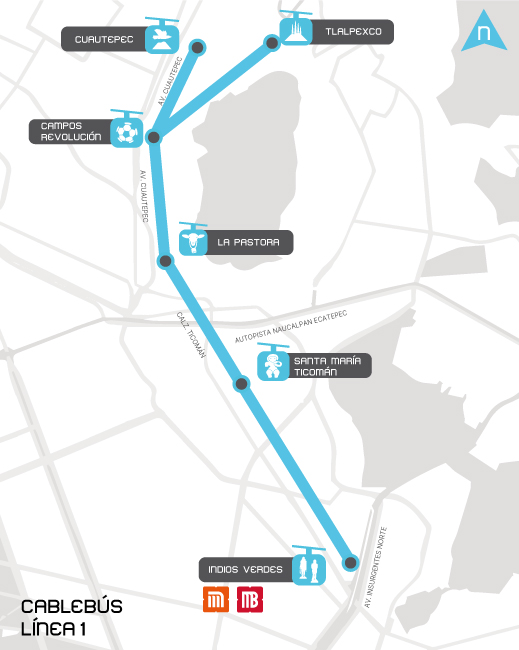
Line 1

Line 1 is located in the northernmost borough of Gustavo A. Madero. It runs 9.2 kilometers (5.7 mi) from the area serving the Indios Verdes STC Metro station to the Campos Revolución STC Metro station, where the line divides into two cables for transfer, one toward Cuautepec station and the other toward Tlalpexco station, in the Cerro del Chiquihuite. The ropeway installation for Line 1 was built by Doppelmayr Mexico. The cabins are the OMEGA V cabins by CWA Constructions, which have won a Red Dot Award for their outstanding design.

Icon	Stations (Note: All the stations are fully accessible to people with disabilities.)	Connection(s)	Picture	Date opened
	Indios Verdes	101, 101A, 101B, 101D, 102, 107B (at distance), 108		11 July 2021
	Ticomán	101, 102, 108		11 July 2021
	La Pastora	101, 101A, 101B, 101D, 102, 103, 104, 108		11 July 2021
	Campos Revolución	101, 101A, 101B 101D, 102, 103		4 March 2021
	Cuautepec	101, 101A, 101B, 101D, 102, 103, 104		11 July 2021
	Tlalpexco			4 March 2021

==== Line 2 ====
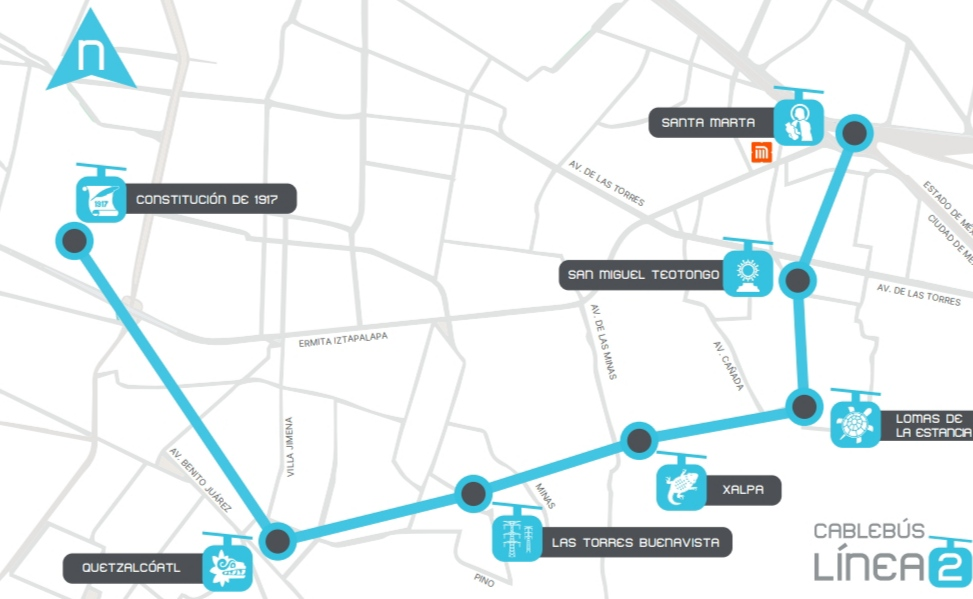
Line 2

Line 2 is located in the eastern borough of Iztapalapa. It runs 10.55 kilometers (6.56 mi) from the area serving the Constitución de 1917 metro station to Santa Marta metro station, passing through the southern neighborhoods of the borough. It is the longest public cable car line in the world. The Line is divided in two sections and commuters have to get off at Xalpa station if they want to continue their ride.

Icon	Stations	Connection(s)	Picture	Date opened
	Constitución de 1917	1D, 47A, 57A, 57C, 159, 161, 161C, 161D, 161E, 161F, 162, 165A; 4B		8 August 2021
	Quetzalcóatl	161E		8 August 2021
	Las Torres Buenavista			8 August 2021
	Xalpa	161C		8 August 2021
	Lomas de la Estancia	161		8 August 2021
	San Miguel Teotongo	163, 163B		8 August 2021
	Santa Marta	1D, 52C		8 August 2021

==== Line 3 ====
The project was originally planned to have four stations that would connect all four Chapultepec park sections, in Miguel Hidalgo.

On 20 July 2021, the tender for the first stage of the line was presented, which will have a length of 5.42 km, 180 cabins and 6 stations: Los Pinos, Panteón Dolores, CECyT 4 / Lienzo Charro, Parque Cri-Cri, Cineteca Nacional and Vasco de Quiroga. The planned number of station was later increased to eleven and expanded to the high areas of the neighboring borough of Álvaro Obregón. It was expected to conclude in December 2023, but it opened in September 2024.

The line had a ridership of 35,000 to 36,000 daily passengers in October 2024; some locals complained that on weekends, tourist numbers resulted in long lines.

Icon	Stations	Connection(s)	Borough	Picture	Date opened
	Los Pinos/Constituyentes	34A; 8C	Miguel Hidalgo		24 September 2024
	Panteón de Dolores		Miguel Hidalgo		24 September 2024
	Charrería		Miguel Hidalgo		24 September 2024
	PARCUR/Colegio de Arquitectos		Álvaro Obregón		24 September 2024
	Cineteca Nacional/Bodega de Arte		Álvaro Obregón		24 September 2024
	Vasco de Quiroga	El Insurgente; 115, 118	Álvaro Obregón		24 September 2024

=== Future lines ===
==== Line 4 ====
The line is planned to go from Coyoacán to Tlalpan, southwestern Mexico City.

Stations (Note: Planned names)	Connection(s)	Borough	Picture	Date opened
Universidad	17E, 123A, 125, 128, 134C, 134D, 162D; 2E; Pumabús (services Ciudad Universitaria)	Coyoacán		In planning
Cantera		Coyoacán		In planning
Perisur	57A	Coyoacán		In planning
Campo Xóchitl		Tlalpan		In planning
CEFORMA		Tlalpan		In planning
Deportivo Independencia		Tlalpan		In planning
Cultura Maya		Tlalpan		In planning
Pedregal de San Nicolás		Tlalpan		In planning

==== Line 5 ====
The line is proposed to go from Magdalena Contreras to Álvaro Obregón and Benito Juárez. It proposes to have nine stations. It would have two branches, one toward Valentin Campa metro station, in Álvaro Obregón, and the second one toward Mixcoac metro station, in Benito Juárez.

Stations (Note: Planned names)	Connection(s)	Picture	Date opened
Oyamel			In planning
San Bernabé			In planning
Cruz Verde			In planning
La Angostura			In planning
San Clemente			In planning
Lomas de Tarango			In planning
Olivar del Conde			In planning
Valentín Campa	(under construction)		In planning
Mixcoac	1D, 13A, 115A, 116, 119B, 124, 124A, 200; 21A		In planning

==== Line 6 ====
The line is planned to go from Tláhuac metro station to the borough of Milpa Alta and seven stations are projected.

Stations (Note: Planned names)	Connection(s)	Borough	Picture	Date opened
Tláhuac	141, 148, 149	Tláhuac		In planning
San José		Tláhuac		In planning
Santiago Tulyehualco		Xochimilco		In planning
San Juan Ixtayopan		Tláhuac		In planning
San Antonio Tecómitl		Milpa Alta		In planning
San Francisco Tecoxpa		Milpa Alta		In planning
Villa Milpa Alta		Milpa Alta		In planning

== See also ==
- Mexicable, a similar system operating in the neighboring State of Mexico.
