= Zapotec Totems =

- City: Mexico City, Mexico
- League: Liga Mexicana Élite
- Founded: 2010
- Head coach: Kevin Marcin

The Zapotec Totems were a semi-professional ice hockey team in Mexico City, Mexico. They played in the Liga Mexicana Élite.

== History ==
The club founded in 2010, and joined the LME for the 2010-11 season. They finished in last place in the regular season, and did not qualify for the league playoffs.

== Season-by-Season Results ==
Season	GP	W	L	SOW	SOL	Pts	GF	GA	Place	Playoffs
2010-11	12	2	7	3	0	12	27	44	4th	Did not qualify

== Roster ==
G: Andres de la Garma #1
G: Agustin Grimaldi #2
D: Dior Miller #3 (C)
D: Aldo Shiavón #18
D: Francisco Padilla #8
D: Raúl Bonilla #11
D: Miguel Pórter #14 (A)
D: Emmanuel Cardozo #15
F: Eduardo Glennie #5
F: Oscar Flores #9
F: Alejandro Frade #10
F: Estéfano Bonfante #13
F: Roberto Sánchez #4
F: Ander Barberena #6 (A)
F: Juan Pablo Desayve #7
F: Jorge Ehlers #16
F: Roger Garza #12
F: Alejandro García #19
F: Sebastián Ortega #17
