= Aztec Eagle Warriors =

- City: Mexico City, Mexico
- League: Liga Mexicana Elite de Hockey
- Founded: 2010
- Home arena: Centro Santa Fe
- Colors: Black and gold
- Head coach: (Mexico) Luis Olivares
Home colours

The Aztec Eagle Warriors are a semi-professional ice hockey team in Mexico City, Mexico. They play in the Liga Mexicana Elite de Hockey.

== History ==
The club was founded in 2010, and joined the Liga Mexicana Elite the same season. They finished in second place in the regular season, but lost in the semifinals to the Teotihuacan Priests 2 games to none.

== Season-by-Season Results ==
Season	GP	W	L	SOW	SOL	Pts	GF	GA	Place	Playoffs
2010-11	12	7	4	1	0	23	33	24	2nd	Lost semifinals

== Roster ==
GK: Alfonso De Alba
GK: Paulo Rivera
D: Alejandro Rosette (C)
D: Miguel Colás
D: Miguel Rivacoba
D: Ángel Sánchez
D: Alejandro Escalante
D: Herman Rash
F: Alfredo Ibarra
F: Roberto Chabat (A)
F: Diego Linares
F: Rodrigo Olagaray
F: César Durán
F: Rodrigo Cepeda
F: Carlos Vargas
F: Oscar Rubio (A)
F: Andrés Valenzuela
F: Eduardo Flegman
F: Hernando Chávez
F: Zachary Manz
F: Panagiotis Mavridis
