= Mid-luxury =

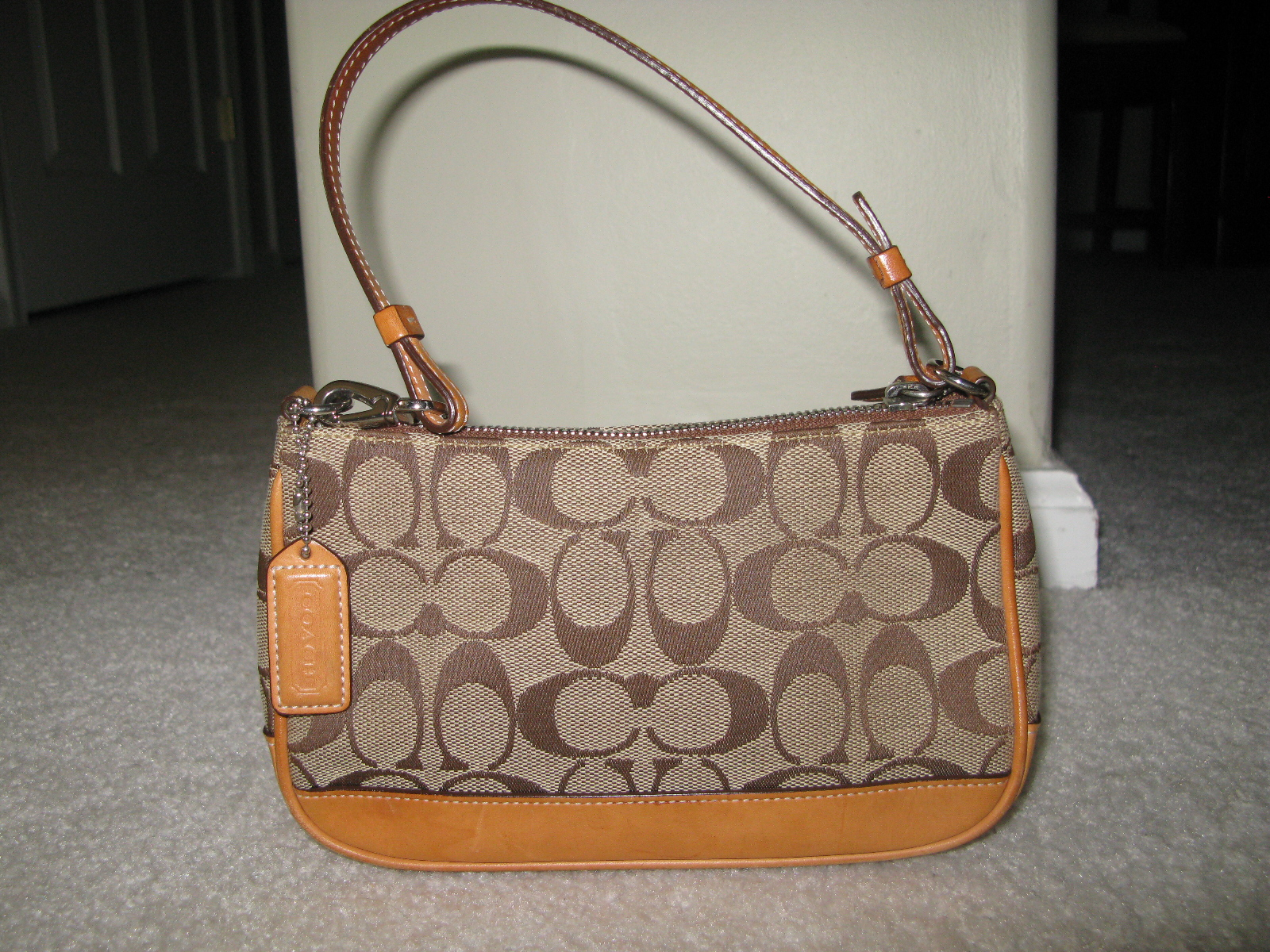
Coach handbag; Coach is often cited as a mid-luxury fashion brand.

Mid-luxury is a term applied in the U.S. market to fashion, vehicles, hotels, apartments, and other consumer goods and services, for brands that are not as expensive as luxury goods, but more expensive than mass market brands.

== Fashion ==
Fashion brands identified as mid-luxury in the U.S. market include Brooks Brothers, Coach, Hugo Boss, Lacoste, Tommy Hilfiger, and Ralph Lauren. Indochino is a manufacturer, selling mid-luxury custom-made business shirts direct to consumers.

== Amazon ==
As of 2018, Amazon U.S. has been struggling to get luxury brands to sell on its platform, but has had success with selling its house brands, such as Pinzon (sheets and other domestics) targeted at the mid-luxury market.
