= Zinacantepec railway station =

Commuter rail station in the State of Mexico

Zinacantepec
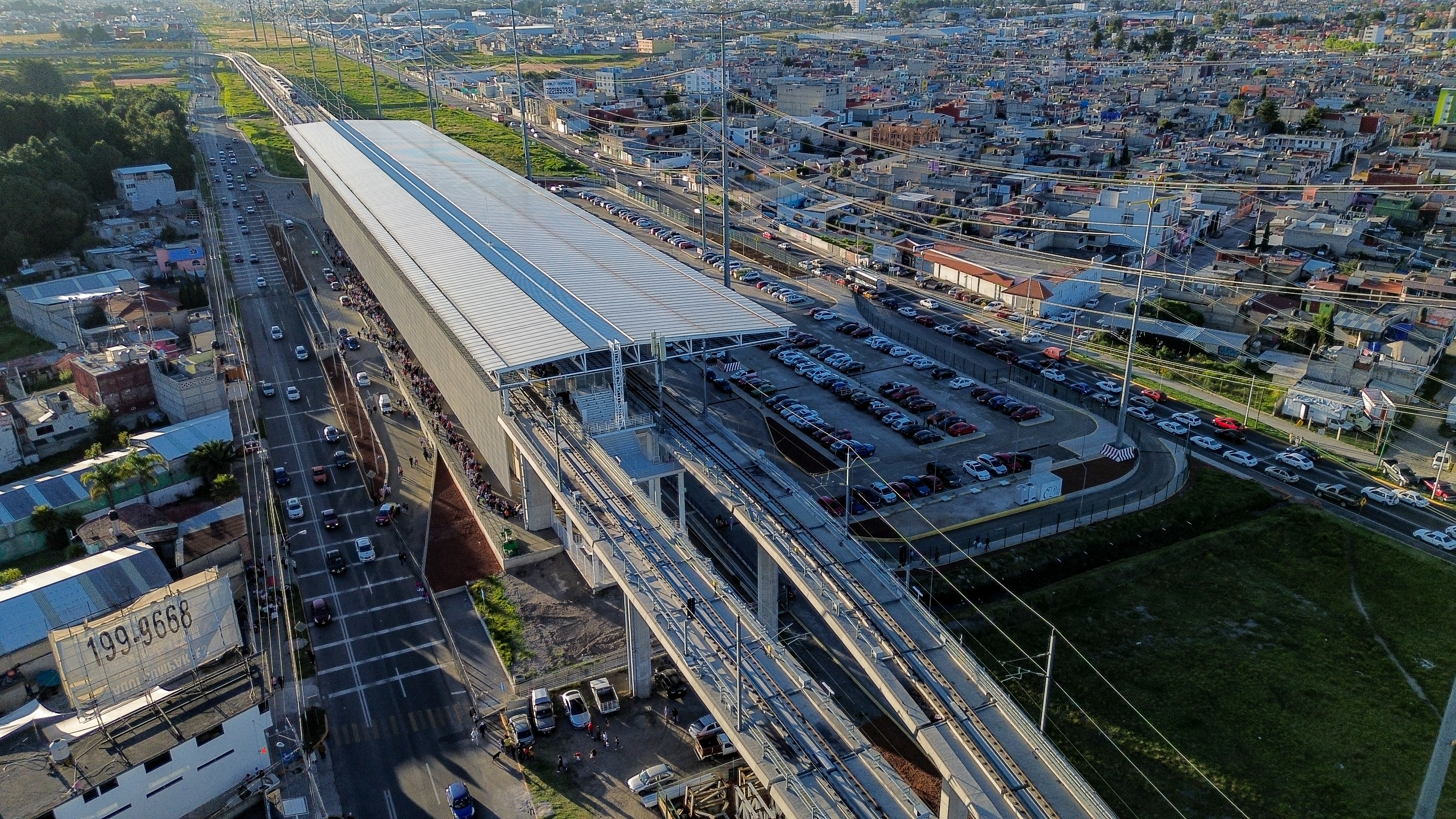
- Aerial view of Zinacantepec station

General information
- Location: Boulevard Solidaridad Las Torres; Toluca, State of Mexico; Mexico
- Coordinates: 19.2802083°N 99.694792°W
- System: Commuter rail
- Owner: Government of Mexico
- Operator: SICT
- Line: El Insurgente
- Platforms: 1 island platform
- Tracks: 2
- Connections: Planned transport hub; Various intercity bus service routes

Construction
- Structure type: Elevated
- Parking: Parking lot
- Accessible: Yes

Other information
- Status: In service

History
- Opened: 15 September 2023

Services
Preceding station	Tren Interurbano	Following station
Terminus	El Insurgente	Toluca Centro toward Observatorio
Route map
Location
- Location within State of Mexico
- Area map

The Zinacantepec railway station (Note: Estación Zinacantepec; lit. transl. Zinacantepec station. Mexican Spanish pronunciation: [sinakanteˈpek]. The etymology comes from the Nahuatl language, "At the Bat Hill".) is a commuter railway station serving the El Insurgente commuter rail system that connects Greater Toluca, State of Mexico, with Mexico City. The station is located along Boulevard Solidaridad Las Torres, in the municipality of Toluca, a few meters away from the adjacent municipality of Zinacantepec, and it serves as the western terminus of the line.

Zinacantepec railway station opened on 15 September 2023, with eastward service towards Lerma railway station. It is an elevated station with one island platform; the facilities are accessible to people with disabilities.

== Location and layout ==
Zinacantepec railway station is a commuter railway station located along Boulevard Solidaridad Las Torres, in Toluca de Lerdo, the capital of the State of Mexico, near the limits shared with the municipality of Zinacantepec, and near the Parque Alameda 2000 state park.

The area is serviced by multiple intercity bus service routes, including some which go to the municipalities of San Mateo Atenco and Lerma. The line's workshop and the respective railyard are located after the station. When the station opened, it became a hotspot for street vendors.

The station was built above ground level. It has a disabled-accessible service with elevators, escalators, tactile pavings, access ramps, braille signage plates, as well as visual signage and auditive announcements.
