= Centro Santa Fe =

Shopping mall in Mexico City

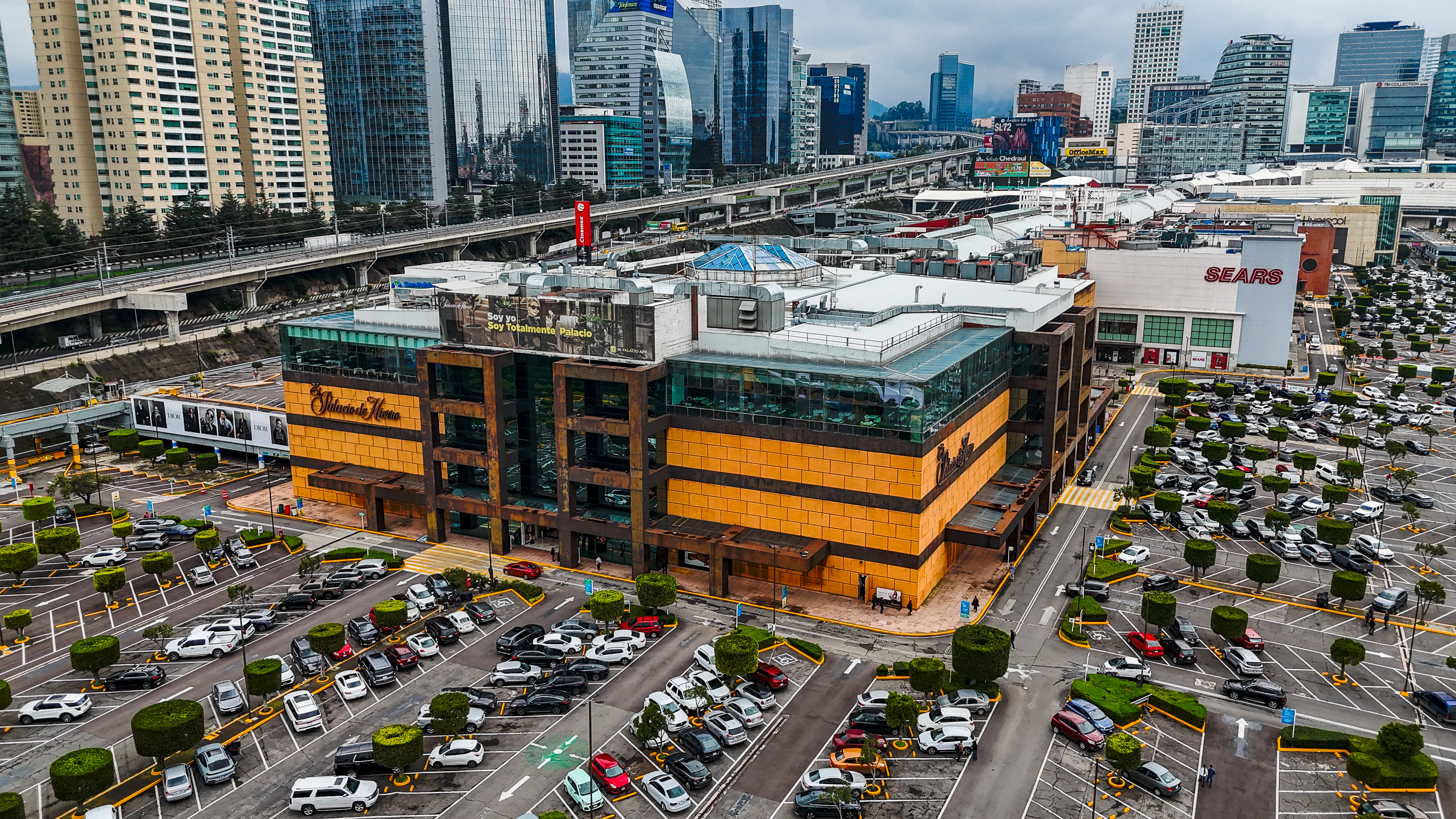
- Centro Santa Fe in 2024

General information
- Location: Mexico City, Mexico
- Coordinates: 19.362383°N 99.272235°W
- Opening: 1993

Technical details
- Floor area: 210,400 square metres (2,265,000 sq ft)

Other information
- Number of stores: 500
- Number of anchors: 6
- Public transit access: Santa Fe railway station

Website
- centrosantafe.com.mx

Centro Santa Fe (Note: English: Santa Fe Center or Santa Fe Mall) is a large 210,400-square-metre (2,264,727 sq ft) enclosed shopping mall in the Santa Fe area in the far west side of Mexico City. Centro Santa Fe is the largest shopping center in Mexico. The original mall, 128,367 m^{2} (1,381,730 sq ft), cost 270 billion old Mexican pesos (270 million current pesos) in 1993. It was further expanded in 2012.

Within the Centro Santa Fe, two floors above the Sears wing are separately branded as Vía Santa Fe, containing mid-luxury clothing retailers (e.g. Salvatore Ferragamo, La Martina, Dolce & Gabbana), a Cinemex "Platinum" luxury multi-cinema, Casa Palacio (home store run by El Palacio de Hierro), and Mexico's first Apple Store.

Anchors in the main mall are El Palacio de Hierro, Liverpool, Sanborns and Sears department stores, and a Chedraui Select hypermarket.

As a whole, the mall has about 501 stores in total.

As of 2012 the center as a whole had about 1,500,000 visitors per month or 20 million per year.
