= Street vendors in Mexico City =

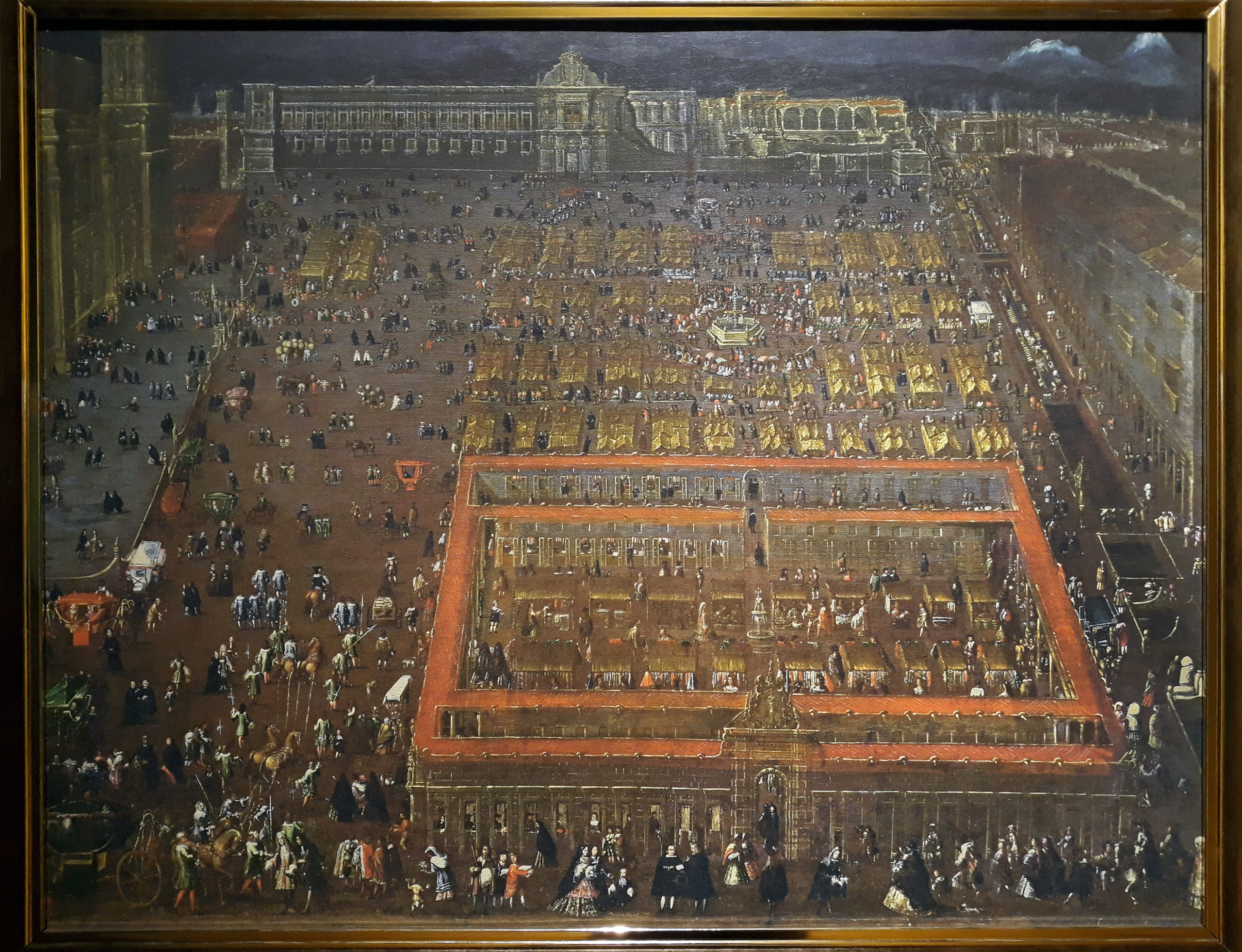
Cristóbal de Villalpando View of the Plaza Mayor of Mexico city (1695), with market sellers in the main plaza

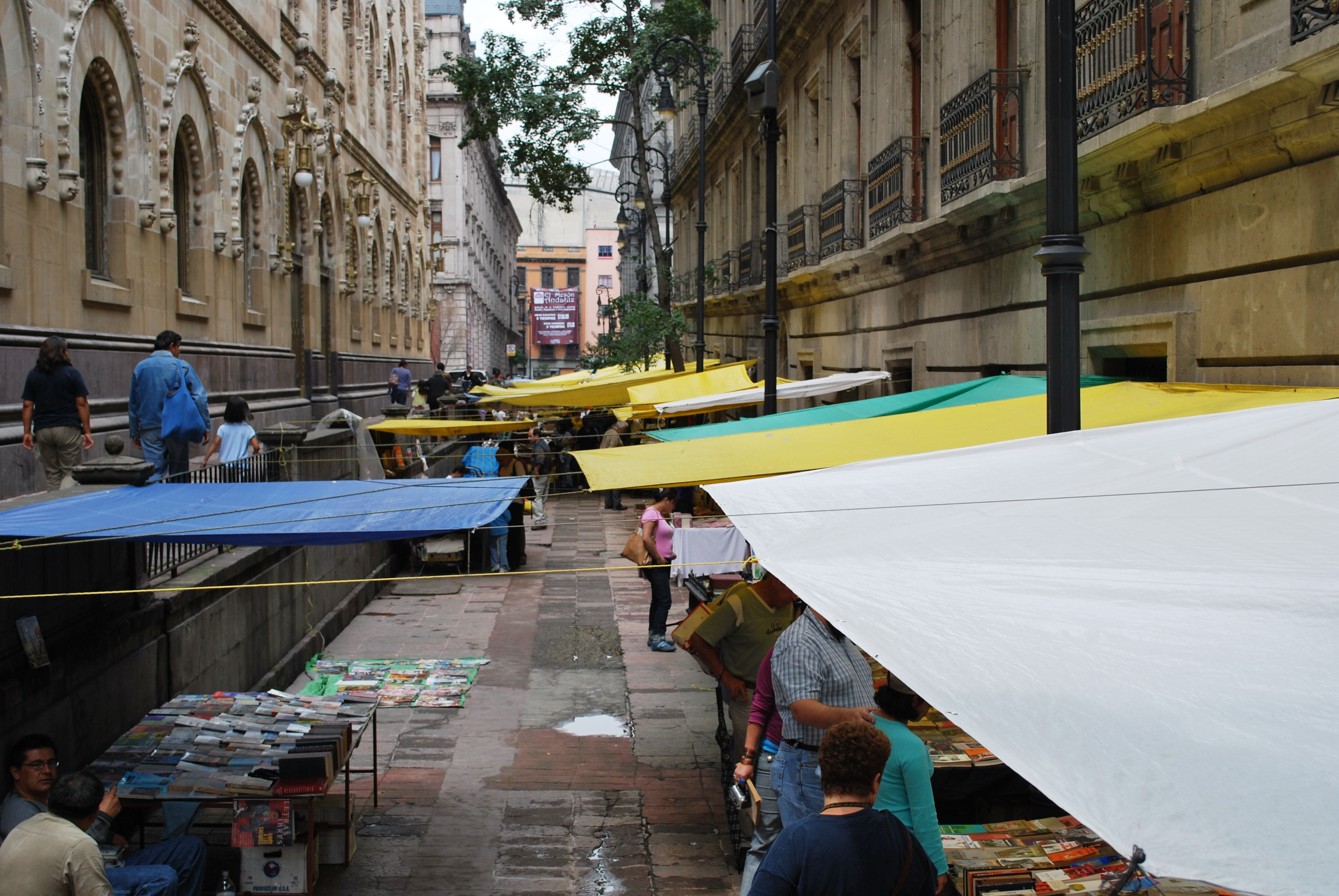
Informal markets are found in public spaces throughout the city

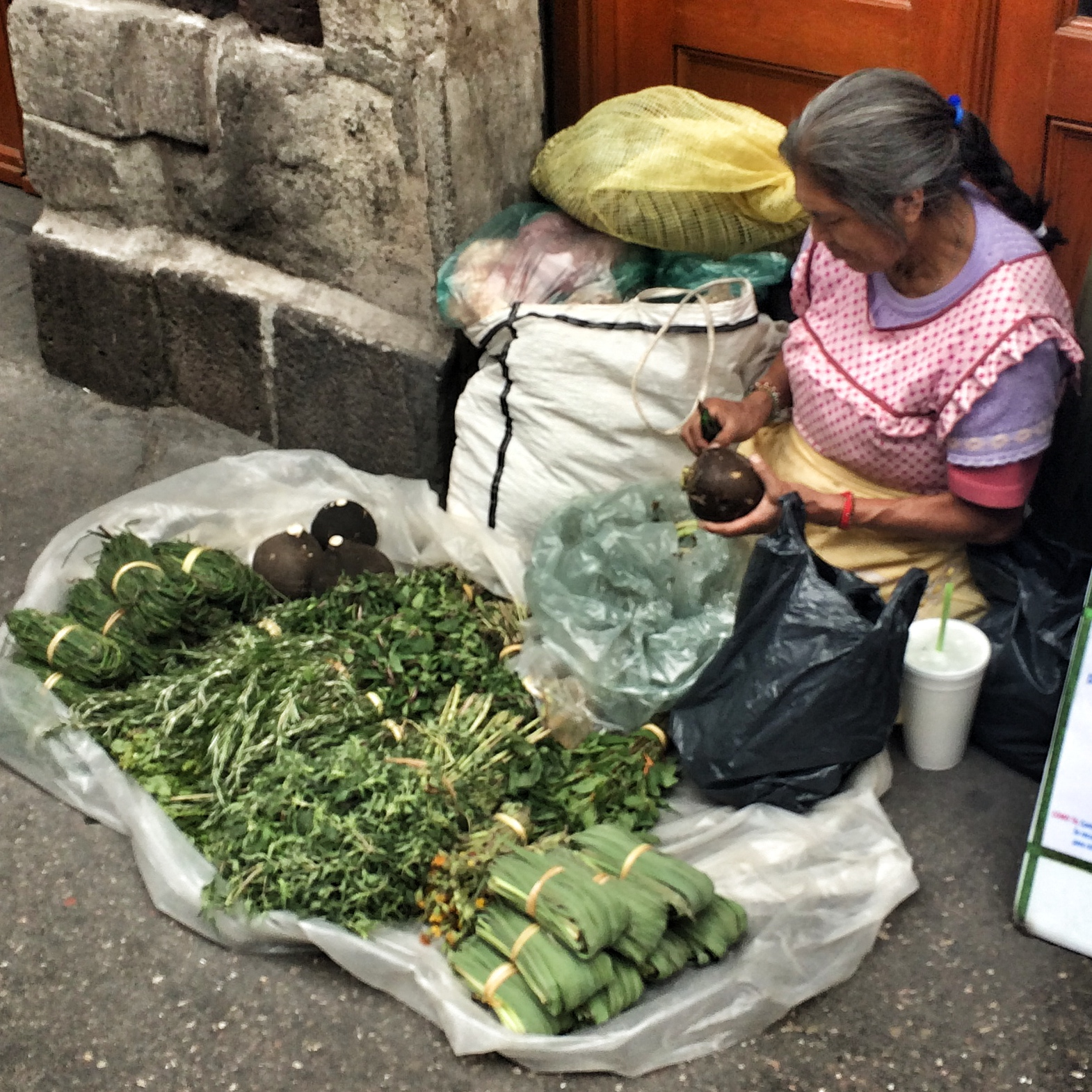
Woman selling herbs in Mexico City's Historic Center

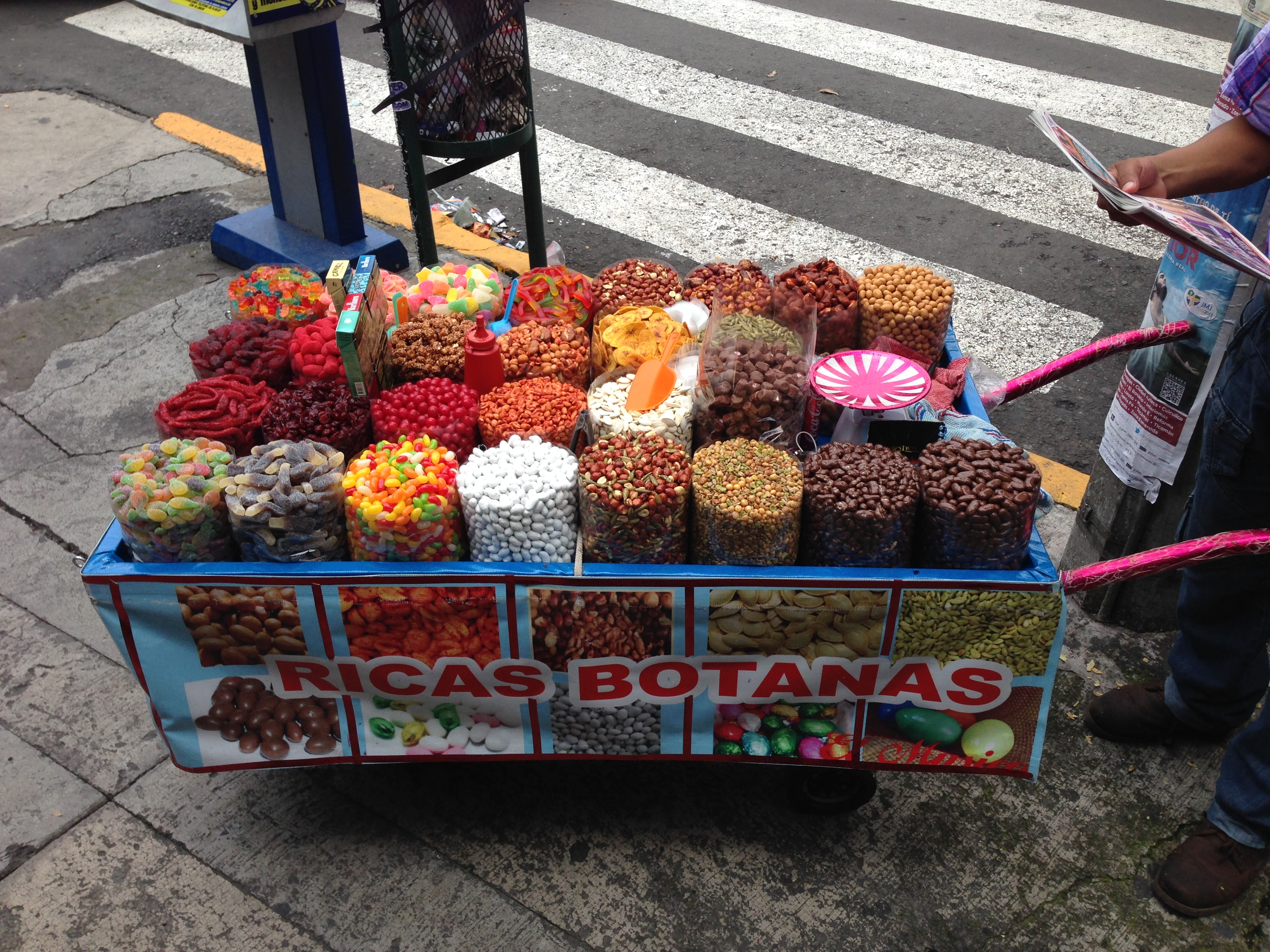
Candy and nuts sold from a pushcart in Colonia Roma

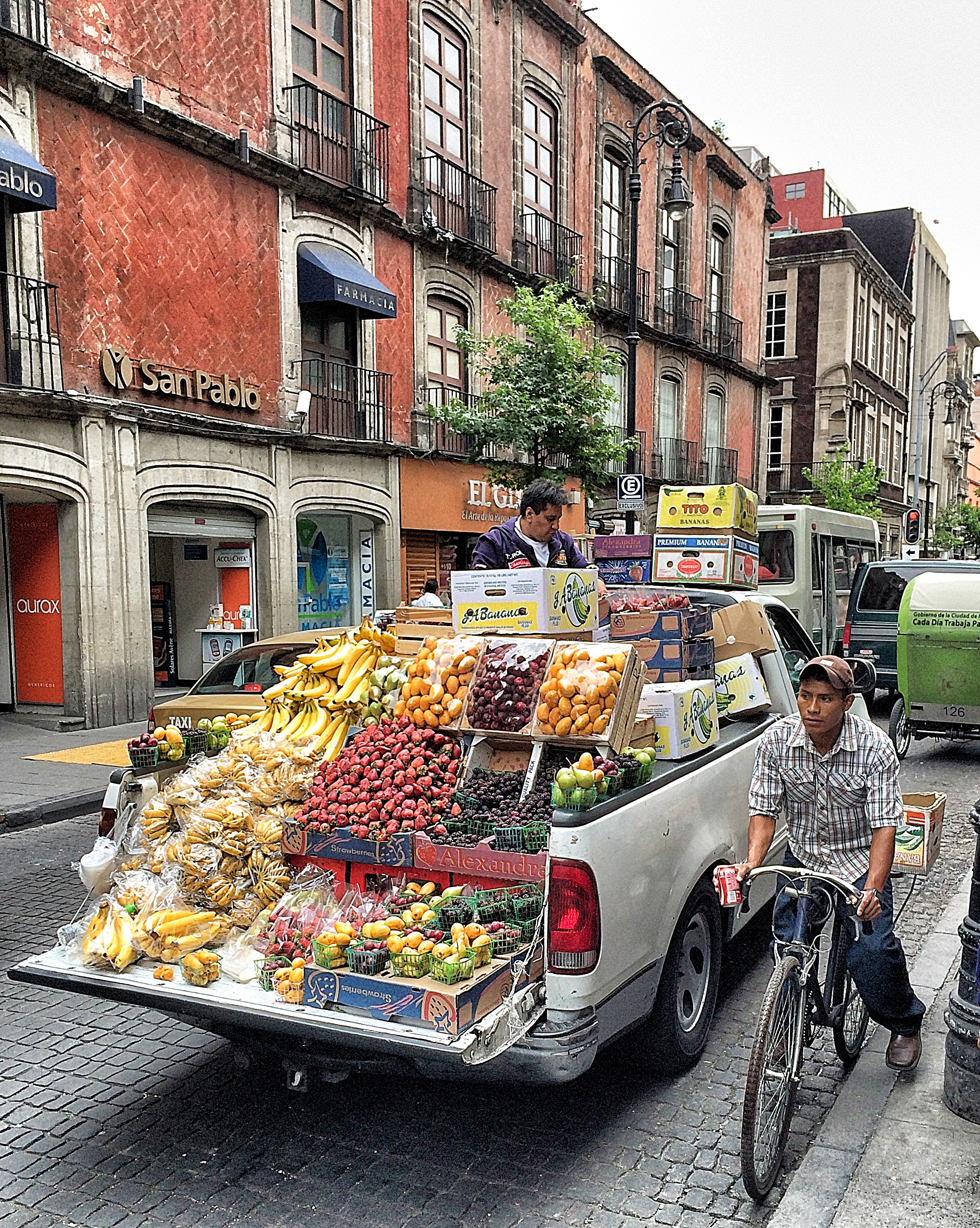
Vendor selling fruit from the back of a truck in the Historic Center of Mexico City

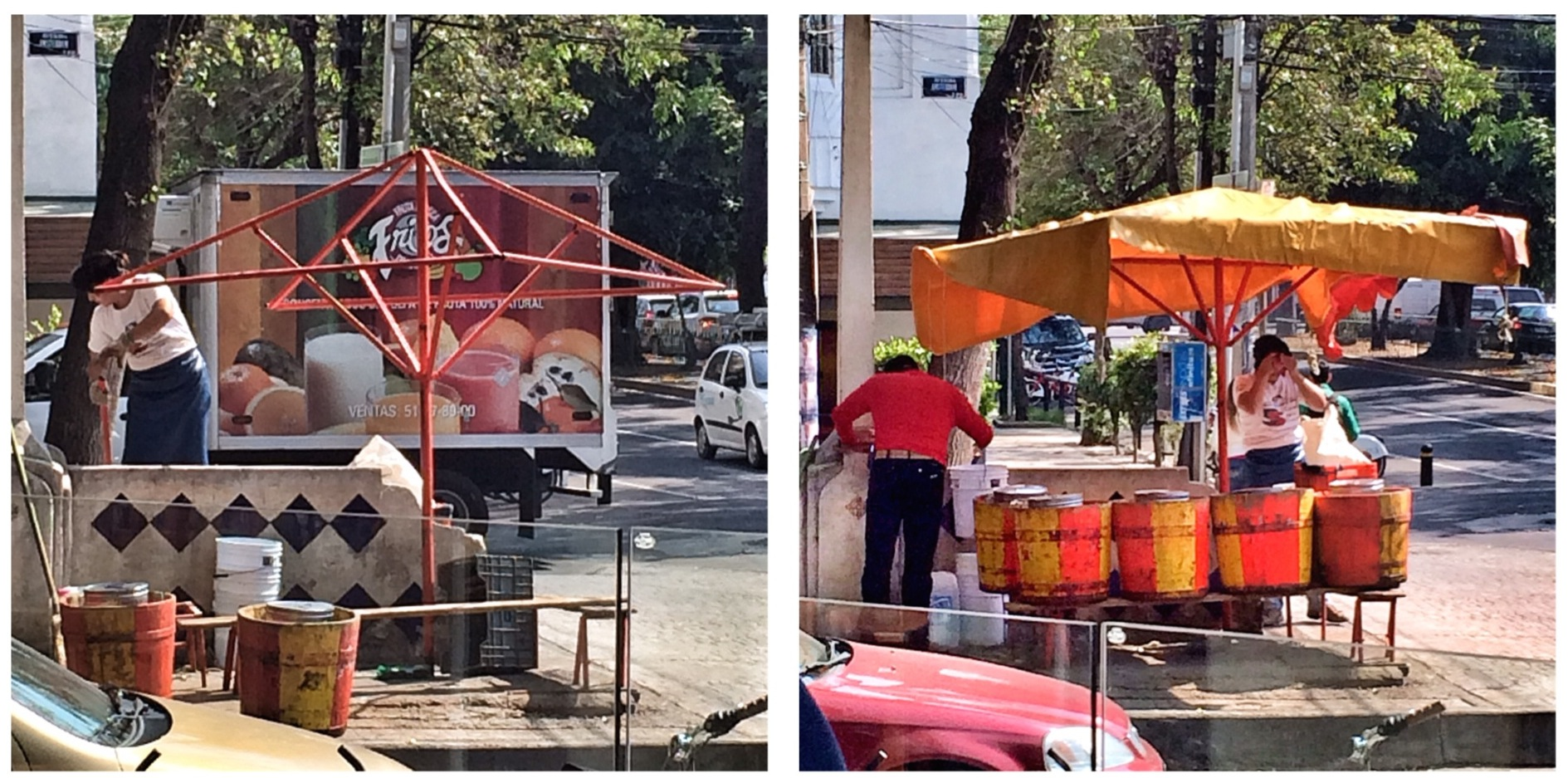
Setting up an ice cream stand on Avenida Ámsterdam in Condesa

The presence of street vendors in Mexico City (known locally in Mexican Spanish as ambulantes) dates back to pre-Hispanic era and over the centuries the government has struggled to control it, with most recently a clearing of downtown streets of vendors in 2007, but despite this there is a persistent presence of many thousands illegally. Even after oscillating between the realms of legality and illegality, street vending in Mexico and even in other parts of the world, is not the exception but rather has been a norm when it comes to commercial activities. In 2003, it was estimated that there were 199,328 street vendors in Mexico City.

== History ==
Prior to the Spanish conquest of the Aztec Empire, commercial activity primarily took place in the tianguis or marketplaces. In New Spain, outside of the controlled mercado or market on the Zócalo and other squares, street vendors emerged, then called buhoneros. Efforts to control street vendors date back to at least 1541, when the city government prohibited itinerant vendors.

The 1970s and 1980s saw a huge growth in the number of vendors.

In 1993, the first of several major efforts (each only partially successful) to reduce street vending in the Historic Center of Mexico City began, with the removal of about 10,000 vendors from the streets and construction of markets (plazas comerciales) to re-accommodate them, as well as subject them to tax codes, health regulations and otherwise pay the full "costs of formality."

In 1998 guidelines attempting to formalize and bring order to the sector were published as the Programa de Reordenamiento del Comercio en Via Publica, or Program for the Reordering of Trade in the Public Streets, however street vending continued to grow. Efforts to remove the vendors eventually failed as vendors returned to the streets. During the 1990s and 2000s street vendors have paid union leaders "dues" in exchange for the right to occupy a piece of sidewalk without city permission, an illegal act. The unions in turn, bribed and lobbied city officials to allow the vendors to stay.

Finally, in October 2007 the streets of the Historic Center were cleared of vendors with much success, which was considered a victory for mayor Marcelo Ebrard. However, toreros (literally "bullfighters") remain active in the area — people who sell merchandise from a tarp on the ground which converts to a bag that they can carry the merchandise in and carry it away when police show up to clear illegal street vendors.

== Types of street vendors and products ==
Street vendors in a variety of formats, with items sold from:

- baskets, particularly sandwiches, tacos,
- pushcarts, particularly prepared fruit and coconut water
- the backs of trucks (lorries), particularly fruit and toilet paper
- a tarp or cloth laid on the ground
- stalls

Vendors selling from stalls may be organized into a number of formats:

- tianguis and mobile markets (mercados sobre ruedas): These markets take place in a designated place on certain days of the week, with a fixed schedule and supervised by a city inspector for compliance with weights and measurements. These markets are part of the strategy for the supply and distribution of food staples to the city.
- Concentrations: areas of vendors selling from stalls, not officially organized, specializing in certain types of products, such as imported illegal merchandise or fayuca, especially electronics, in Tepito, or auto parts, tools, clothing, etc. Although in many cases those selling from stalls are not truly itinerant (ambulante, in Spanish) - they are still referred to as ambulantes. Concentrations of stalls are also found at metro station entrances, near hospital entrances etc.
- Bazaars (plazas comerciales), where vendors of a certain "theme" (stationery) are housed; originally these were organized to accommodate vendors formerly selling on the street
- Individual or small groups of stalls on any given city sidewalk

== Numbers ==
A 2013 study revealed just in the Historic Center of Mexico City:

- 25,000 vendors
- 150 blocks of the Historic Center where informal vendors were present
- 70% of the toreros coming from the State of Mexico
- 60 organizations controlling the vendors

A 2003 INEGI study showed 199,328 street vendors in Mexico City proper (Mexican Federal District).

A study in the mid-1990s estimated the number of street vendors as follows:

- Total full-time street vendors: 185,600. This number excludes those who occasionally sell in the street or who add to the numbers during peak commercial seasons, and the study estimated that if included they would probably add at least 50 per cent to the figure.
- Concentrations: 1,500 stalls on the street or sidewalks (not counting 10,500 stalls in empty lots) Rotating Markets: 38,000 stalls
- Ambulatory: 67,248 stalls
- Metro stations: 5,000 stalls
- Street corners/neighborhoods: 10,000
- Total stalls: 121,738.

– Source:
