= Observatorio railway station =

Commuter rail station in Mexico City

Observatorio
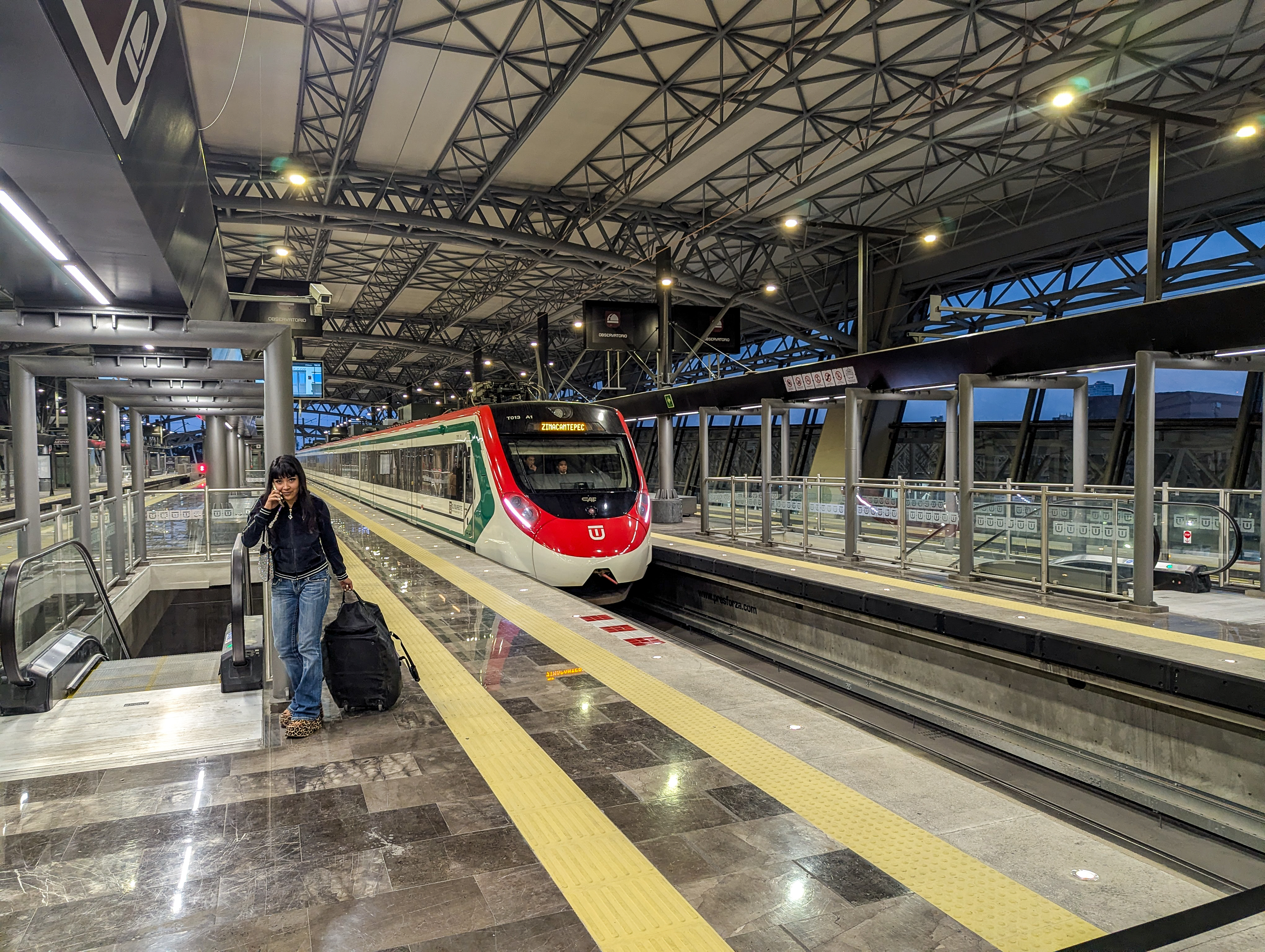

General information
- Location: Calzada Minas de Arena; Álvaro Obregón, Mexico City; Mexico
- Coordinates: 19.398594°N 99.200763°W
- System: Commuter rail
- Owner: Government of Mexico
- Operator: SICT
- Line: El Insurgente
- Platforms: 1 island platform
- Tracks: 2
- Connections: Observatorio; Observatorio; West Bus Terminal

Construction
- Structure type: Elevated
- Parking: Yes
- Accessible: Yes

Other information
- Status: In use

History
- Opened: 2 February 2026

Services
Preceding station	Tren Interurbano	Following station
Vasco de Quiroga toward Zinacantepec	El Insurgente	Terminus
Route map
Location
- Location within Mexico City
- Area map

The Observatorio railway station (Note: Estación Observatorio; Spanish pronunciation: [oβseɾβaˈtoɾjo]. The name of the station means observatory in Spanish.) is a commuter railway station and eastern terminal of the El Insurgente commuter rail system. It connects Mexico City with Greater Toluca, State of Mexico. The station is located along Calzada Minas de Arena, in Álvaro Obregón, Mexico City. The station connects with the Mexico City Metro system at Observatorio, its own Centro de transferencia modal, a transportation hub from which multiple buses and minubuses depart and arrive, as well as the adjacent intercity West Bus Terminal. It opened on 2 February 2026.

== Location and layout ==
Observatorio railway station is a commuter railway station located along Calzada Minas de Arena, in Álvaro Obregón, Mexico City. The station was built above ground level. It has a disabled-accessible service with elevators, escalators, tactile pavings, access ramps, braille signage plates, as well as visual signage and auditive announcements.

The area is served by the Observatorio station of the Mexico City Metro, which connects to Line 1, and Line 12 in the future. The station also provides access to the adjacent Centro de transferencia modal (CETRAM), a major transportation hub linking multiple areas of Mexico City and the neighboring State of Mexico, as well as the Terminal de Autobuses de Observatorio, which provides intercity bus service.

== Incidents ==
During construction of the overpass near Presa Tacubaya, a segment-launching gantry crane collapsed; no injuries were reported. The incident drew national attention after the Government of Mexico City reported and described the collapse as having "shifted toward the ground", a phrasing that was criticized as a euphemism.
