= Zapotitlán metro station =

Mexico City Metro station

Zapotitlán
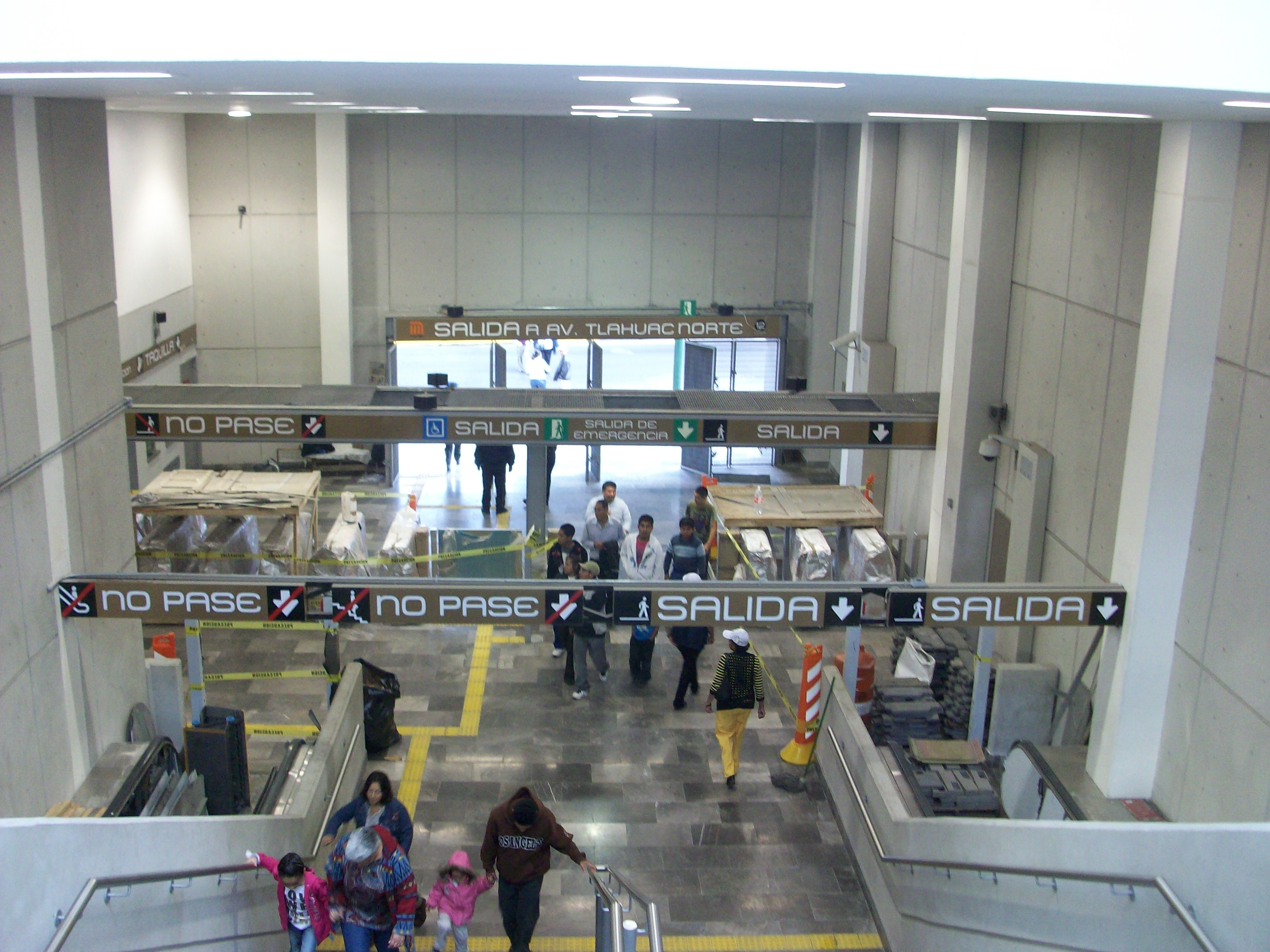
- Entrance and lobby, 2012

General information
- Location: Tláhuac Avenue; Tláhuac, Mexico City; Mexico
- Coordinates: 19°17′48″N 99°02′04″W
- System: Mexico City Metro
- Owner: Government of Mexico City
- Operator: Sistema de Transporte Colectivo (STC)
- Platforms: 2 side platforms
- Tracks: 2
- Connections: Routes: 162, 162-D

Construction
- Structure type: Elevated
- Cycle facilities: Bicycle parking-only
- Accessible: Yes

Other information
- Status: In service

History
- Opened: 30 October 2012; 14 years ago

Key dates
- 12 March 2014; 12 years ago: Temporarily closed
- 29 November 2015; 10 years ago: Reopened
- 19 September 2017; 9 years ago: Temporarily closed
- 30 October 2017; 9 years ago: Reopened
- 3 May 2021; 5 years ago: Temporarily closed
- 30 January 2024; 2 years ago: Reopened

Passengers
- 2025: 4,272,482 (Note: The data here is limited to the most recent ten years to avoid excessive listings; earlier figures can be found in this page's history or on the Mexico City Metro website. To calculate the average daily ridership, the annual total is divided by 365 days (366 in leap years), with decimals omitted from the result. Each station per line is ranked individually, as the system counts transfer stations separately. The percentage change is calculated automatically using the data from the current year and the previous year.) ▲15.76%
- Rank: 123/195

Services
Preceding station	Mexico City Metro	Following station
Nopalera toward Mixcoac	Line 12	Tlaltenco toward Tláhuac
Route map
Location
- Location within Mexico City urban area
- Area map

Zapotitlán metro station (Note: Estación del Metro Zapotitlán. Mexican Spanish pronunciation: [sa.poti'tlan]. The etymology comes from the Nahuatl language, "between sapote trees".) is a station of the Mexico City Metro in the town of Santiago Zapotitlán and in the colonia (neighborhood) of Conchita Zapotitlán, in Tláhuac, Mexico City. It is an elevated station with two side platforms, served by Line 12 (the Golden Line), between Nopalera and Tlaltenco metro stations. The station's pictogram features the glyph of Santiago Zapotitlán, which shows a toothed sapote tree with three branches. The station was opened on 30 October 2012, on the first day of service between Tláhuac and Mixcoac metro stations.

The facilities are accessible to people with disabilities as there are elevators, tactile pavings and braille signage plates and there is a bicycle parking station. In 2019, the station had an average daily ridership of 13,683 passengers, making it the 13th busiest station on the line. Since it was opened, Zapotitlán station has had multiple incidents, including a 20-month closure in 2014 due to structural faults found in the elevated section of the line, a closure caused by the 19 September 2017 earthquake, and the subsequent collapse of the track near Olivos station in 2021.

== Location and station layout ==
Zapotitlán is a metro station along Tláhuac Avenue, located in the town of Santiago Zapotitlán and the colonia (Mexican Spanish for "neighborhood") of Conchita Zapotitlán, in the Tláhuac borough, in southeastern Mexico City. Within the system, the station lies between Nopalera and Tlaltenco metro stations. The facilities are accessible to people with disabilities as there are elevators, tactile pavings and braille signage plates and there is a bicycle parking station.

There are two exits: the northern one on the corner of Tláhuac Avenue and Cesáreo Castro Street, in the town of Santiago Zapotitlán, and the second on the opposite side of Tláhuac Avenue, on the corner of Emilio Laurent Street, on the colonia of Conchita Zapotitlán. Zapotitlán station has two levels: the station's platforms and the access lobby. The area is serviced by Routes 162 and 162-D of the Red de Transporte de Pasajeros network.

== History and construction ==
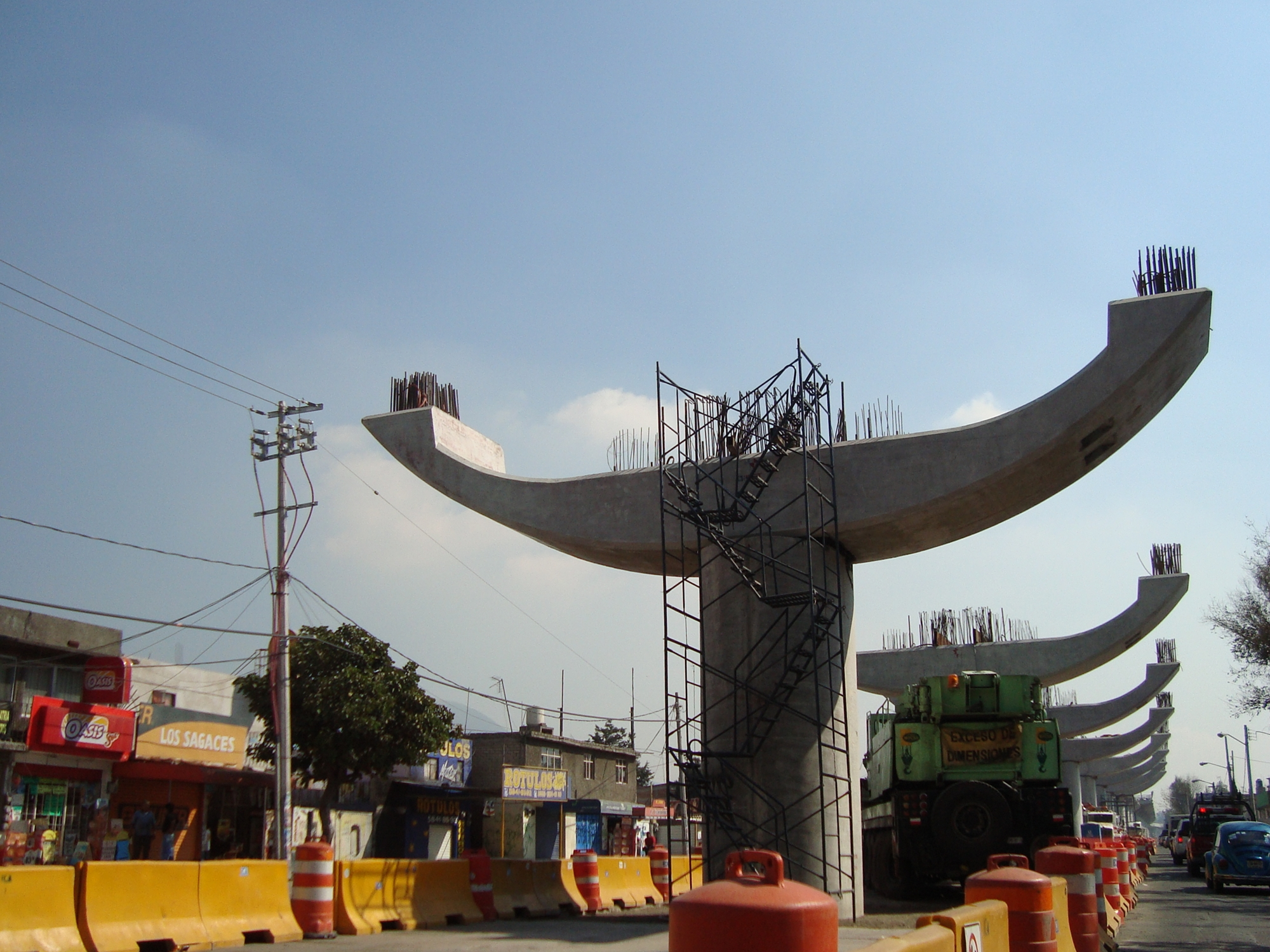
Support columns, 2010

Line 12 of the Mexico City Metro was built by Empresas ICA, in association with Alstom Mexicana and Grupo Carso. Zapotitlán is an elevated station; the Zapotitlán–Nopalera interstation is 1,276 m (4,186 ft) long, while the Zapotitlán–Tlaltenco section goes from overground to the street level, and measures 1,115 m (3,658 ft).

The station was opened on 30 October 2012, on the first day of the Mixcoac–Tláhuac service. Zapotitlán metro station is named after the town of Santiago Zapotitlán and its pictogram depicts the glyph of the town, which depicts an indented sapote tree with three branches. The tree is toothed, a reference to the Nahuatl word Tlantli (meaning 'tooth'), which is represented in the name of the station by the suffix -tlan.

=== Incidents ===
The original location was opposed by local residents and it ended up being changed. Since 2010, the Superior Auditor of the Federation has audited Line 12 several times and has reported several faults, like cracks and detachments along the line, including some at the Nopalera–Zapotitlán–Tlaltenco overpass.

From 12 March 2014 to 29 November 2015, Zapotitlán was closed due to technical and structural faults in the stretch Atlalilco–Tláhuac. After the 19 September 2017 earthquake damaged Line 12 tracks, Zapotitlán remained closed until 30 October 2017. In the zone, the earthquake derailed two trains: one in the Zapotitlán–Tlaltenco overpass and the other one on the opposite section; the latter damaged the track's seismic jacketing protection. On 3 May 2021, the station was closed after a portion of Line 12's elevated railway collapsed near Olivos station.

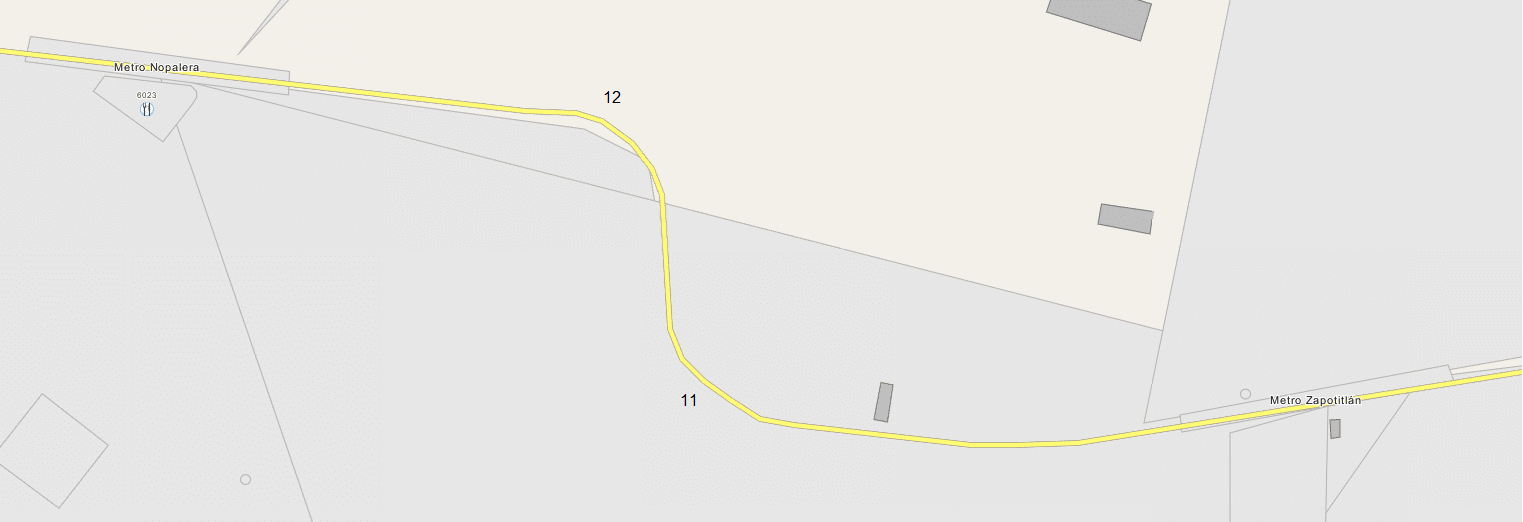
The system identified Curves 11 and 12 along Tláhuac Avenue as a railroad wear zone.

Between Zapotitlán and Nopalera metro stations there are two sharp curves close to each other; the system marks them as Curves 11 and 12. Curve 11 has a radius of 200 m (660 ft) while Curve 12 has a radius of 201.9 m (662 ft)—both are the tightest of the overpass. According to the Metro union leader, when there are sharp curves, the trains wear out the rails and wheels, causing them to clatter and damage structures such as girders and columns. After the 2017 earthquake, a girder in the section was reinforced with a diagonally-reinforced beam because a seismic top on Column 41 was damaged during the incident. The line uses FE-10 steel-wheeled trains by Construcciones y Auxiliar de Ferrocarriles. They have a length of 140 m (460 ft) and a width of 280 cm (110 in). According to the former director of the system, Joel Ortega, trains do not exit a curve when they are already on the next one, and the maximum speed for taking them was adjusted to 25 km/h (16 mph) for safe train travel but the speed wears and tears on the tracks and wheels. He also said that damage to the tracks had been reported since 2012 and that 900 m (3,000 ft) of track had been replaced within a month of its inauguration.

== Ridership ==
According to the data provided by the authorities, except for the years when the Zapotitlán metro station was closed for several months, commuters have averaged per year between 10,800 and 13,700 daily entrances. In 2019, before the impact of the COVID-19 pandemic on public transport, the station's ridership totaled 4,994,118 passengers, which represented an increase of 379,217 passengers compared to 2018. In the same year, Zapotitlán was the 130th busiest of the system's 195 stations, and it was the line's 13th busiest.

Annual passenger ridership
Year	Ridership	Average daily	Rank	% change	Ref.
2025	4,272,482	11,705	123/195	+15.76%	
2024	3,690,741	10,083	132/195	NA	
2023	0	0	188/195	NA	
2022	0	0	176/195	−100.00%	
2021	960,815	2,632	178/195	−69.78%	
2020	3,179,098	8,686	112/195	−36.34%	
2019	4,994,118	13,682	130/195	+8.22%	
2018	4,614,901	12,643	132/195	+16.91%	
2017	3,947,346	10,814	144/195	−4.53%	
2016	4,134,438	11,296	142/195	+1,209.66%	
