= Nopalera metro station =

Mexico City Metro station

Nopalera
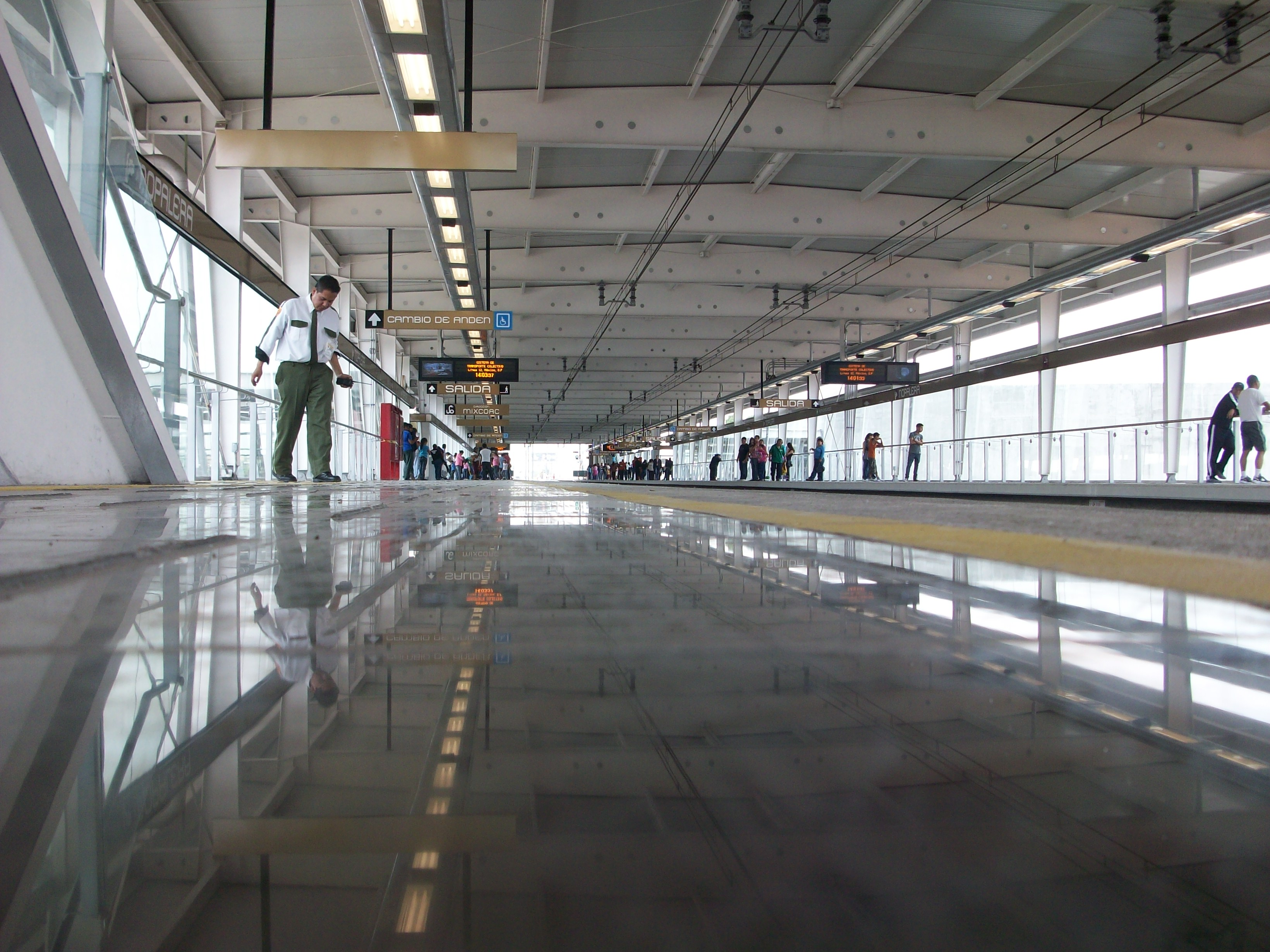
- Station platform, 2012

General information
- Location: Tláhuac Avenue; Tláhuac, Mexico City; Mexico
- Coordinates: 19.299970°N 99.046049°W
- System: Mexico City Metro
- Owner: Government of Mexico City
- Operator: Sistema de Transporte Colectivo (STC)
- Platforms: 2 side platforms
- Tracks: 2
- Connections: Route: 162

Construction
- Structure type: Elevated
- Cycle facilities: Bicycle parking-only
- Accessible: Yes

Other information
- Status: In service

History
- Opened: 30 October 2012; 14 years ago
- Former names: Francisco Villa (planned)

Key dates
- 12 March 2014; 12 years ago: Temporarily closed
- 29 November 2015; 10 years ago: Reopened
- 19 September 2017; 9 years ago: Temporarily closed
- 30 October 2017; 9 years ago: Reopened
- 3 May 2021; 5 years ago: Temporarily closed
- 30 January 2024; 2 years ago: Reopened

Passengers
- 2025: 7,737,864 (Note: The data here is limited to the most recent ten years to avoid excessive listings; earlier figures can be found in this page's history or on the Mexico City Metro website. To calculate the average daily ridership, the annual total is divided by 365 days (366 in leap years), with decimals omitted from the result. Each station per line is ranked individually, as the system counts transfer stations separately. The percentage change is calculated automatically using the data from the current year and the previous year.) ▲24.09%
- Rank: 50/195

Services
Preceding station	Mexico City Metro	Following station
Olivos toward Mixcoac	Line 12	Zapotitlán toward Tláhuac
Route map
Location
- Location within Mexico City urban area
- Area map

Nopalera metro station (Note: Estación del Metro Nopalera. Spanish pronunciation: [no.pa'leɾa]. The name of the station literally means "Prickly pear plant" in Spanish.) is a station of the Mexico City Metro in the colonia (neighborhood) of Miguel Hidalgo and the barrio of Santa Ana Zapotitlán, in Tláhuac, Mexico City. It is an elevated station with two side platforms, served by Line 12 (the Golden Line), between Olivos and Zapotitlán metro stations. The name of the station alludes to the numerous pig and poultry farms that used to occupy the area, and to the nopal cactuses that used to grow on their fields. Similarly, the pictogram for the station depicts the outline of a flowering nopal. The station was opened on 30 October 2012, on the first day of service between Tláhuac and Mixcoac metro stations.

The facilities are accessible to people with disabilities as there are elevators, tactile pavings and braille signage plates and there is a bicycle parking station. In 2019, the station had an average daily ridership of 22,491 passengers, making it the 5th busiest station on the line. Since it was opened, Nopalera metro station has had multiple incidents, including a 20-month closure in 2014 due to structural faults found in the elevated section of the line, a closure caused by the 19 September 2017 earthquake that affected the station's track columns, and the subsequent collapse of the track near Olivos station in 2021.

== Location ==
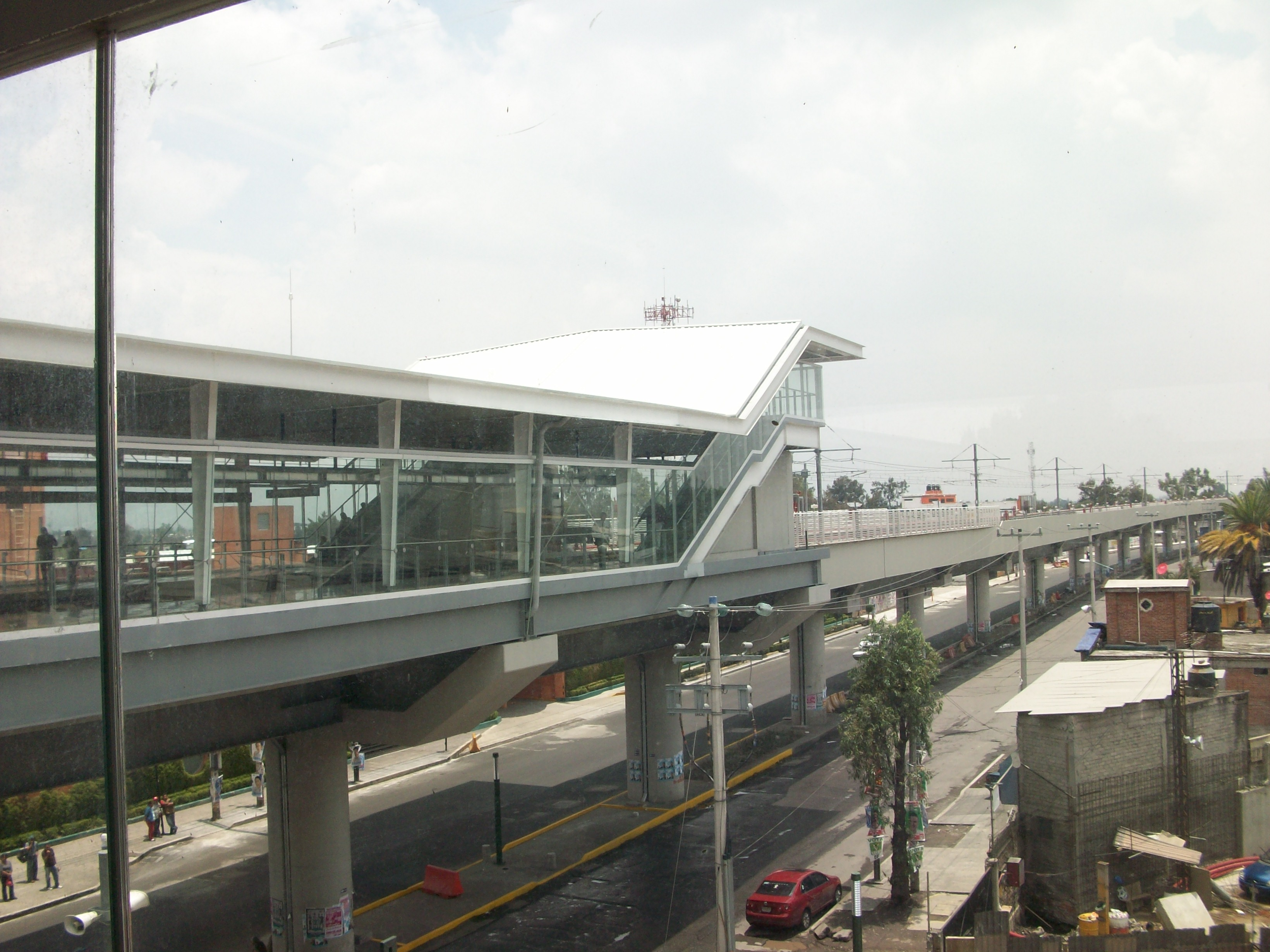
The station in 2012

Nopalera is a metro station along Tláhuac Avenue, located in the colonia (Mexican Spanish for "neighborhood") of Miguel Hidalgo and the barrio of Santa Ana Zapotitlán, in the Tláhuac borough, in southeastern Mexico City. Within the system, the station lies between Olivos and Zapotitlán metro stations. The area is serviced by Route 162 of the Red de Transporte de Pasajeros network.

=== Exits ===
There are two exits:

- North: Tláhuac Avenue and General Manuel M. López Avenue, Santa Ana Zapotitlán.
- South: Tláhuac Avenue and Las Bodas de Fígaro Street, Miguel Hidalgo.

== History and construction ==
Line 12 of the Mexico City Metro was built by Empresas ICA, in association with Alstom Mexicana and Grupo Carso. Nopalera is an elevated station; the Nopalera–Zapotitlán interstation is 1,276 meters (4,186 ft) long, while the Nopalera–Olivos section measures 1,360 meters (4,460 ft). The station was opened on 30 October 2012, on the first day of the Mixcoac–Tláhuac service. The facilities are accessible to people with disabilities as there are elevators, tactile pavings and braille signage plates and there is a bicycle parking station.

The pictogram depicts the close-up of a prickly pear plant with two buds and a flower. According to the Metro system, the species is a Opuntia matudae plant (or xoconostle) and they decided to use a single pad to differentiate it from the Bondojito metro station pictogram, a Line 4 metro station whose signage depicts a complete prickly pear plant.

Originally, the station was projected to be named "Francisco Villa", after the Mexican revolutionary of the same name. Instead, the chosen name and pictogram allude to the pig and poultry farms that existed in the area which were surrounded by prickly pear plants.

=== Incidents ===
Since 2010, the Superior Auditor of the Federation has audited Line 12 several times and has reported several faults, like cracks and detachments along the line, including some at the Nopalera–Zapotitlán–Tlaltenco overpass. From 12 March 2014 to 29 November 2015, Nopalera was closed due to technical and structural faults in the stretch Atlalilco–Tláhuac. After the 19 September 2017 earthquake damaged Line 12 tracks, Nopalera remained closed until 30 October 2017. According to the official report provided by the Metro system, the Olivos–Nopalera overpass was secured as Column 69 had a flexo-compression failure at the lower end. To repair it, weight was released, epoxy resins were injected, additional reinforcement was placed, and the column was enlarged to its maximum stress zone. On 3 May 2021, the station was closed after a portion of Line 12's elevated railway collapsed between Olivos and Tezonco stations.

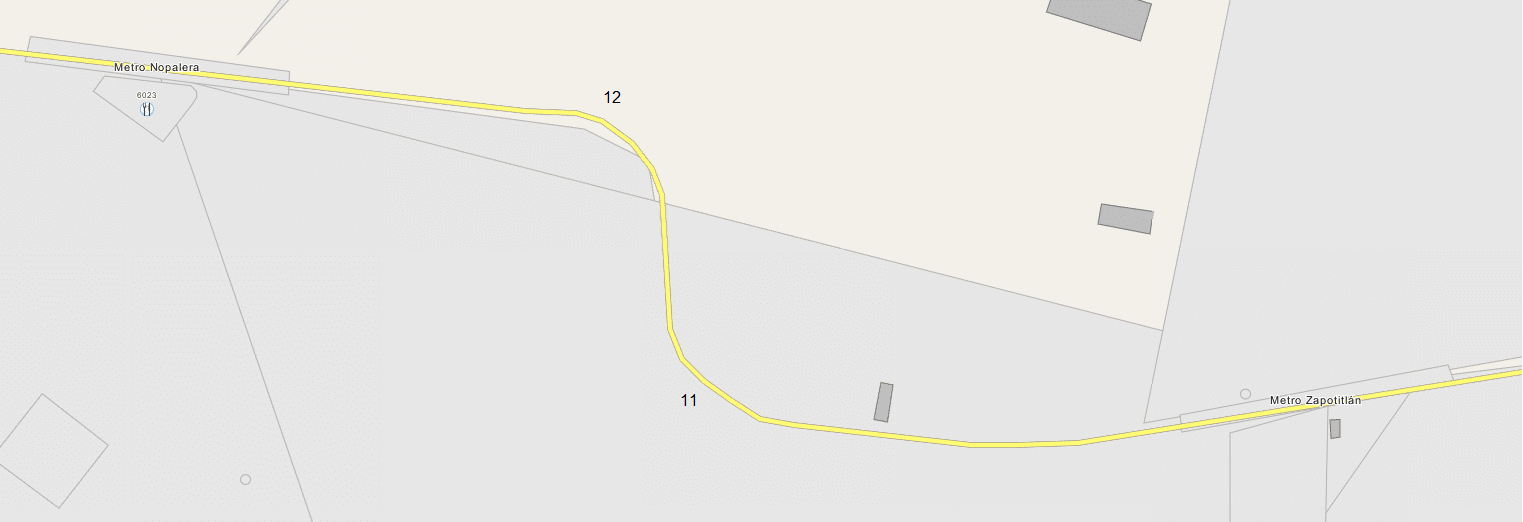
The system identified Curves 11 and 12 along Tláhuac Avenue as a railroad wear zone.

Between Nopalera and Zapotitlán metro stations, there are two sharp curves close to each other; the system marks them as Curves 11 and 12. Curve 11 has a radius of 200 m (660 ft) while Curve 12 has a radius of 201.9 m (662 ft)—both are the tightest of the overpass. According to the Metro union leader, the trains wear out the rails and wheels when there are sharp curves and cause them to clatter. This damage structures such as girders and columns. After the 2017 earthquake, a girder in the section was reinforced with a diagonally-reinforced beam because a seismic top on Column 41 was damaged during the incident. The line uses FE-10 steel-wheeled trains by Construcciones y Auxiliar de Ferrocarriles. They have a length of 140 m (460 ft) and a width of 280 cm (110 in). According to the former director of the system, Joel Ortega, trains do not exit a curve when they are already on the next one, and the maximum speed for taking them was adjusted to 25 km/h (16 mph) for safe train travel but the speed wears and tears on the tracks and wheels. He also said that damage to the tracks had been reported since 2012 and that 900 m (3,000 ft) of track had been replaced within a month of its inauguration.

== Ridership ==
According to the data provided by the authorities, except for the years when Nopalera metro station was closed for several months, commuters averaged between 13,900 and 22,500 daily entrances. In 2019, before the impact of the COVID-19 pandemic on public transport, the station's ridership totaled 8,209,571 passengers, which was an increase of 842,644 passengers compared to 2018. In the same year, Nopalera was the 71st busiest station of the system's 195 stations, and it was the line's fifth busiest.

Annual passenger ridership
Year	Ridership	Average daily	Rank	% change	Ref.
2025	7,737,864	21,199	50/195	+24.09%	
2024	6,235,518	17,036	67/195	NA	
2023	0	0	188/195	NA	
2022	0	0	176/195	−100.00%	
2021	1,619,653	4,437	152/195	−70.12%	
2020	5,420,824	14,810	52/195	−33.97%	
2019	8,209,571	22,491	71/195	+11.44%	
2018	7,366,927	20,183	89/195	+20.80%	
2017	6,098,309	16,707	109/195	+3.56%	
2016	5,888,690	16,089	112/195	+1,295.16%	
