= Culhuacan =

Culhuacan or Culhuacán may refer to:

- Colhuacan (altepetl), a pre-Columbian city-state of the Valley of Mexico
- Pueblo Culhuacán, a neighborhood of the Iztapalapa borough of modern Mexico City
- Culhuacán metro station, a Mexico City Metro station

== See also ==
- Acolhuacan, a pre-Columbian province in the east of the Valley of Mexico
