= FE-10 =

FE-10 may refer to:

- FE-10 (Mexico City Metro), a steel-wheeled variant of the rolling stock used on the Mexico City Metro.
- Nikon FE10, a 35 mm film camera.
