= Ermita metro station =

Mexico City metro station

Ermita
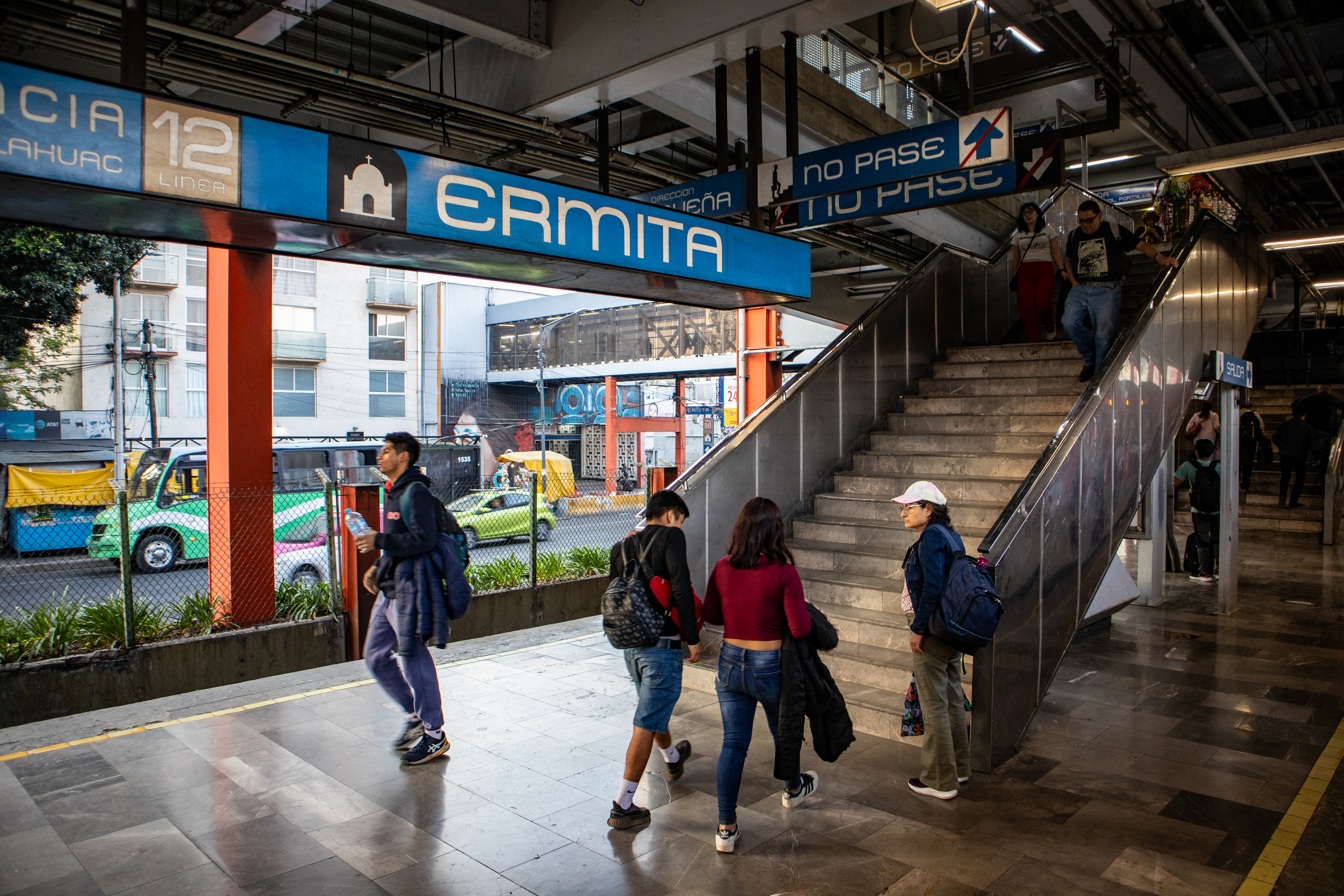
- Line 2 platforms as of February 2025

General information
- Location: Calzada de Tlalpan; Benito Juárez; Mexico City; Mexico
- Coordinates: 19.361883°N 99.142942°W
- System: Mexico City Metro
- Operator: Sistema de Transporte Colectivo (STC)
- Platforms: 1 island platform 2 side platforms
- Tracks: 4

Construction
- Structure type: At grade Underground
- Parking: no
- Cycle facilities: yes
- Accessible: yes

Other information
- Status: In service

History
- Opened: 1 August 1970; 56 years ago 30 October 2012; 13 years ago

Key dates
- 3 May 2021; 5 years ago: Temporarily closed
- 15 January 2023; 3 years ago: Reopened

Passengers
- 2025: Total: 7,838,284; 4,822,828 (Note: The data here is limited to the most recent ten years to avoid excessive listings; earlier figures can be found in this page's history or on the Mexico City Metro website. To calculate the average daily ridership, the annual total is divided by 365 days (366 in leap years), with decimals omitted from the result. Each station per line is ranked individually, as the system counts transfer stations separately. The percentage change is calculated automatically using the data from the current year and the previous year.); 3,015,456 ▲4.03%
- Rank: 107/195; 151/195

Services
Preceding station	Mexico City Metro	Following station
Portales toward Cuatro Caminos	Line 2	General Anaya toward Tasqueña
Eje Central toward Mixcoac	Line 12	Mexicaltzingo toward Tláhuac
Route map
Location
- Location within Mexico City
- Area map

Ermita is a station on Line 2 and Line 12 of the Mexico City Metro system. According to the Sistema de Transporte Colectivo, Ermita serves as a transfer station of Line 12. It is located in the Benito Juárez borough of Mexico City, directly south of the city centre on Calzada de Tlalpan.

== General information ==
It is a surface station. The station logo depicts a chapel: the Spanish word ermita means a small chapel constructed outside a church. The name of this station refers to San Cosme ermita, constructed in 1526. The station was opened on 1 August 1970. The Line 12 station was opened on 30 October 2012 as a part of the first stretch of the line between Mixcoac and Tláhuac.

Ermita provides a transfer with trolleybus Line "D", which also connects with Metro Mixcoac, Metro Zapata, and Metro Portales. Ermita is also not far from trolleybus Line "E".

== Ridership ==
Annual passenger ridership (Line 2)
Year	Ridership	Average daily	Rank	% change	Ref.
2025	4,822,828	13,213	107/195	+2.99%
2024	4,682,835	12,794	105/195	−7.86%
2023	5,082,384	13,924	90/195	−4.02%
2022	5,295,033	14,506	82/195	+57.42%
2021	3,363,619	9,215	94/195	+5.11%
2020	3,200,082	8,743	111/195	−46.33%
2019	5,962,152	16,334	110/195	−2.78%
2018	6,132,567	16,801	109/195	+4.76%
2017	5,853,753	16,307	111/195	−2.21%
2016	5,985,827	16,354	110/195	−1.01%

Annual passenger ridership (Line 12)
Year	Ridership	Average daily	Rank	% change	Ref.
2025	3,015,456	8,261	151/195	+5.75%
2024	2,851,579	7,791	147/195	+44.29%
2023	1,976,215	5,414	156/195	NA
2022	0	0	176/195	−100.00%
2021	847,698	2,322	184/195	−60.05%
2020	2,121,777	5,797	149/195	−45.66%
2019	3,904,630	14,213	151/195	+4.64%
2018	3,731,662	14,097	152/195	−5.10%
2017	3,932,297	10,773	145/195	+7.85%
2016	3,646,076	9,961	148/195	+40.48%

== Gallery ==
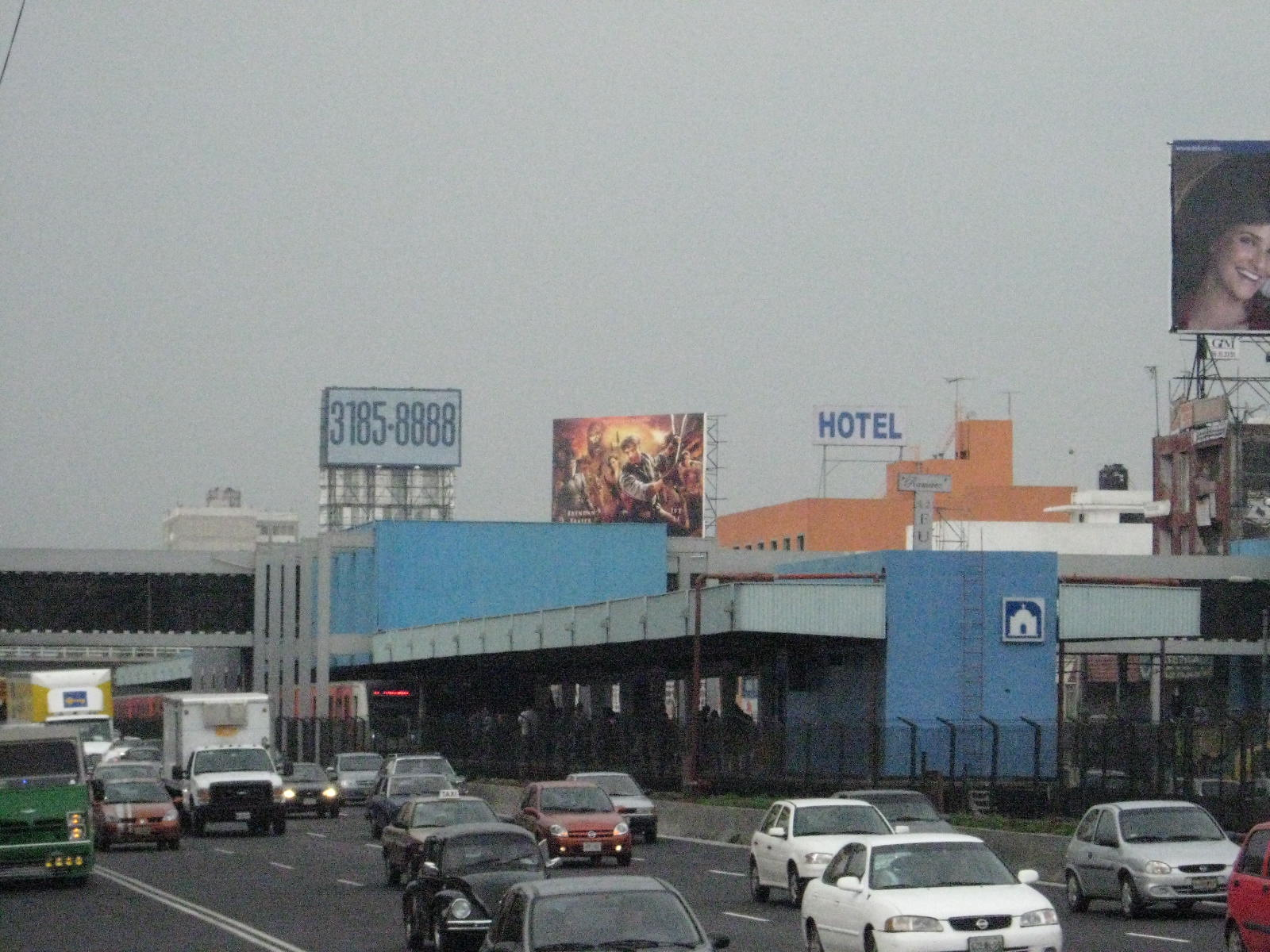
Metro Station Ermita, 26 August 2008.

== See also ==
- List of Mexico City metro stations
