= Tezonco metro station =

Mexico City metro station

Tezonco
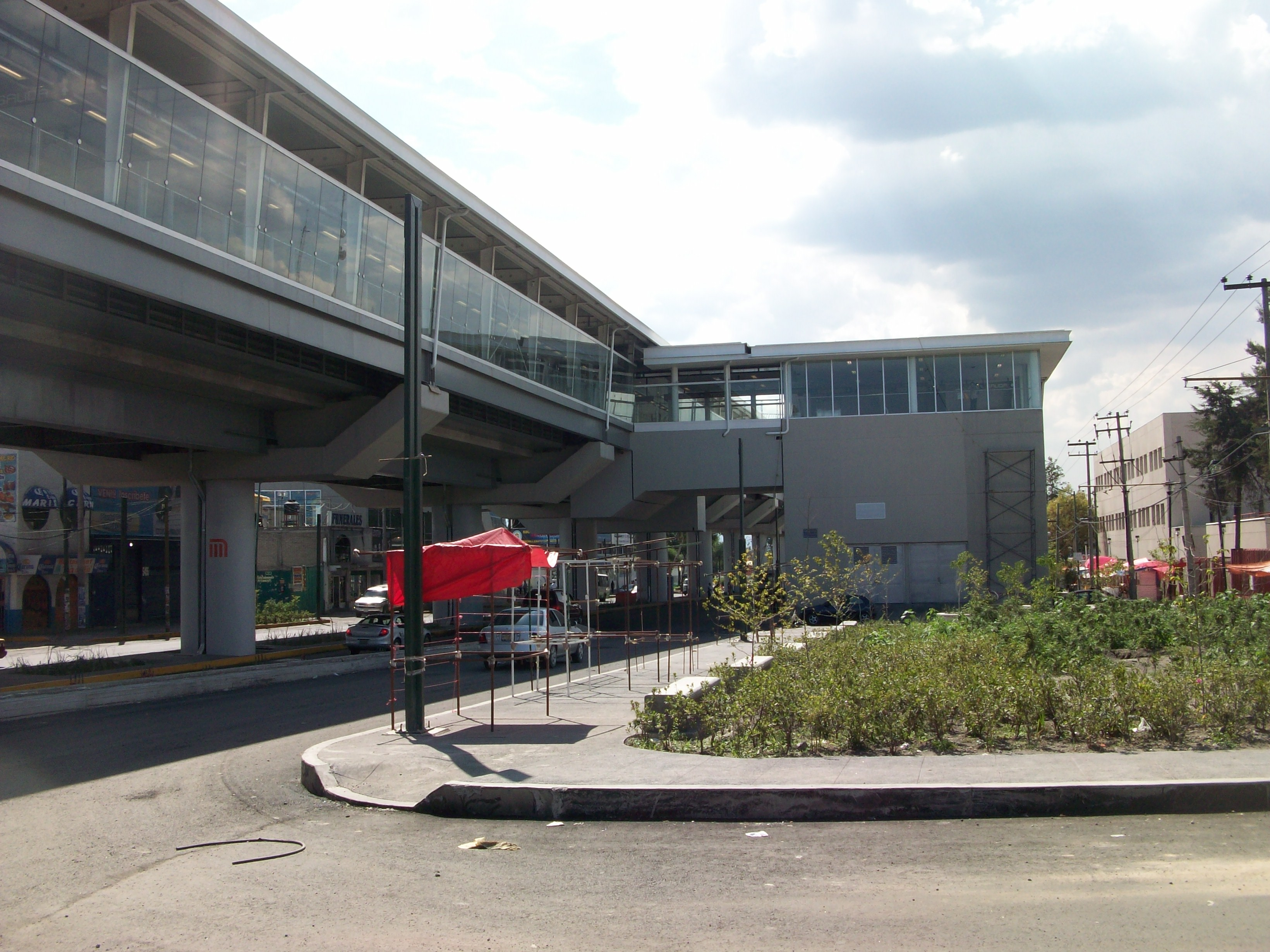
- The station building, 2012

General information
- Location: Tláhuac Avenue; Iztapalapa, Mexico City; Mexico
- Coordinates: 19.306365°N 99.065533°W
- System: Mexico City Metro
- Owner: Government of Mexico City
- Operator: Sistema de Transporte Colectivo (STC)
- Platforms: 2 side platforms
- Tracks: 2
- Connections: Route: 162

Construction
- Structure type: Elevated
- Cycle facilities: Bicycle parking-only
- Accessible: Yes

Other information
- Status: In service

History
- Opened: 30 October 2012; 14 years ago
- Former names: San Lorenzo Tezonco (planned); San Lorenzo (planned)

Key dates
- 12 March 2014; 12 years ago: Temporarily closed
- 29 November 2015; 10 years ago: Reopened
- 3 May 2021; 5 years ago: Temporarily closed
- 30 January 2024; 2 years ago: Reopened

Passengers
- 2025: 7,404,210 (Note: The data here is limited to the most recent ten years to avoid excessive listings; earlier figures can be found in this page's history or on the Mexico City Metro website. To calculate the average daily ridership, the annual total is divided by 365 days (366 in leap years), with decimals omitted from the result. Each station per line is ranked individually, as the system counts transfer stations separately. The percentage change is calculated automatically using the data from the current year and the previous year.) ▲22.04%
- Rank: 55/195

Services
Preceding station	Mexico City Metro	Following station
Periférico Oriente toward Mixcoac	Line 12	Olivos toward Tláhuac
Route map
Location
- Location within Mexico City urban area
- Area map and layout

Tezonco metro station (Note: Estación del Metro Tezonco. Mexican Spanish pronunciation: [teˈsoŋko]. The etymology comes from the Nahuatl language, "where the tezontle is".) is a station of the Mexico City Metro in the town of San Lorenzo Tezonco and in the colonia of Granjas San Jerónimo, in Iztapalapa, Mexico City. It is an elevated station with two side platforms, served by Line 12 (the Golden Line), between Periférico Oriente and Olivos stations. The station's pictogram features a calavera as it references the area's Day of the Dead traditions during the festivity. The station was opened on 30 October 2012, on the first day of service from Tláhuac to Mixcoac metro stations.

The facilities are accessible for people with disabilities as there are elevators, tactile pavings and braille signage plates and there is a bicycle parking station. In 2019, the station had an average daily ridership of 23,131 passengers, making it the fourth-busiest station on the line. The station was closed for 20 months due to structural faults found in the line in 2014. In May 2021, a portion of the station's overhead track collapsed while a train was on it. The track fell onto cars and pedestrians below it, killing 26 and injuring 98.

== Location and station layout ==
Tezonco is a metro station along Tláhuac Avenue, located in the town of San Lorenzo Tezonco and in the colonia (Mexican Spanish for "neighborhood") of Granjas San Jerónimo, in the Tláhuac borough, in southeastern Mexico City. Within the system, the station lies between Periférico Oriente and Olivos metro stations. The facilities are accessible for people with disabilities as there are elevators, tactile pavings and braille signage plates and there is a bicycle parking station.

There are two exits: the northern one on the corner of Tláhuac and Zacatlán Avenues, in the town of San Lorenzo Tezonco, and the second on the opposite side of Tláhuac Avenue, between Ignacio Ma. Barrera and Ambrosio del Pino Streets, in the colonia of Granjas San Jerónimo. Tezonco metro station has three levels: the station's platforms, the mezzanine and an access lobby. The area is serviced by Route 162 of the Red de Transporte de Pasajeros network.

== History and construction ==
Line 12 of the Mexico City Metro was built by Empresas ICA, in association with Alstom Mexicana and Grupo Carso. Tezonco is an elevated station; the Tezonco–Periférico Oriente interstation is 1,545 meters (5,069 ft) long, while the Tezonco–Olivos section measures 490 meters (1,610 ft). The station was opened on 30 October 2012, on the first day of the Mixcoac–Tláhuac service. The pictogram depicts a calavera, as San Lorenzo Tezonco is known for its Day of the Dead celebrations. Originally, the station was projected to be named "San Lorenzo Tezonco" and "San Lorenzo".

=== Incidents ===
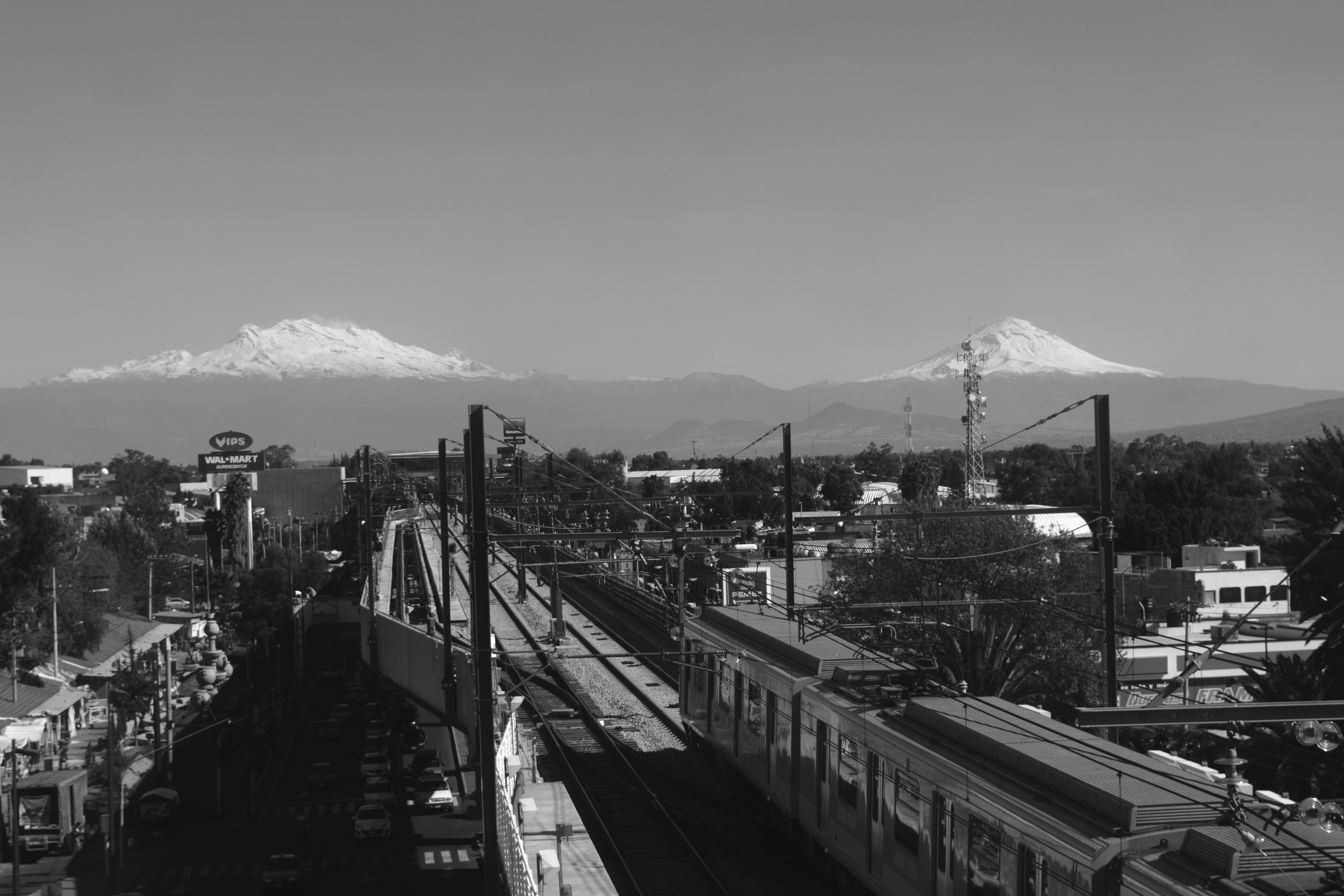
A passing train over the Tezonco (not pictured) and Olivos stations section.

From 12 March 2014 to 29 November 2015, Tezonco was closed due to technical and structural faults on the segment between Atlalilco and Tláhuac.

After the 19 September 2017 earthquake damaged Line 12 tracks, Tezonco was temporarily closed for assessments; the station reopened three days later. According to the official report provided by the Metro system, steel diaphragms were placed in the area to provide further support, as the beams and headers were affected.

On 3 May 2021, a section of the elevated line between Tezonco and Olivos metro stations collapsed as a train traversed it. In total, 26 people died and 98 others were injured. After the 2017 earthquake, the Superior Auditor of the Federation (Auditoría Superior de la Federación) made observations of damage to the affected section that were not resolved. On 26 May 2021, the Mexico City Metrobús started a free, temporary route from Tláhuac to Atlalilco station, with a halfway stop at Tezonco station. On 26 August 2022, the line repair team began the dismantling of a girder located 200 m (660 ft) away from the collapse site (in the same interstation section) after finding that its girder could collapse even with the reinforcements that will be installed on the elevated section.

== Ridership ==
According to the data provided by the authorities, except for the years when Tezonco metro station was closed for several months, commuters have averaged per year between 14,700 and 23,200 daily entrances. In 2019, before the impact of the COVID-19 pandemic on public transport, the station's ridership totaled 8,443,023 passengers, which was an increase of 559,995 passengers compared to 2018. In the same year, Tezonco was the 62nd busiest of the system's 195 stations, and it was the line's 4th busiest.

Annual passenger ridership
Year	Ridership	Average daily	Rank	% change	Ref.
2025	7,404,210	20,285	55/195	+22.04%	
2024	6,067,056	16,576	72/195	NA	
2023	0	0	188/195	NA	
2022	0	0	176/195	−100.00%	
2021	1,623,999	4,449	150/195	−69.93%	
2020	5,401,525	14,758	54/195	−36.02%	
2019	8,443,023	23,131	62/195	+7.10%	
2018	7,883,028	21,597	80/195	+7.68%	
2017	7,320,523	20,056	87/195	+16.28%	
2016	6,295,461	17,200	106/195	+1,355.91%	
