= Mexicaltzingo metro station =

Mexico City metro station

Mexicaltzingo
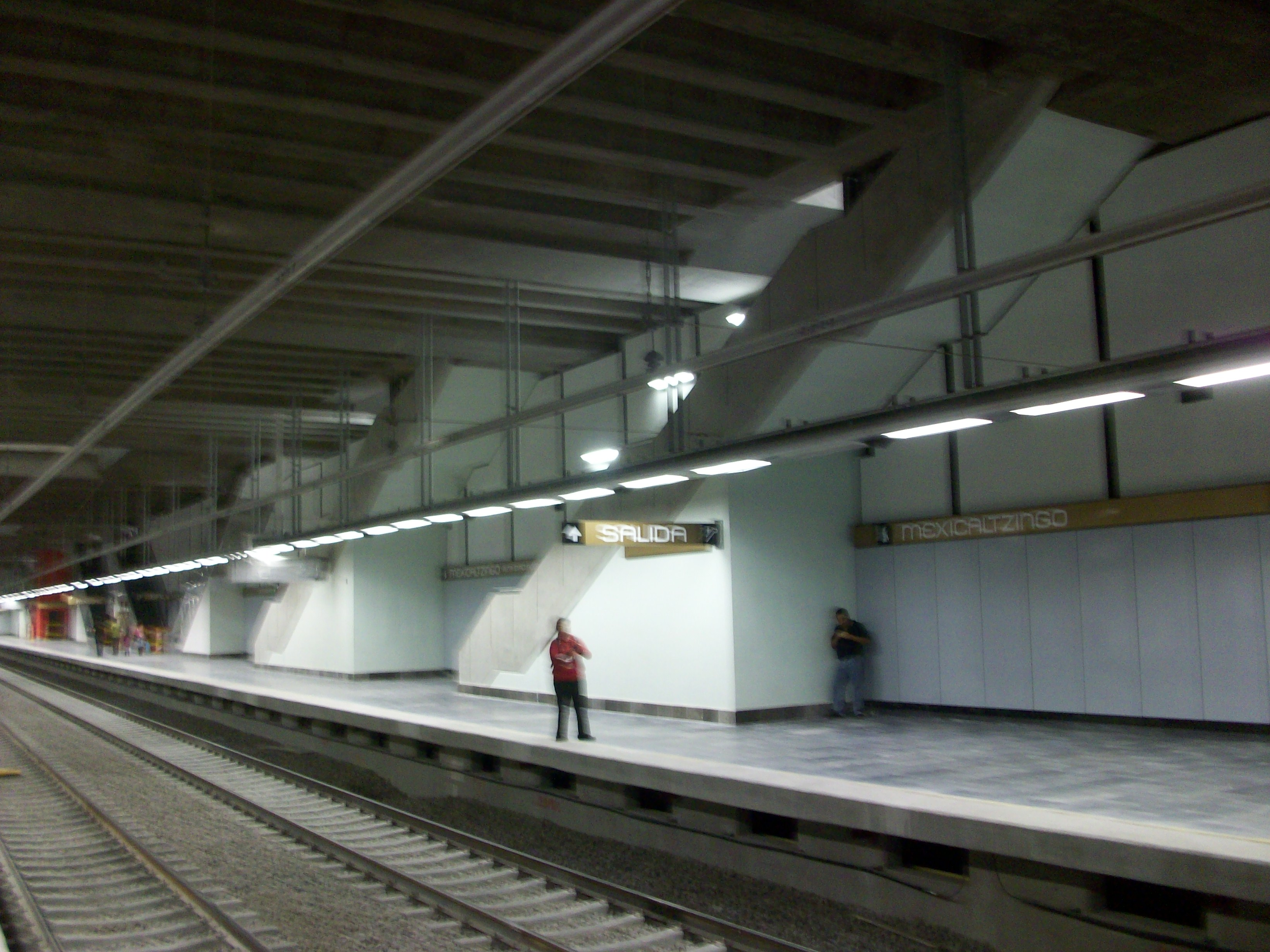

General information
- Coordinates: 19.357671°N 99.121852°W
- System: Mexico City Metro
- Operator: Sistema de Transporte Colectivo (STC)
- Platforms: 2 side platforms
- Tracks: 2

Construction
- Structure type: Underground
- Accessible: yes

Other information
- Status: In service

History
- Opened: 30 October 2012; 13 years ago

Key dates
- 3 May 2021; 5 years ago: Temporarily closed
- 15 January 2023; 3 years ago: Reopened

Passengers
- 2025: 5,453,367 (Note: The data here is limited to the most recent ten years to avoid excessive listings; earlier figures can be found in this page's history or on the Mexico City Metro website. To calculate the average daily ridership, the annual total is divided by 365 days (366 in leap years), with decimals omitted from the result. Each station per line is ranked individually, as the system counts transfer stations separately. The percentage change is calculated automatically using the data from the current year and the previous year.) ▲6.52%
- Rank: 91/195

Services
Preceding station	Mexico City Metro	Following station
Ermita toward Mixcoac	Line 12	Atlalilco toward Tláhuac
Route map
Location
- Location within Mexico City
- Area map

Mexicaltzingo is a station on Line 12 of the Mexico City Metro. The station is located between Ermita and Atlalilco. It was opened on 30 October 2012 as a part of the first stretch of Line 12 between Mixcoac and Tláhuac.

The station is located south of the city center, at the intersection between Eje 2 Ote Calzada de la Viga and Eje 8 Sur Calzada Ermita-Iztapalapa. It is built underground.

The name of the station is taken from that of the colonia it is located in. The station's icon depicts the god Mexictli sitting on top of an inverted maguey plant, in reference to Mexicaltzingo's symbol in the Codex of Coatlinchan.

== Ridership ==
Annual passenger ridership
Year	Ridership	Average daily	Rank	% change	Ref.
2025	5,453,367	14,940	91/195	+6.52%
2024	5,119,525	13,987	91/195	+33.99%
2023	3,820,925	10,468	117/195	NA
2022	0	0	176/195	−100.00%
2021	1,030,856	2,824	173/195	−73.17%
2020	3,842,764	10,499	94/195	−44.96%
2019	6,981,386	19,127	93/195	+4.40%
2018	6,687,360	18,321	97/195	+8.50%
2017	6,163,465	16,886	107/195	+6.32%
2016	5,797,272	15,839	113/195	+30.03%
