= Olivos metro station =

Mexico City Metro station

Olivos
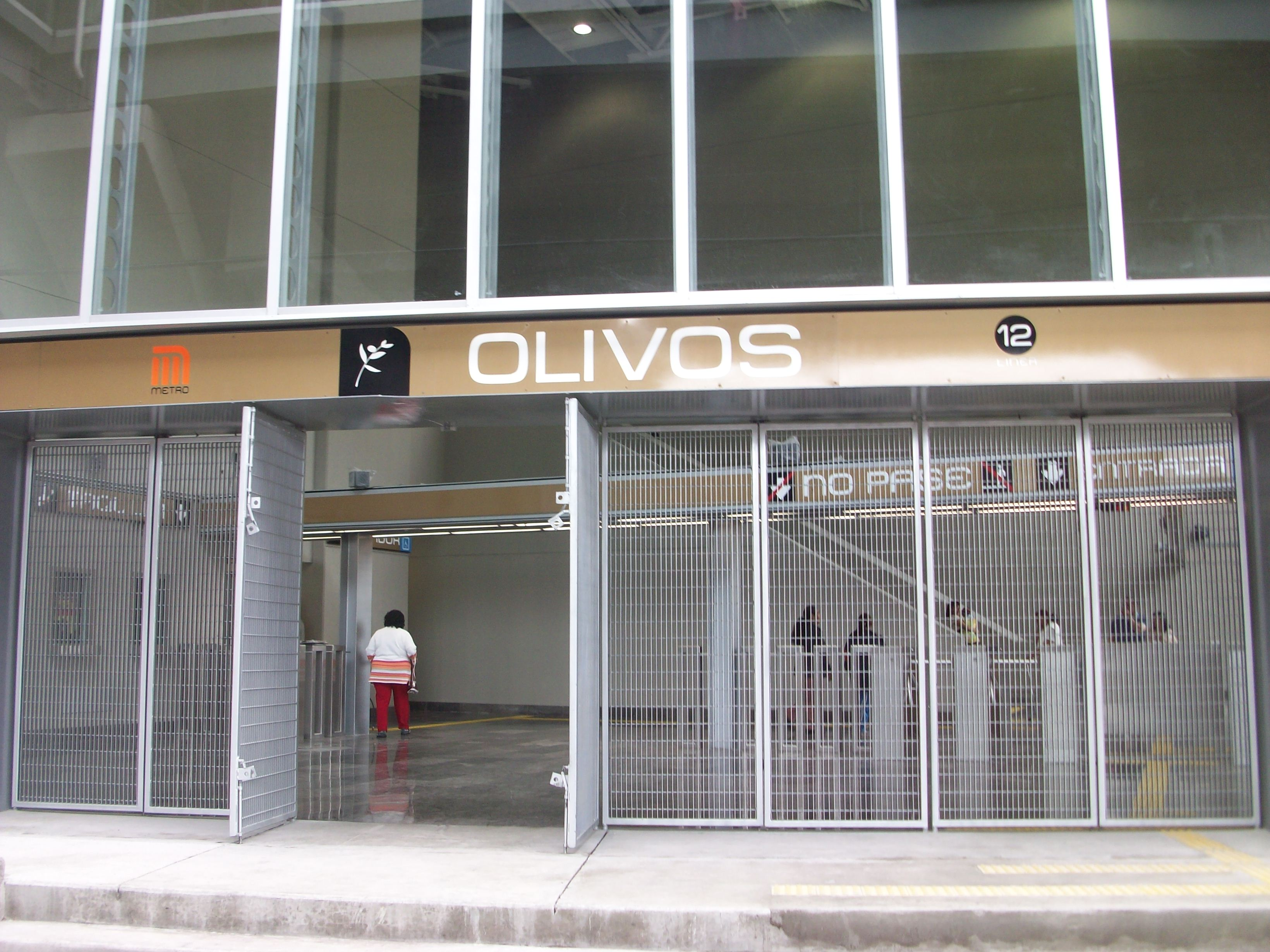
- Entrance to the station, 2012

General information
- Location: Tláhuac Avenue; Tláhuac, Mexico City; Mexico
- Coordinates: 19.304275°N 99.059385°W
- System: Mexico City Metro
- Owner: Government of Mexico City
- Operator: Sistema de Transporte Colectivo (STC)
- Platforms: 2 side platforms
- Tracks: 2
- Connections: Route: 162

Construction
- Structure type: Elevated
- Cycle facilities: Bicycle parking-only
- Accessible: Yes

Other information
- Status: In service

History
- Opened: 30 October 2012; 14 years ago
- Former names: Los Olivos (planned)

Key dates
- 12 March 2014; 12 years ago: Temporarily closed
- 29 November 2015; 10 years ago: Reopened
- 3 May 2021; 5 years ago: Temporarily closed
- 30 January 2024; 2 years ago: Reopened

Passengers
- 2025: 5,262,538 (Note: The data here is limited to the most recent ten years to avoid excessive listings; earlier figures can be found in this page's history or on the Mexico City Metro website. To calculate the average daily ridership, the annual total is divided by 365 days (366 in leap years), with decimals omitted from the result. Each station per line is ranked individually, as the system counts transfer stations separately. The percentage change is calculated automatically using the data from the current year and the previous year.) ▲23.09%
- Rank: 99/195

Services
Preceding station	Mexico City Metro	Following station
Tezonco toward Mixcoac	Line 12	Nopalera toward Tláhuac
Route map
Location
- Location within Mexico City urban area
- Area map and layout

Olivos metro station (Note: Estación del Metro Olivos. Spanish pronunciation: [oˈli.βos]. The name of the station literally means "Olives" in Spanish.) is a station of the Mexico City Metro in the colonias (neighborhoods) of Ampliación Los Olivos and Granjas San Jerónimo, in Tláhuac, Mexico City. It is an elevated station with two side platforms, served by Line 12 (the Golden Line), between Tezonco and Nopalera stations. The station's pictogram features an olive branch, as it references the area's reputation for olive oil production during the Colonial period. The station was opened on 30 October 2012, on the first day of service between Tláhuac and Mixcoac metro stations.

The facilities are accessible for people with disabilities as there are elevators, tactile pavings and braille signage plates and there is a bicycle parking station. In 2019, the station had an average daily ridership of 17,846 passengers, making it the seventh busiest station on the line. The station was closed for 20 months due to structural faults found in the line in 2014. In May 2021, a portion of the station's overhead track collapsed while a train was on it. The track fell onto cars and pedestrians below it, killing 26 and injuring 98.

== Location ==
Olivos is a metro station along Tláhuac Avenue, located in the colonias (Mexican Spanish for "neighborhood") of Ampliación Los Olivos and Granjas San Jerónimo, in the Tláhuac borough, in southeastern Mexico City. Within the system, the station lies between Tezonco and Nopalera metro stations. The area is serviced by Route 162 of the Red de Transporte de Pasajeros network.

=== Exits ===
There are two exits:

- North: Tláhuac Avenue (between Pino Driveway and Del Panal Street), Ampliación Los Olivos.
- South: Tláhuac Avenue and Olivos Street, Granjas San Jerónimo.

== History and construction ==
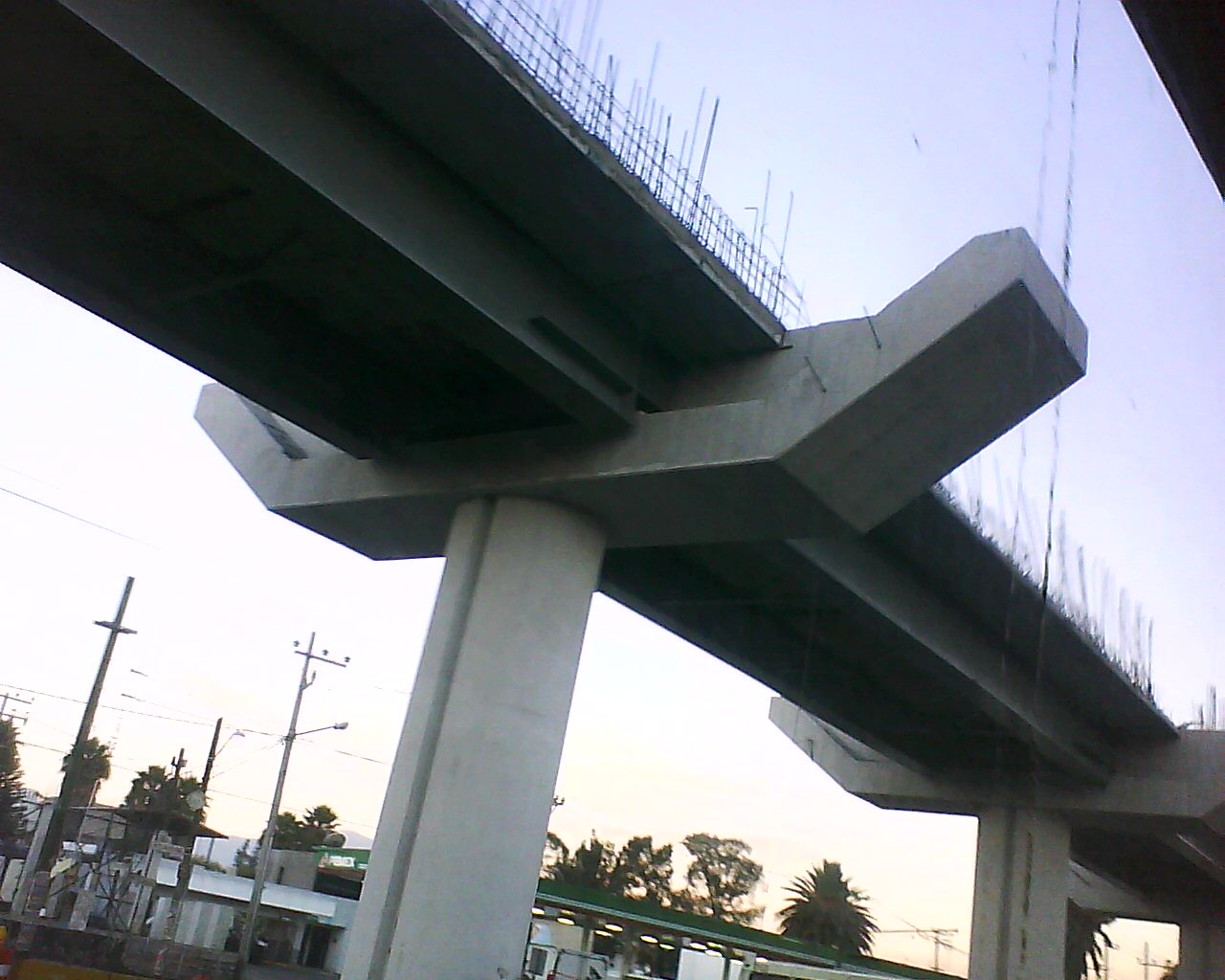
Steel girders near Olivos station in 2010

Line 12 of the Mexico City Metro was built by Empresas ICA, in association with Alstom Mexicana and Grupo Carso. Olivos is an elevated station; the Olivos–Tezonco interstation is 490 meters (1,610 ft) long, while the Olivos–Nopalera section measures 1,360 meters (4,460 ft). The station was opened on 30 October 2012, on the first day of the Mixcoac–Tláhuac service. The facilities are accessible for people with disabilities as there are elevators, tactile pavings and braille signage plates and there is a bicycle parking station. The pictogram depicts an olive branch, as the area was known for olive oil production during the Colonial period. Originally, the station was projected to be named "Los Olivos".

=== Incidents ===
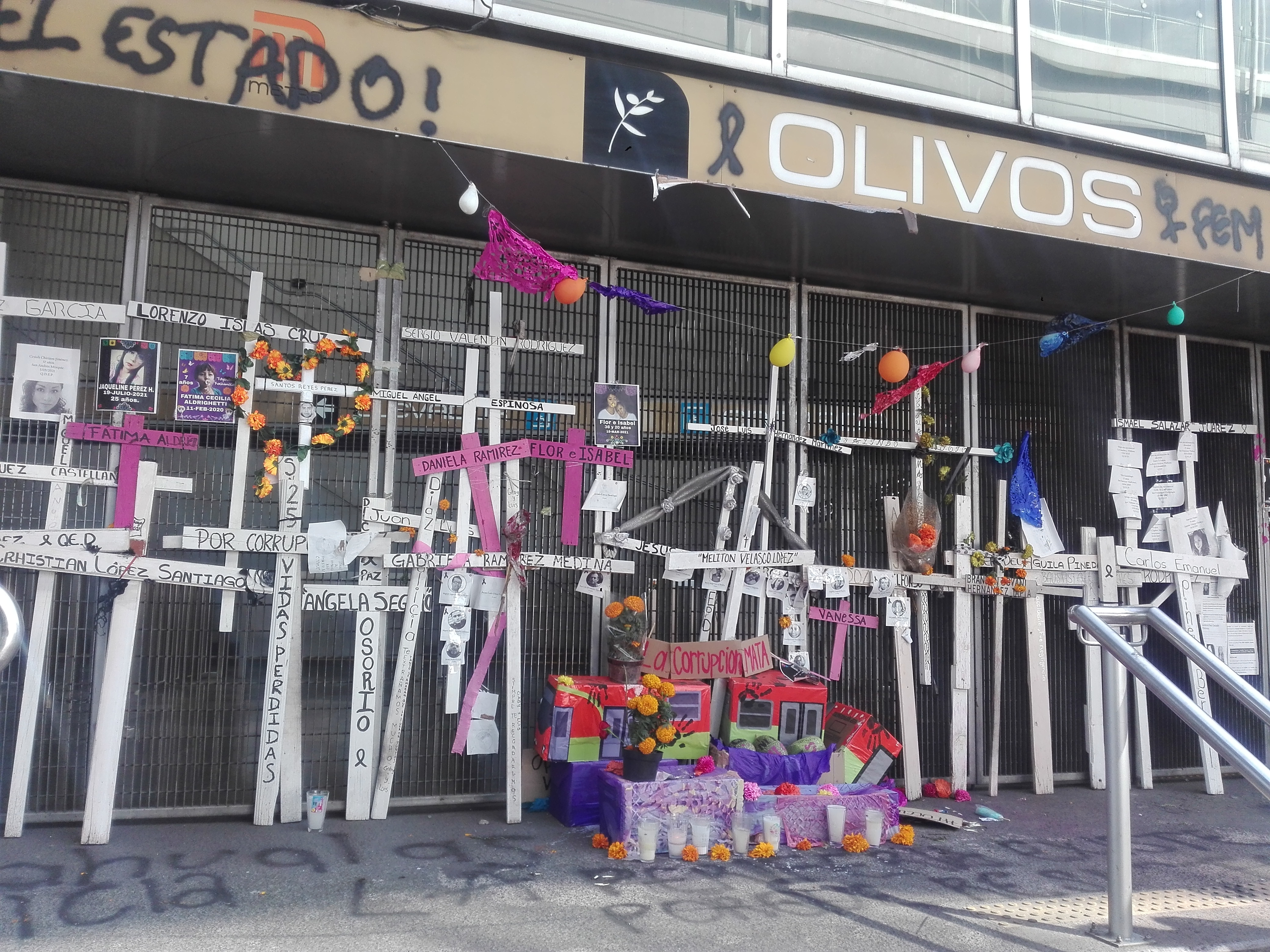
Olivos station in November 2021. The entrance is covered with altars in memory of those who died on 3 May 2021.

From 12 March 2014 to 29 November 2015, Olivos station was closed due to technical and structural faults in the stretch between Atlalilco and Tláhuac.

After the 19 September 2017 earthquake damaged Line 12 tracks, Olivos metro station was temporarily closed, but three days, later it was reopened and served as the provisional terminal station for one month. According to the official report provided by the Metro system, steel diaphragms were placed in the Tezonco–Olivos section, to provide further support as the beams and headers were affected by the earthquake. The Olivos–Nopalera overpass was secured as Column 69 had a flexo-compression failure at the lower end. To repair it, weight was released, epoxy resins were injected, additional reinforcement was placed, and the column was enlarged to its maximum stress zone.

On 3 May 2021, a section of the elevated line between Olivos and Tezonco metro stations collapsed as a train traversed it. 26 people died and 98 others were injured. After the 2017 earthquake, the Superior Auditor of the Federation (Auditoría Superior de la Federación) made observations of damage to the collapsed section that were not resolved.

On 26 August 2022, the line repair team began the dismantling of a girder located 200 m (660 ft) away from the collapse site (in the same interstation section) after finding that its girder could collapse even with the reinforcements that will be installed on the elevated section.

== Ridership ==
According to the data provided by the authorities, except for the years when Olivos metro station was closed for several months, commuters have averaged per year between 10,000 and 18,500 daily entrances. In 2019, before the impact of the COVID-19 pandemic on public transport, the station's ridership totaled 6,513,862 passengers, which represented an increase of 537,987 passengers compared to 2018. In the same year, Olivos was the 102nd busiest of the system's 195 stations, and it was the line's 7th busiest.

Annual passenger ridership
Year	Ridership	Average daily	Rank	% change	Ref.
2025	5,262,538	14,417	99/195	+23.09%	
2024	4,275,325	11,681	117/195	NA	
2023	0	0	188/195	NA	
2022	0	0	176/195	−100.00%	
2021	1,105,981	3,030	170/195	−72.04%	
2020	3,955,540	10,807	91/195	−39.28%	
2019	6,513,862	17,846	102/195	+9.00%	
2018	5,975,875	16,372	110/195	−11.48%	
2017	6,750,633	18,494	91/195	+40.95%	
2016	4,789,236	13,085	128/195	+1,183.70%	
