= Culhuacán metro station =

Mexico City metro station

Culhuacán
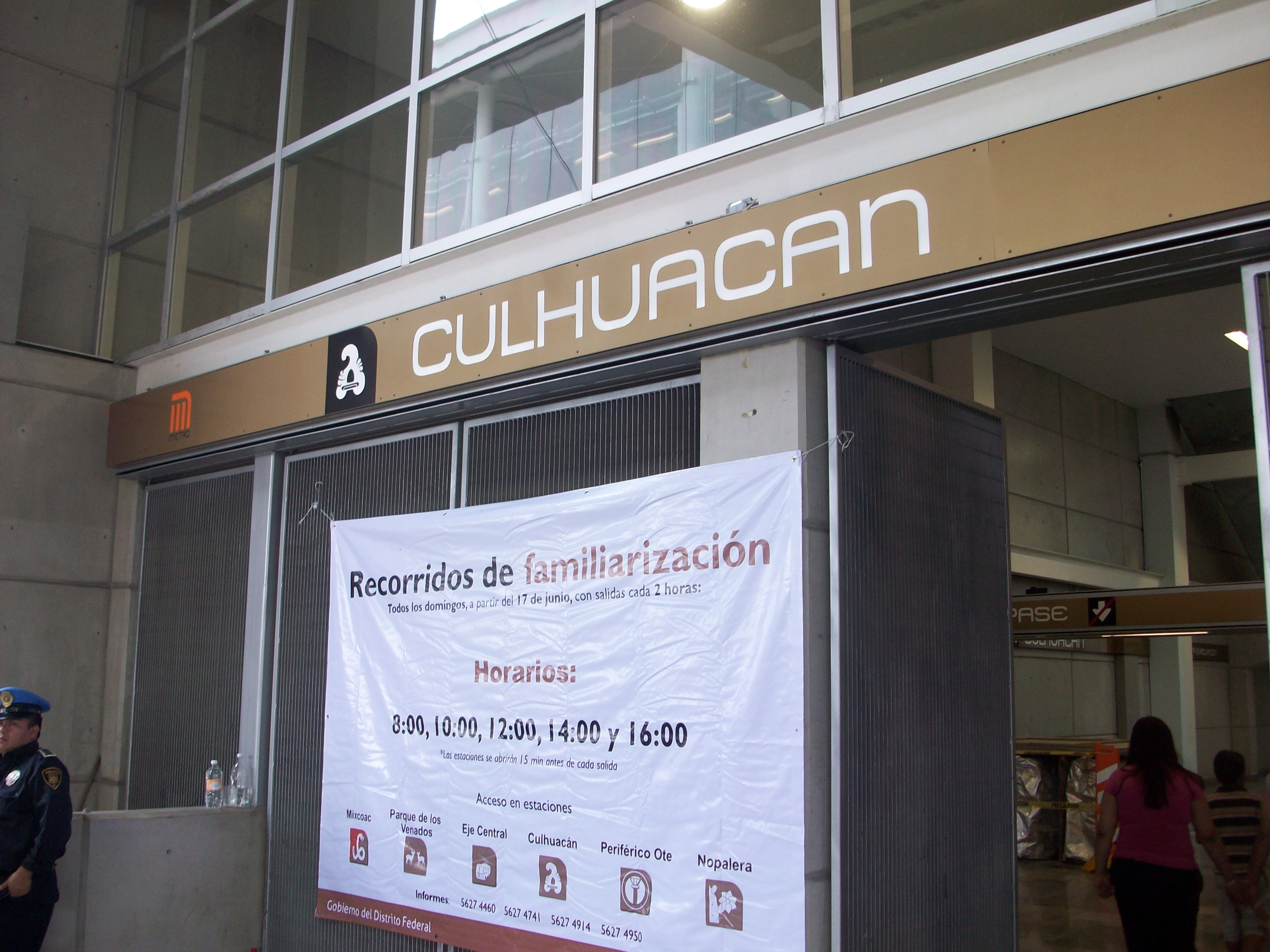
- The station

General information
- Coordinates: 19.337001°N 99.108990°W
- System: Mexico City Metro
- Operator: Sistema de Transporte Colectivo (STC)
- Platforms: 2 side platforms
- Tracks: 2

Construction
- Structure type: Elevated
- Accessible: yes

Other information
- Status: In service

History
- Opened: 30 October 2012; 13 years ago

Key dates
- 12 March 2014; 12 years ago: Temporarily closed
- 28 October 2015; 10 years ago: Reopened
- 3 May 2021; 5 years ago: Temporarily closed
- 15 July 2023; 3 years ago: Reopened

Passengers
- 2025: 5,378,305 (Note: The data here is limited to the most recent ten years to avoid excessive listings; earlier figures can be found in this page's history or on the Mexico City Metro website. To calculate the average daily ridership, the annual total is divided by 365 days (366 in leap years), with decimals omitted from the result. Each station per line is ranked individually, as the system counts transfer stations separately. The percentage change is calculated automatically using the data from the current year and the previous year.) ▲11.07%
- Rank: 96/195

Services
Preceding station	Mexico City Metro	Following station
Atlalilco toward Mixcoac	Line 12	San Andrés Tomatlán toward Tláhuac
Route map
Location
- Location within Mexico City
- Area map

Culhuacán is a station on Line 12 of the Mexico City Metro. The station is located between Atlalilco and San Andrés Tomatlán. It was opened on 30 October 2012 as a part of the first stretch of Line 12 between Mixcoac and Tláhuac.

The station is located south of the city center, at the intersection between Avenida Tlahuac and Calzada Taxqueña. It is above the ground.

The station is named after the pueblo of Culhuacán, which was an important prehispanic city and is now a designated "Barrio Mágico" within the borough of Iztapalapa. The station's icon depicts the Aztec glyph for Culhuacán.

== Ridership ==
Annual passenger ridership
Year	Ridership	Average daily	Rank	% change	Ref.
2025	5,378,305	14,735	96/195	+11.07%
2024	4,842,322	13,230	101/195	+226.18%
2023	1,484,572	4,067	169/195	NA
2022	0	0	176/195	−100.00%
2021	1,179,625	3,231	166/195	−68.40%
2020	3,733,417	10,200	100/195	−33.14%
2019	5,583,585	15,297	118/195	+5.80%
2018	5,277,511	14,458	124/195	+11.09%
2017	4,750,865	13,016	128/195	+10.22%
2016	4,310,520	11,777	139/195	+630.65%
