= Mexico City Metro Line 12 =

Metro line in Mexico City

Line 12

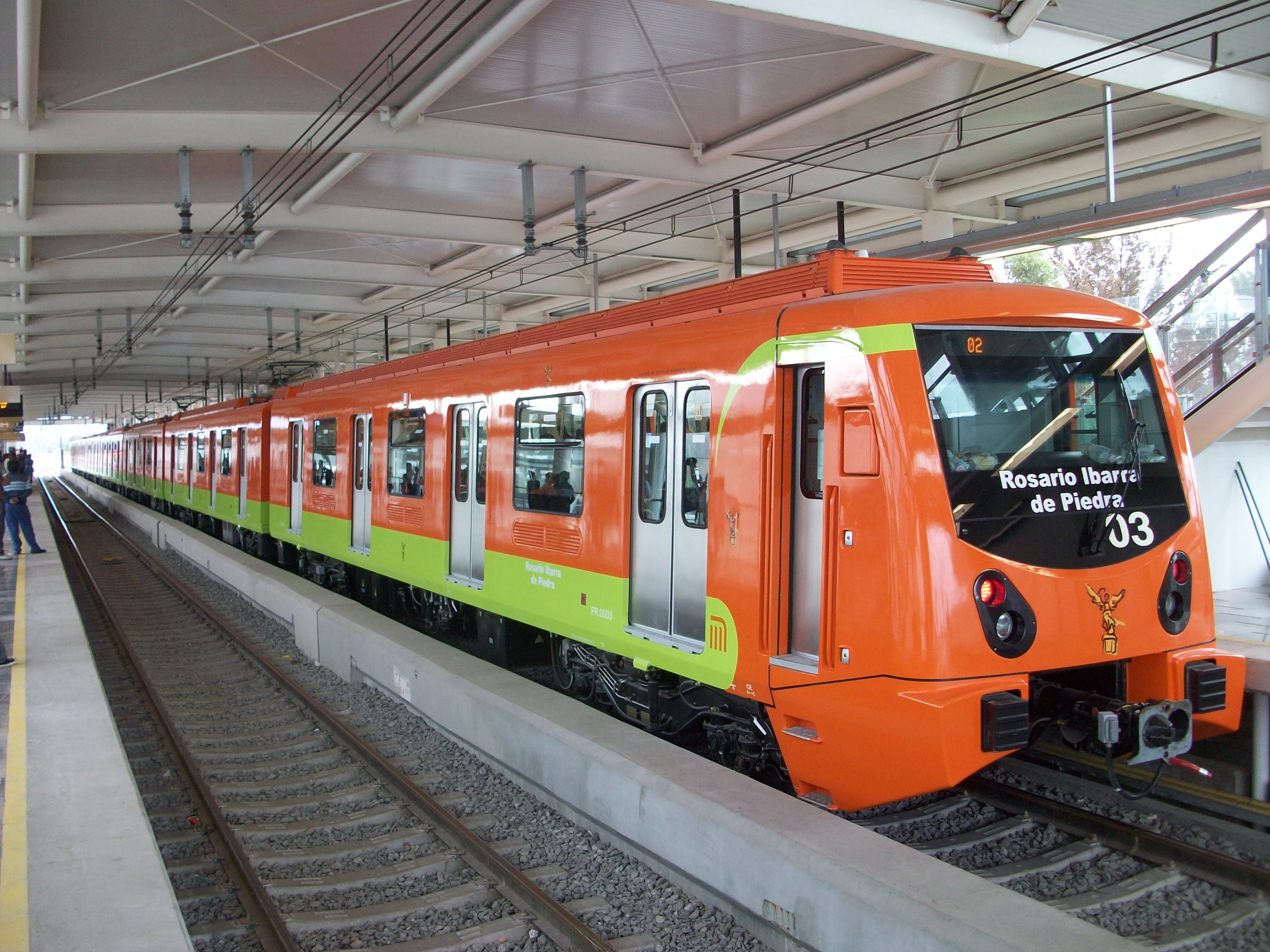
- FE-10 train operating on Line 12

Overview
- Other name: Golden Line
- Locale: Mexico City
- Termini: Tláhuac; Mixcoac
- Connecting lines: at Atlalilco; at Ermita; at Zapata; at Mixcoac
- Stations: 20
- Website: metro.cdmx.gob.mx

Service
- Type: Rapid transit
- System: Mexico City Metro
- Operator(s): Sistema de Transporte Colectivo (STC)
- Rolling stock: FE-10
- Ridership: 105,030,602 (2024)

History
- Opened: 30 October 2012; 13 years ago
- Temporarily closed (Culhuacán–Tláhuac): 12 March 2014 to 28 October 2015
- Temporarily closed: 3 May 2021 to 30 Jan 2024

Technical
- Line length: 24.11 km (14.98 mi)
- Track length: 25.1 km (15.6 mi)
- Number of tracks: 2
- Character: Elevated, at-grade and underground
- Track gauge: 1,435 mm (4 ft 8 1/2 in) standard gauge
- Electrification: Overhead line, 1,500 V DC
- Operating speed: 36 km/h (22 mph)
Route map
Line 12 route highlighted in gray

Mexico City Metro Line 12, also known as the Golden Line (Spanish: línea dorada) from its color on the system map, is a rapid transit line of the Mexico City Metro network. It travels 25.1 kilometers (15.6 mi) along the boroughs of Benito Juárez, Iztapalapa and Tláhuac in southwestern, central-southern and southeastern Mexico City, serving twenty stations. The line was inaugurated on 30 October 2012, going from Tláhuac to Mixcoac station. In 2016, work to expand it to Observatorio station started. All the stations are accessible to people with disabilities as they have elevators, tactile pavings and braille signage plates.

Line 12 was built by Mexican construction company Empresas ICA in association with Alstom Mexicana and Grupo Carso. It runs at grade, overground and underground levels. The interchange stations are Mixcoac (Line 7), Zapata (Line 3), Ermita (Line 2) and Atlalilco (Line 8), and when completed, Observatorio (Line 1). The line connects with other transport systems in the city, including the trolleybus and the Metrobús systems. In 2019, Line 12 had a total ridership of 134,900,367 passengers, averaging 369,590 passengers per day.

Since its planning, the line underwent several modifications in its layout and characteristics. It was originally planned as a mostly subway line that would operate with rubber-tired trains. Also, the line would not operate primarily along Tláhuac Avenue. However, due to time and budget constraints the project underwent modifications after its announcement, and it became a combined under- and overground line with steel-tired trains running elevated along Tláhuac Avenue. Subsidence was reported on several columns along the elevated section before testings with trains started. From the onset of service, problems on the line were still reported especially on the elevated part of the line. In early 2014, operations were halted on that section and they were resumed until late 2015. The elevated track later suffered the impact of a M_{w} 7.1 earthquake in September 2017. In May 2021, a portion of the line's overpass collapsed while a train was on it, resulting in 26 deaths and the line's operations suspended. Investigations concluded that the bridge had a deficient and questionable construction. On January 15, 2023, the section from Mixcoac to Atlalilco reopened for service. On July 15, 2023, the section from Atlalilco to Periférico Oriente also reopened for service. On January 30, 2024, the rest of line from Periférico Oriente to Tláhuac reopened.

== History ==
=== Origins ===
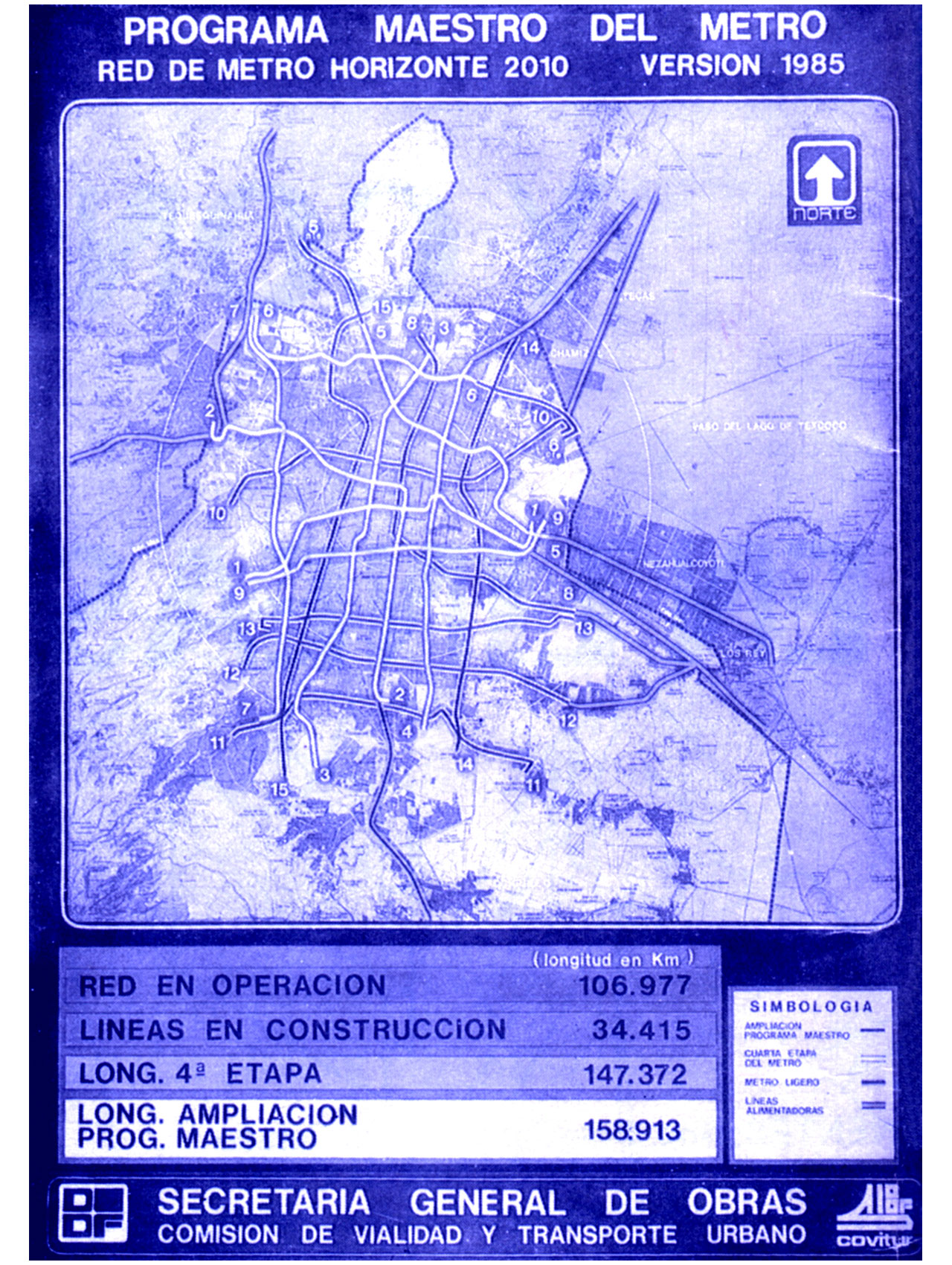
1985 plan for the Mexico City Metro with the earlier project for Line 12.

In the 1980s, the Comisión de Vialidad y Transporte Urbano (COVITUR), an organization of the Federal District Department, presented a plan for the Mexico City Metro based on several studies and reports related to the rapid growth of the city and its demand for public transportation. On the 1985 Metro Master Plan (Spanish: Programa Maestro del Metro de 1985), COVITUR considered a metro line that would run on the southern part of Mexico City from west to east and it designated as Line 12. It would run from Santa Lucía, in Álvaro Obregón, to Canal de Garay, in Iztapalapa (near Constitución de 1917 station). It would have had seventeen stations and a length of 18.97 kilometers (11.79 mi) and it would connect with Lines 2, 3, 4, 7 and 13, the last one another planned line.

In 1996, the Sistema de Transporte Colectivo (STC), the organization responsible for the metro, published its plan for the next 25 years, the 1995 Metro and Light Rail Master Plan (Spanish: Plan Maestro del Metro y Trenes Ligero). The document considered the new demand for public transport as well as the urban expansion towards the suburbs and the neighboring State of Mexico. Line 12 appeared again in the plan, with some changes, but the route was almost the same. The 1996 Line 12 project would start in Santa Lucía and it would end at a station called Francisco del Paso (otherwise known as Del Paso or Axomulco) in Iztacalco. The idea was that both Line 8 and Line 12 would share Francisco del Paso station as a transfer station; then, the stretch of Line 8 going from this new station (and the stations between Atlalilco and Constitución de 1917) would be transferred to Line 12, while Line 8 would have a new expansion from Francisco del Paso towards Acoxpa, in Tlalpan.

=== Announcement ===
In December 2006, the government of Mexico City announced the possible construction of a new metro line to satisfy the demand for public transportation in the south of the city, taking into consideration Line 12's original plans. In July 2007, the city announced a query among its citizens, named Consulta Verde, to choose between two routes. The line would go from Mixcoac to Iztapalapa; from there, there were two choices: Iztapalapa–Acoxpa or Iztapalapa–Tláhuac. The winning route became Iztapalapa–Tláhuac. Tláhuac, one of the easternmost Mexico City boroughs, did not have metro service by then. For the project, some of the stations for Line 11 were merged into Line 12 (from Culhuacán to Periférico Oriente—with almost all the names of the stations changed).

On 8 August 2007 the project was officially presented as "Línea 12: línea dorada, la línea del Bicentenario" (Line 12: Golden Line, the Bicentennial Line) and, thus, its chosen distinctive color was golden. The project was assigned to Proyecto Metro, which was headed by Enrique Horcasitas. The announced stations from west to east, with their original names, were: Mixcoac, Insurgentes Sur, 20 de Noviembre (later renamed to Hospital 20 de Noviembre), Zapata, Parque de los Venados, Eje Central (otherwise known as Popocatépetl), Ermita, Sur 69, Vía Láctea, Mexicaltzingo, Francisco del Paso, Ganaderos (otherwise known as Granaderos), Canal Nacional, ESIME Culhuacán, La Vírgen, Calle 11, Periférico Oriente, Tezonco (also known as San Lorenzo), Olivos (also known as Los Olivos), Francisco Villa (later renamed to Nopalera), Zapotitlán, Tlaltenco and Tláhuac. All but the last three were planned as underground stations.

== Construction ==
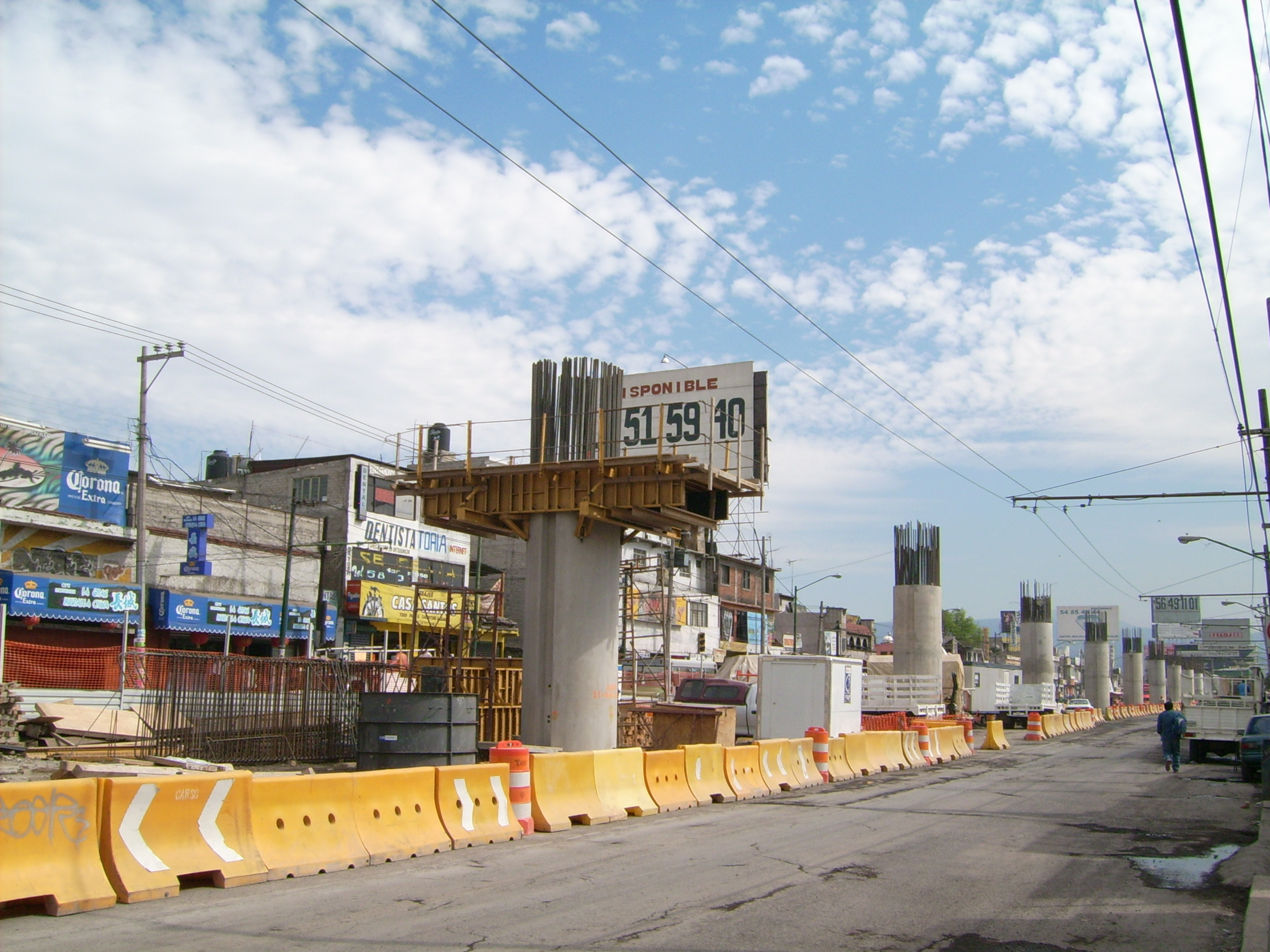
Construction of the elevated viaduct stretch of Line 12 on Avenida Tláhuac

Due to budget, time, and other setbacks, the line underwent several modifications. For instance, Sur 69 and Vía Láctea stations were not built due to neighborhood opposition. Ganaderos station was rejected by the National Institute of Anthropology and History because its construction would have affected a nearby archaeological site. Francisco del Paso station was canceled because its construction would have caused a six-month partial closure of Line 8; instead Atlalilco station was chosen as the interchange station and as a consequence it has the longest passenger transfer tunnel in the system. These issues caused the route to be changed. Instead of running along Arneses Avenue (Eje 3 Oriente) and later along Canal Nacional Avenue, the route was moved instead to run along Tláhuac Avenue (Ejes 9 and 10 Sur). ESIME Culhuacán and La Vírgen stations were relocated and became San Andrés Tomatlán and Lomas Estrella stations, respectively. Between Atlalilco and San Andrés Tomatlán, Culhuacán station was added to the route.

Construction of the first leg of the line, Tláhuac–Atlalilco, started on 23 September 2008. The section was replanned as an at-grade route to be later modified to a combined at-grade and elevated section. The second stretch of the line, which runs underground from Atlalilco to Mixcoac, was finished in April 2012. The line was built by a consortium comprised by ICA Group, Carso and Alstom.

The project suffered multiple construction delays, and its $1.3 billion cost was a 50% overrun.

=== Inauguration ===
Starting on 16 June 2012, the STC allowed riders to have access on Sundays to test the service and to familiarize them with the stations and route. The line began daily service on Monday 24 September 2012, and it was officially inaugurated on 30 October 2012 by Marcelo Ebrard, Head of Government of the Federal District from 2006 to 2012 and Felipe Calderón, President of Mexico from 2006 to 2012.

=== Temporary partial closure ===
In an unprecedented event in the history of Mexico City Metro, Line 12 had to be shut down temporarily in the stretch Tláhuac–Atlalilco due to severe faults in its infrastructure. This section is the one that corresponds to the elevated stretch of the line.

The technical and structural faults of the elevated stretch caused the trains to run on the verge of derailment, due to wear on the rails that provoked slopes and damage to the tires of the trains, putting six out of the 30 trains out of service. Drivers slowed trains to as little as 5 km/h (3.1 mph) on some stretches for fear of derailment.

The stretch was closed between 12 March 2014 and 29 November 2015, when the section going from Tezonco to Tláhuac was officially reopened by Miguel Ángel Mancera, Head of Government of the Federal District from 2012 to 2018. Previously, on October 27, 2015, the stretch Periférico Oriente–Culhuacán, resumed the service, but all trains stopped at Periférico Oriente station till the service on the whole line was reestablished.

=== 2017 earthquake ===
On 19 September 2017, a 7.1 magnitude earthquake hit Mexico City and other zones of Central Mexico, affecting Line 12 with electrical power shortages and the derailing of a train between the Nopalera and Zapotitlán stations. Due to this, and potential damages to the line's infrastructure, service in the Tláhuac–Culhuacán section of the line was suspended.

After evaluations, it was determined that the line had visible damages in the tracks and structural faults. Therefore, the stretch from Olivos to Tláhuac was closed for repairs. Service in all the closed stations was resumed on 30 October 2017.

=== Expansion ===
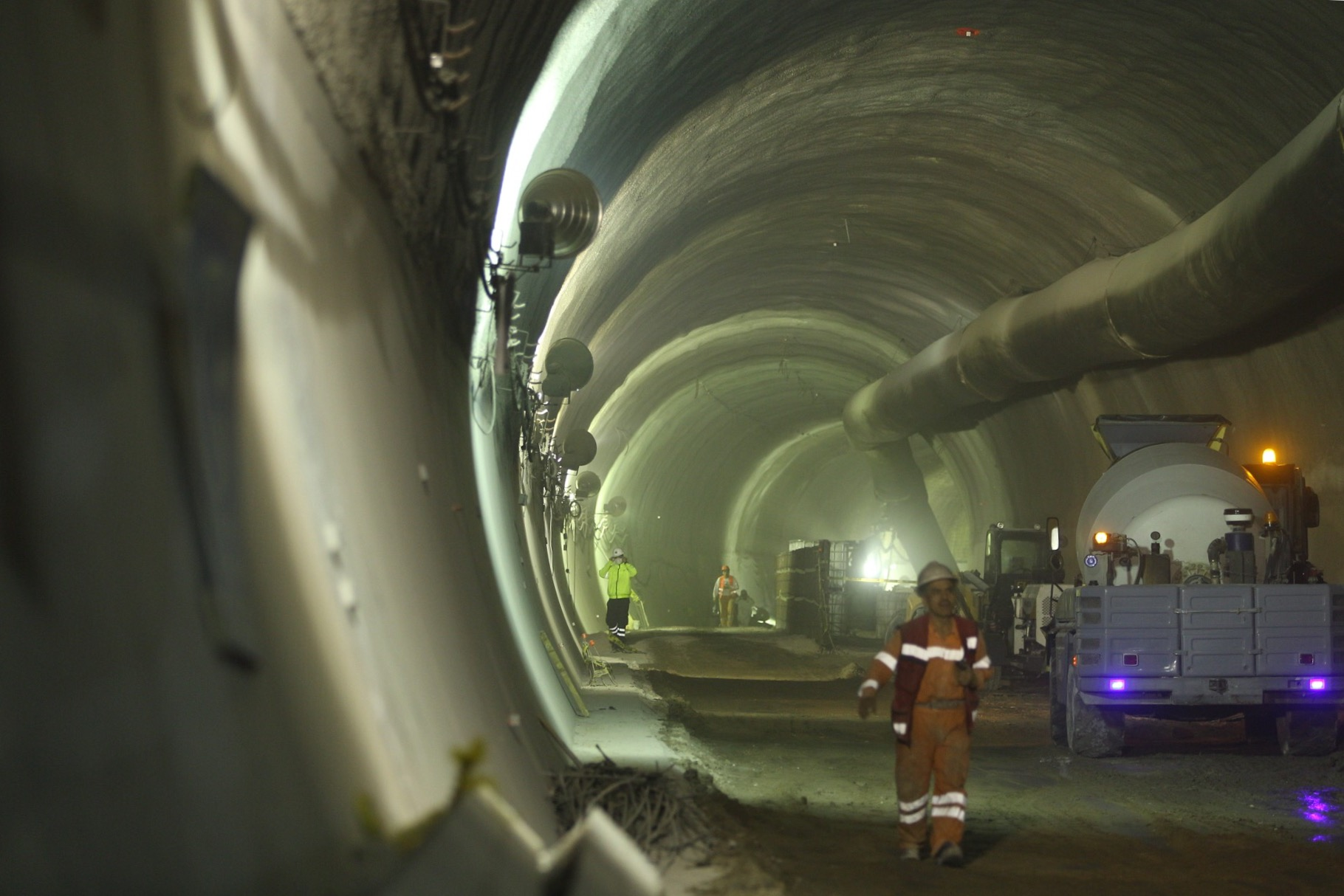
Construction works of the western expansion of Line 12

In 2017, an expansion for Line 12 was announced. Construction started on 29 November 2017. The extension was expected to be completed by 2020, but works were delayed, thus, being projected to open by 2021.

This project will extend the line from Mixcoac to Observatorio, where it will connect with Line 1 and it will have three new stations and a length of 3.5 km (2.2 mi). The two new stations are Valentín Campa and Álvaro Obregón, both situated in the Álvaro Obregón borough. The totality of the extension is being constructed underground and is expected to open in December 2023.

The original 1985 and 1996 plans for Line 12 considered the line going westward from Mixcoac with two new stations, as in the undergoing expansion. Nevertheless, the connection with Line 1 at Observatorio was not planned in the projects.

=== 2021 overpass collapse ===
On 3 May 2021, a section of an overpass collapsed at the Olivos station, resulting in 26 deaths and 79 injuries.

=== 2023 partial reopening of elevated section ===
On 15 July 2023, the stretch between Periférico Oriente and Culhuacán reopened.

== Route ==
Mixcoac station, the provisional western terminus of the line, lies along Extremadura Avenue (Eje 7 Sur), in the neighborhood of the same name. The line heads eastward along the avenue to Insurgentes Sur station at the intersection with Insurgentes Sur Avenue. Eje 7 Sur changes its name to Félix Cuevas Avenue and the track continues to Hospital 20 de Noviembre (next to the hospital of the same name). As the line reaches Zapata station, the avenue changes its name to General Emiliano Zapata Avenue, and continues to Parque de los Venados station (next to the public park of the same name). As the line reaches División del Norte Avenue, the line turns and runs along it. Then, when the route gets to Popocatépetl Avenue (Eje 8 Sur), it turns again and arrives at Eje Central station, located below the avenue of the same name. As the line arrives at Ermita station, the avenue changes its name to Calzada Ermita Iztapalapa. It passes Mexicaltzingo station and later arrives at Atlalilco station.

The line continues until the intersection with Tláhuac Avenue (Eje 9 Sur and later Eje 10 Sur) and the track emerges to the surface to become an elevated railway. It continues along the avenue to Culhuacán, San Andrés Tomatlán, Lomas Estrella, Calle 11, Periférico Oriente, Tezonco, Olivos, Nopalera and Zapotitlán stations. When Tláhuac Avenue reaches Canal del Acalote Avenue, the track turns and descends to the street level. It arrives at Tlaltenco station, and later to the southeastern terminal of Tláhuac, along San Rafael Atlixco Avenue.

== Rolling stock ==
The FE-10 model, by Construcciones y Auxiliar de Ferrocarriles (CAF), is a steel-wheeled train model exclusively used on Line 12. As of May 2021, 30 trains are operating in the line. The trains were built by CAF in Spain.

== Station list ==
Key (Note: The following list was adapted from different websites and official maps.: Metro connections obtained from the official Mexico City Metro system map.; Accessibility obtained from the Mexico City Metro system map. In some cases, the map omits the accessibility icon as the station(s) are actually partially accessible. However, the respective websites of each station on the official site indicate the respective accessibility methods. Stations with the symbol ‡ are fully accessible; stations with the symbol † are partially accessible.; Cablebús obtained from their official website.; Centro de transferencia modal (CETRAM;) obtained from the official website of the Órgano Regulador de Transporte.; Ecobici obtained from their official website.; Metrobús obtained from the Mexico City Metrobús system map.; Mexibús obtained from the official Mexico City Metro system map.; Mexicable obtained from the official Mexico City Metro system map.; Public buses network (peseros) obtained from the official website of the Órgano Regulador de Transporte.; Red de Transporte de Pasajeros obtained from their official website.; Trolleybuses obtained from their official website.)
Handicapped/disabled access	Fully accessible station	Cablebús Line {{{3}}}	Cablebús connection	Red de Transporte de Pasajeros	RTP connection
Handicapped/disabled access	Partially accessible station	Mexibús	Mexibús connection	Tren Interurbano	Tren Interurbano connection
Transfer hub	CETRAM transfer station	Mexicable	Mexicable connection	Tren Suburbano	Tren Suburbano connection
Transfer hub	ETRAM transfer station	Mexico City Metro	Mexico City Metro connection	Trolleybus	Trolleybus connection
Ecobici	Ecobici bikeshare	Mexico City minubus	Pesero connection	Xochimilco Light Rail	Xochimilco Light Rail connection

The stations from west to east:

No.	Station (Note: All the stations are fully accessible to people with disabilities.)	Date opened	Level	Distance (km)		Connection	Pictogram	Location
No.	Station	Date opened	Level	Between stations	Total	Connection	Pictogram	Location
01	Mixcoac	30 October 2012	Underground, deep trench	-	0.0	1D, 13A, 115A, 116, 119B, 124, 124A, 200	A snake	Benito Juárez
02	Insurgentes Sur	30 October 2012	Underground, deep trench	0.8	0.8	(at Félix Cuevas); 6A (at distance)	Miguel Hidalgo and José Morelos	Benito Juárez
03	Hospital 20 de Noviembre	30 October 2012	Underground, deep trench	0.9	1.7	6A (at distance)	The structure of the hospital's roof	Benito Juárez
04	Zapata	30 October 2012	Underground, deep trench	0.6	2.3	1D, 52C, 120, 121A; 6A	Emiliano Zapata	Benito Juárez
05	Parque de los Venados	30 October 2012	Underground, deep trench	0.7	3.0	6A	Two deers	Benito Juárez
06	Eje Central	30 October 2012	Underground, deep trench	1.4	4.4	(at Popocatépetl), 52C; 6A	A trolleybus	Benito Juárez
07	Ermita	30 October 2012	Underground, deep trench	1.0	5.4	2A, 31B, 52C, 111A, 145A; 6A (at distance), 17C, 17H, 17I	A chapel	Benito Juárez
08	Mexicaltzingo	30 October 2012	Underground, trench	2.0	7.4	1D, 37, 52C; 5A, 6A	An inverted maguey plant	Iztapalapa
09	Atlalilco	30 October 2012	Underground, trench	2.1	9.5	1D, 52C; 6A	A water well	Iztapalapa
10	Culhuacán	30 October 2012	Elevated	1.8	11.3	Routes: Z3A, Z3B	An aztec glyph of Culhuacán	Iztapalapa
11	San Andrés Tomatlán	30 October 2012	Elevated	1.1	12.4	Z3F, Z3G, Z3H	The local church of San Andrés Apostol	Iztapalapa
12	Lomas Estrella	30 October 2012	Elevated	1.2	13.6	Z3G, Z3H	A star above the hills	Iztapalapa
13	Calle 11	30 October 2012	Elevated	1.1	14.7	Z3G, Z3H	Water vessel	Iztapalapa
14	Periférico Oriente	30 October 2012	Elevated	1.3	16.0	47A, 57A, 57C, 162	Prison guard tower	Iztapalapa
15	Tezonco	30 October 2012	Elevated	1.7	17.7	162	A calavera	Iztapalapa
16	Olivos	30 October 2012	Elevated	0.6	18.3	162	An olive	Tláhuac
17	Nopalera	30 October 2012	Elevated	1.5	19.8	162	A flowering nopal	Tláhuac
18	Zapotitlán	30 October 2012	Elevated	1.5	21.3	162, 162D	A toothed sapote tree with three branches	Tláhuac
19	Tlaltenco	30 October 2012	At grade	1.3	22.6		La Puerta stone gateway	Tláhuac
20	Tláhuac	30 October 2012	At grade	1.5	24.1	141, 148, 149	The shield of Tláhuac	Tláhuac

== Extension ==
A possible extension of the line to connect it with Line 1 at Observatorio station was announced in February 2013, thus making Observatorio the new west terminus of the line. The project was approved in September 2013 by Gerardo Ruiz Esparza, Secretary of Communications and Transportation.

Construction started on 29 November 2017. The extension was expected to be completed by 2020, but works were delayed, thus, being projected to open by 2021. In September 2020, it was announced that works on Line 12 will be finished by the end of 2022 and that service will begin in 2023. Further delays have occurred and as of August 2025 just little above half of the project has been completed.

The stretch will have three underground stations: Álvaro Obregón, Valentín Campa and Observatorio, in the Álvaro Obregón borough.

No.	Station	Date opened	Situation	Distance (km)		Connections	Location
No.	Station	Date opened	Situation	Between stations	Total	Connections	Location
21	Valentín Campa	TBA	Underground, deep tunnel	1.5	25.6		Álvaro Obregón
22	Álvaro Obregón	TBA	Underground, deep tunnel	1.4	27.0		Álvaro Obregón
23	Observatorio	TBA	Underground, deep tunnel	0.6	27.6	El Insurgente; 21D; West Bus Terminal	Álvaro Obregón

== Ridership ==
According to the data provided by the authorities, the line registered 134,900,367 entrances, averaging 369,590 commuters per day in 2019. Tláhuac is the busiest station on the line—and one of the busiest of the system—averaging 56,831 entrances that year; in contrast Tlaltenco station averaged fewer than 5,000 passengers per day and consistently ranks among the least used on the Metro network.

Line 12 annual passenger ridership (2014–2023)
Year	Ridership	Average daily	% change	Ref.
2023	46,018,232	126,077	NA	
2022	0	0	NA	
2021	22,071,358	60,469	−71.78%	
2020	78,214,776	213,701	−42.02%	
2019	134,900,367	369,590	+7.14%	
2018	125,915,705	334,974	+10.22%	
2017	114,245,007	313,000	+8.50%	
2016	105,297,900	287,699	+95.23%	
2015	53,936,100	147,770	−6.19%	
2014	57,496,027	157,523	−37.49%	

Annual passenger ridership by station (2019)
Rank	System rank	Station	Total ridership	Average daily
1	14	Tláhuac‡	20,743,670	56,831
2	25	Insurgentes Sur	12,976,044	35,550
3	34	Periférico Oriente	12,095,813	33,139
4	62	Tezonco	8,443,023	23,131
5	71	Nopalera	8,209,571	22,491
6	93	Mexicaltzingo	6,981,386	19,127
7	102	Olivos	6,513,892	17,846
8	111	Mixcoac†‡	5,956,326	16,318
9	118	Culhuacán	5,583,585	15,297
10	123	Calle 11	5,309,588	14,546
11	125	Zapata†	5,187,865	14,213
12	127	Atlalilco†	5,112,833	14,007
13	130	Zapotitlán	4,994,118	13,682
14	137	San Andrés Tomatlán	4,514,716	12,369
15	139	Lomas Estrella	4,481,178	12,277
16	142	Hospital 20 de Noviembre	4,290,490	11,754
17	144	Parque de los Venados	4,249,439	11,642
18	147	Eje Central	4,077,416	11,171
19	151	Ermita†	3,904,630	10,697
20	192	Tlaltenco	1,274,784	3,492
Total			134,900,367	369,590

†	Transfer station
‡	Terminal
†‡	Transfer station and terminal

== See also ==
- List of Mexico City Metro lines
