= Superior Auditor of the Federation =

Supreme audit institution of Mexico

- Auditoría Superior de la Federación
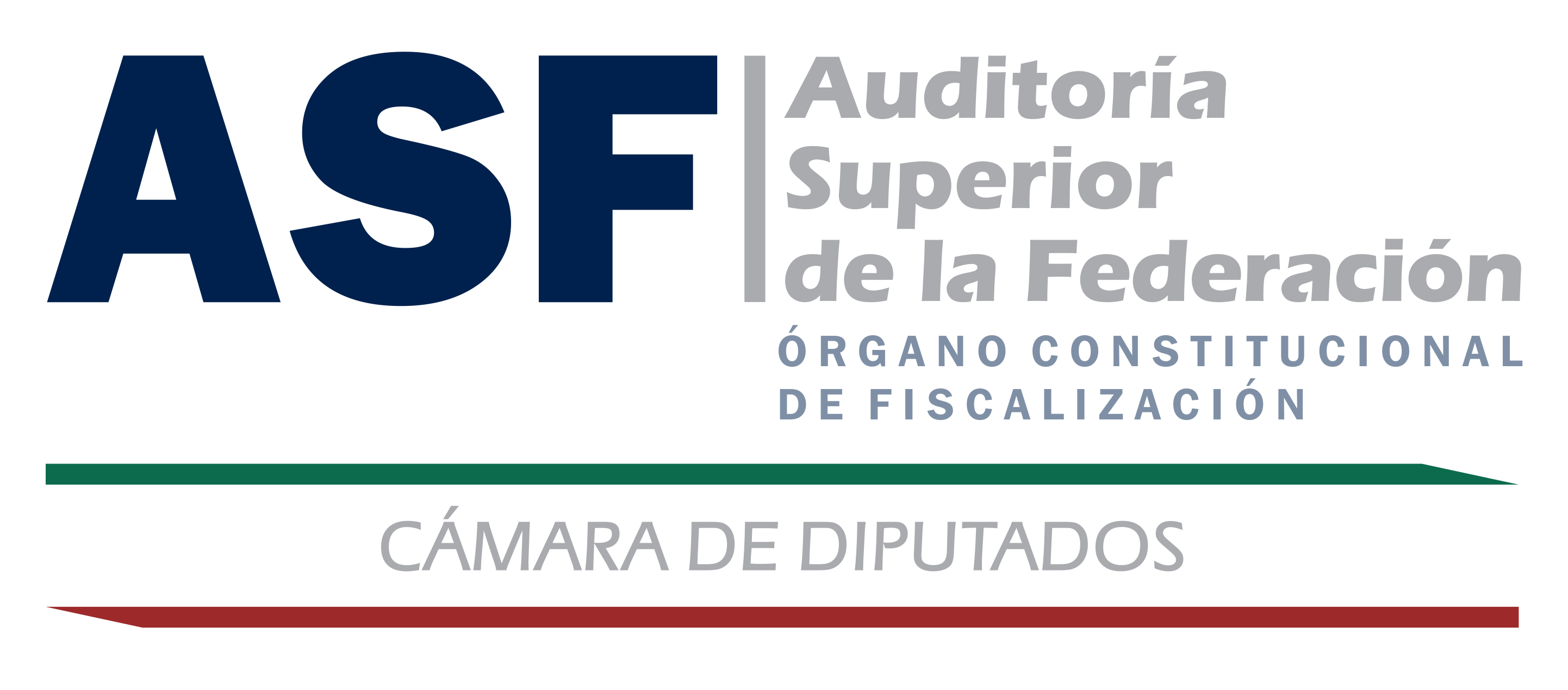

Agency overview
- Formed: December 30, 2000
- Agency executive: David Colmenares Páramo
- Website: www.asf.gob.mx

The Superior Auditor of the Federation (Spanish: Auditoría Superior de la Federación, ASF) is the supreme audit institution of Mexico. A technical agency of the Chamber of Deputies, it is empowered to conduct external audits of federal, state and local governments and agencies. The ASF is a member of the International Organization of Supreme Audit Institutions.

The director of the ASF as of March 2018 is David Colmenares Páramo.

== History ==
=== Predecessor agencies ===
The power of auditing the public finances was awarded to Congress in the Constitution of 1824. On November 16 of that year, Congress passed the Decreto de la Ley de Arreglo de la Administración de la Hacienda Pública (Decree of the Law of Organization of the Administration of the Public Treasury), which created the Contaduría Mayor de Hacienda (Accounting Office of the Treasury), an agency of the Chamber of Deputies charged with the "examination and review of public accounts".

Between the 1830s and 1860s, the existence of the Contaduría Mayor de Hacienda alternated with that of a Court of Accounts. The Tribunal for the Review of Accounts existed from 1838 to 1846; another Court of Accounts existed between 1853 and 1857, and such a court was also in place from 1865 to 1867 during the Second Mexican Empire. The Contaduría Mayor de Hacienda was restored in 1867 and operated under that name until 2000, though it was reformed several times in 1896, 1904, 1937 and 1978.

=== Formation of the ASF ===
In 1999, Congress passed constitutional reforms that paved the way for the replacement of the Contaduría Mayor de Hacienda. On December 30, the Ley de Fiscalización Superior de la Federación (Law of Superior Auditing of the Federation) came into effect. The new law increased the technical and management autonomy of the agency; expanded its remit to include the legislative and judicial branches, autonomous constitutional agencies, and federal resources transferred to state and municipal governments; and permitted the new Superior Auditor of the Federation to issue monetary fines, a function that previously belonged to an executive branch agency. The ASF began functioning on December 30, 2000; its first director was the former Accountant of the Treasury, Gregorio Guerrero Pozas, who remained in the post for the first year of the new agency's life. In 2005, a revision to the organic law explicitly allowed the ASF to audit public trusts.

Further constitutional reforms in 2008 led to the passage of a new organic law for the agency, the Ley de Fiscalización y Rendición de Cuentas de la Federación (Law of Auditing and Evaluation of the Federation), in 2009. Three updates were passed to this law, in 2010, 2016 and 2021; the second established the National Anticorruption System, of which the ASF became a part. These successive changes have further expanded the scope of the ASF's functions; in its series of audits of the 2016 public account, the ASF conducted 9 percent more audits as a result of its new remit.

In 2017, the ASF moved into a new headquarters building in southern Mexico City, consolidating its 2,500 employees into one facility.

== Audits ==
In 2013, the ASF audited the Line 12 of the Mexico City Metro. The institution found 11 anomalies, concluding that "in general terms, the Government of the Federal District did not comply with the applicable legal and regulatory provisions". After the 2017 Puebla earthquake, the ASF made observations of damage to an elevated section of track between the Olivos and Tezonco stations, which collapsed in May 2021.

In 2017, the ASF detected the embezzlement of 110 million pesos from the Secretariat of Agrarian, Land, and Urban Development (SEDATU) while Rosario Robles ran the agency. As of February 2021, the ASF had promoted 39 criminal charges covering the misuse of 6 billion pesos against Robles, who ran SEDATU and the Secretariat of Social Development (SEDESOL) during Enrique Peña Nieto's presidency, in what is called La Estafa Maestra ("The Master Scam").

The ASF noted that the National Guard had overpaid by 480 million pesos for software acquired from Israeli company Cybergloves Ltd. in 2018, which led to the commissioner taking an indefinite leave of absence in March 2020.

== Criticism ==
In the context of severe attacks to its independence by the executive power, the ASF was criticized in 2021 for admitting the presence of errors in its analysis of the costs incurred in cancelling the Mexico City Texcoco Airport project, many saw this as a forced retraction; President Andrés Manuel López Obrador claimed the auditors had acted "in bad faith". The auditor responsible was placed on administrative leave.
