= FE-10 (Mexico City Metro) =

Type of electrical multiple unit train used on the Mexico City Metro

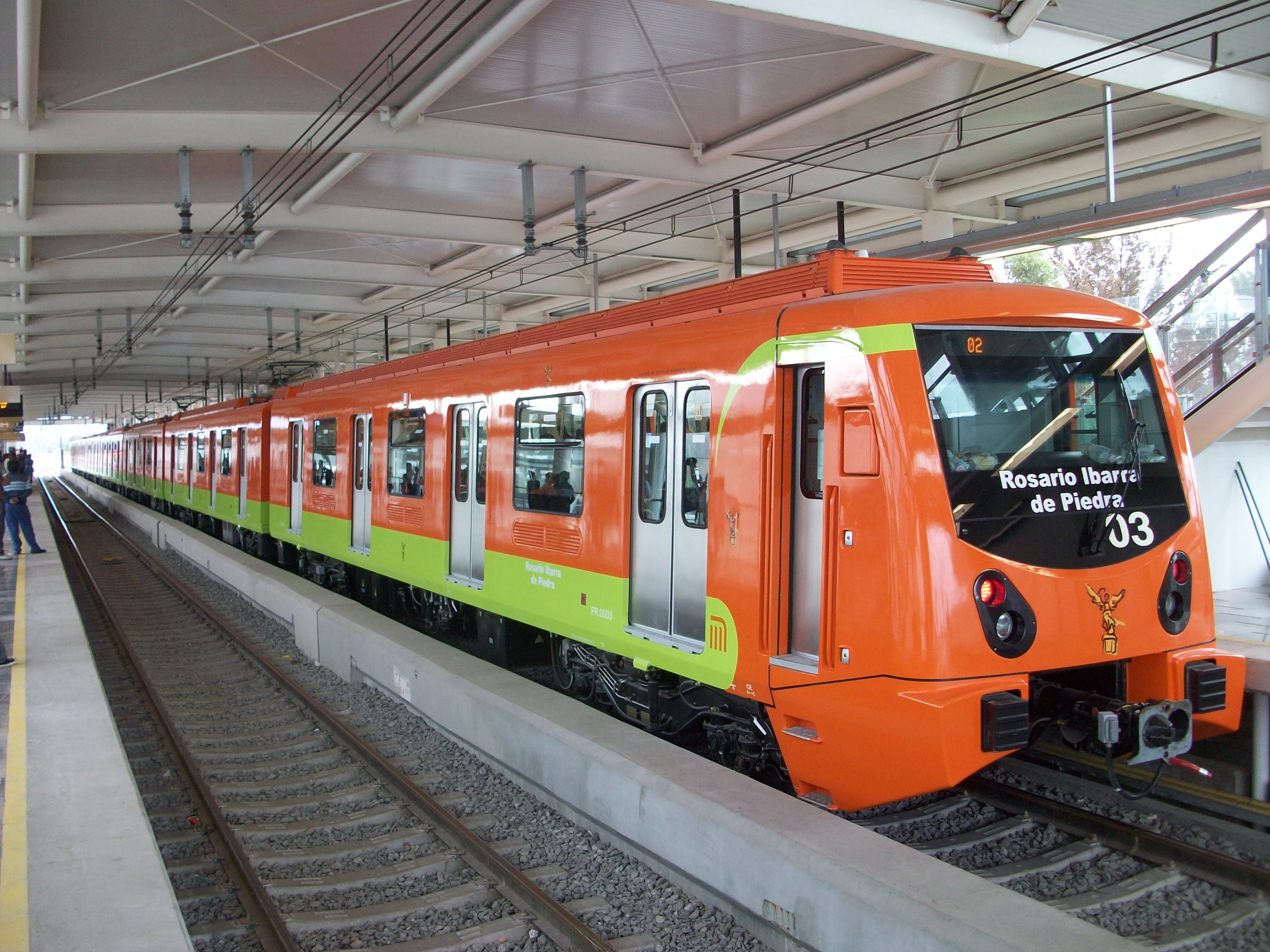
- FE-10 in Line 12 of Mexico City Metro.

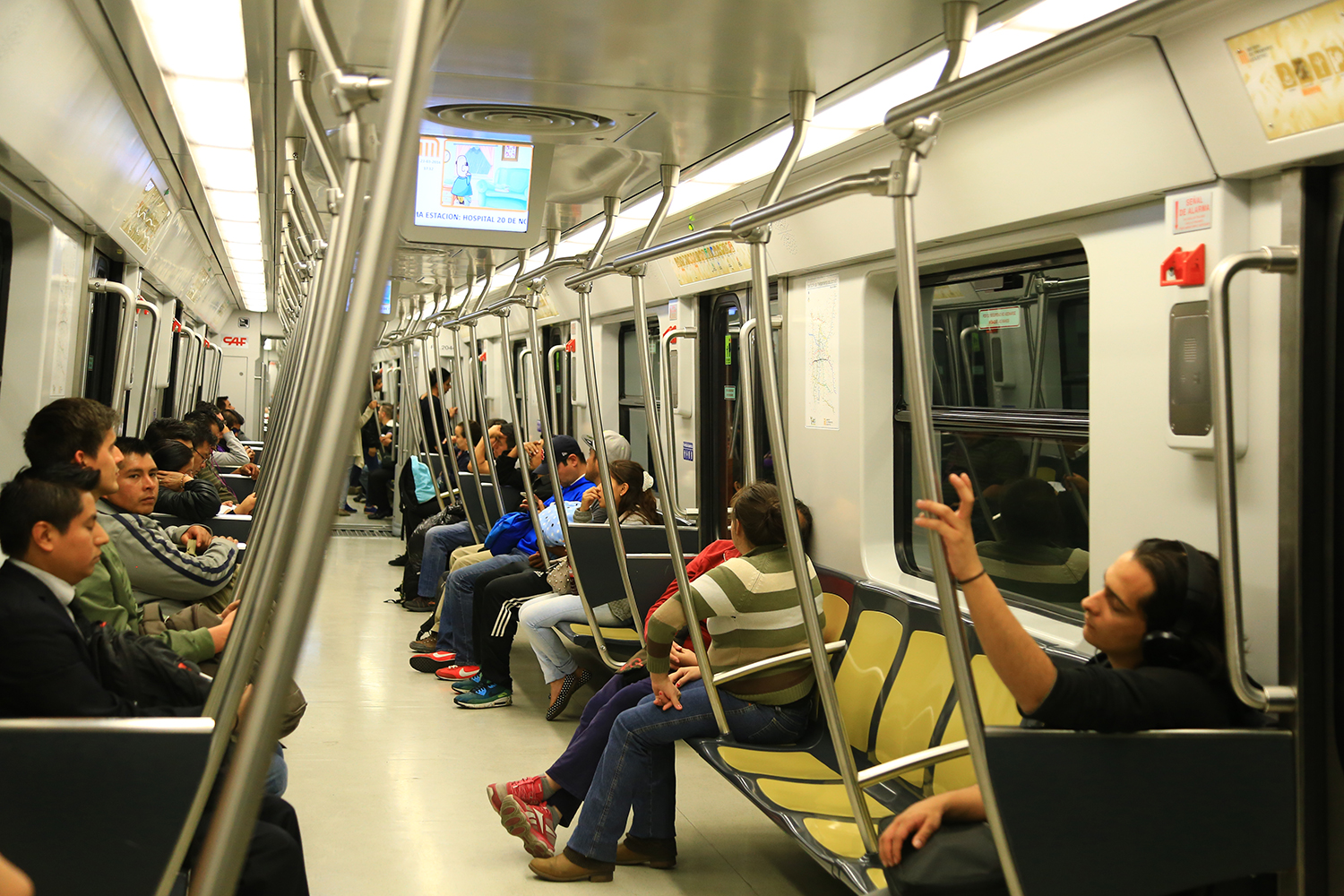
- Interior of an FE-10 car
- In service: 2012–present
- Manufacturer: CAF
- Entered service: 30 October 2012
- Number built: 210 cars (30 trains)
- Formation: 7 cars per trainset
- Capacity: 1471
- Operator: STC
- Line served: Mexico City Metro Line 12

Specifications
- Train length: 141 m (462 ft 7 in)
- Width: 280 cm (9 ft 2 in)
- Maximum speed: 90 km/h (56 mph)
- Weight: 238 t (525,000 lb)
- Traction system: Mitsubishi 2-level IGBT-VVVF
- Power output: 4,065 kW (5,451 hp)
- Electric systems: Overhead line, 1,500 V DC
- Current collection: Pantograph
- Track gauge: 1,435 mm (4 ft 8 1/2 in) standard gauge

The FE-10 (abbreviated from the Spanish: Férreo Español 2010) is a steel-wheeled model of electrical multiple units used on the Mexico City Metro, first used in 2012 and currently servicing Line 12.

== Conception ==
In 2009, while Mexico City Metro Line 12 was still under construction, Spanish Construcciones y Auxiliar de Ferrocarriles (CAF) was awarded the contract to supply 30 trains of seven cars each for Line 12 for an approximate amount of 1 billion euros.

CAF had previously supplied trains for the Mexico City Metro such as the NE-92 and NM-02.

== Description ==
The FE–10 currently services Line 12 only. Each train is equipped with vehicle control and monitoring system, ATP-ATO automatic driving system, passenger information and video entertainment systems, CCTV, and saloon and cab ventilation systems.

The entire length of a train is 141 meters (463 ft).

In 2015, Technischer Überwachungsverein made a recommendation to STC to change the trains due to certification problems that mainly affect an excessive wear for the steel wheels and the rails.

== Technical specifications ==
- Train length: 140.270 m (460 ft 2 1/2 in)
- Overall width: 2.400 m (7 ft 10 1/2 in)
- Height of a train car above the running surface: 3.485 m (11 ft 5 1/4 in)
- Floor height above the running surface: 1.180 m (46.46 in)
- Weight in running order: 126.4 tonnes (124.4 long tons; 139.3 short tons)
- Maximum capacity (at six travelers / m^{2}): 1471 passengers
- Folding seats available off-peak: 146
- Maximum speed: 90 km/h (56 mph)
- Maximum power: 4,065 kW (5,451 hp)
- Average acceleration of 1.2 m/s^{2} (3.9 ft/s^{2})
- Maximum braking normal steady state: 2 m/s^{2} (6.6 ft/s^{2})

== Train names ==
Out of the 30 trains in service, nine of them have been named, honoring several prominent Mexican people from the 20th century.

No.	Name	Opening date
1	Ing. Cuauhtémoc Cárdenas Solórzano (†)	15 March 2012
2	Rosario Ibarra de Piedra (†)	12 June 2012
3	Elena Poniatowska	19 June 2012
4	Dr. Mario Molina Premio Nobel (†)	29 June 2012
5	Antonio Enríquez Savignac (†)	19 July 2012
6	Arq. Teodoro González de León (†)	22 August 2012
7	Arq. Ricardo Legorreta (†)	25 September 2012
8	Carlos Fuentes (†)	21 November 2012
9	Valentín Campa Salazar (†)	14 February 2013
