= Atlalilco metro station =

Mexico City metro station

Atlalilco
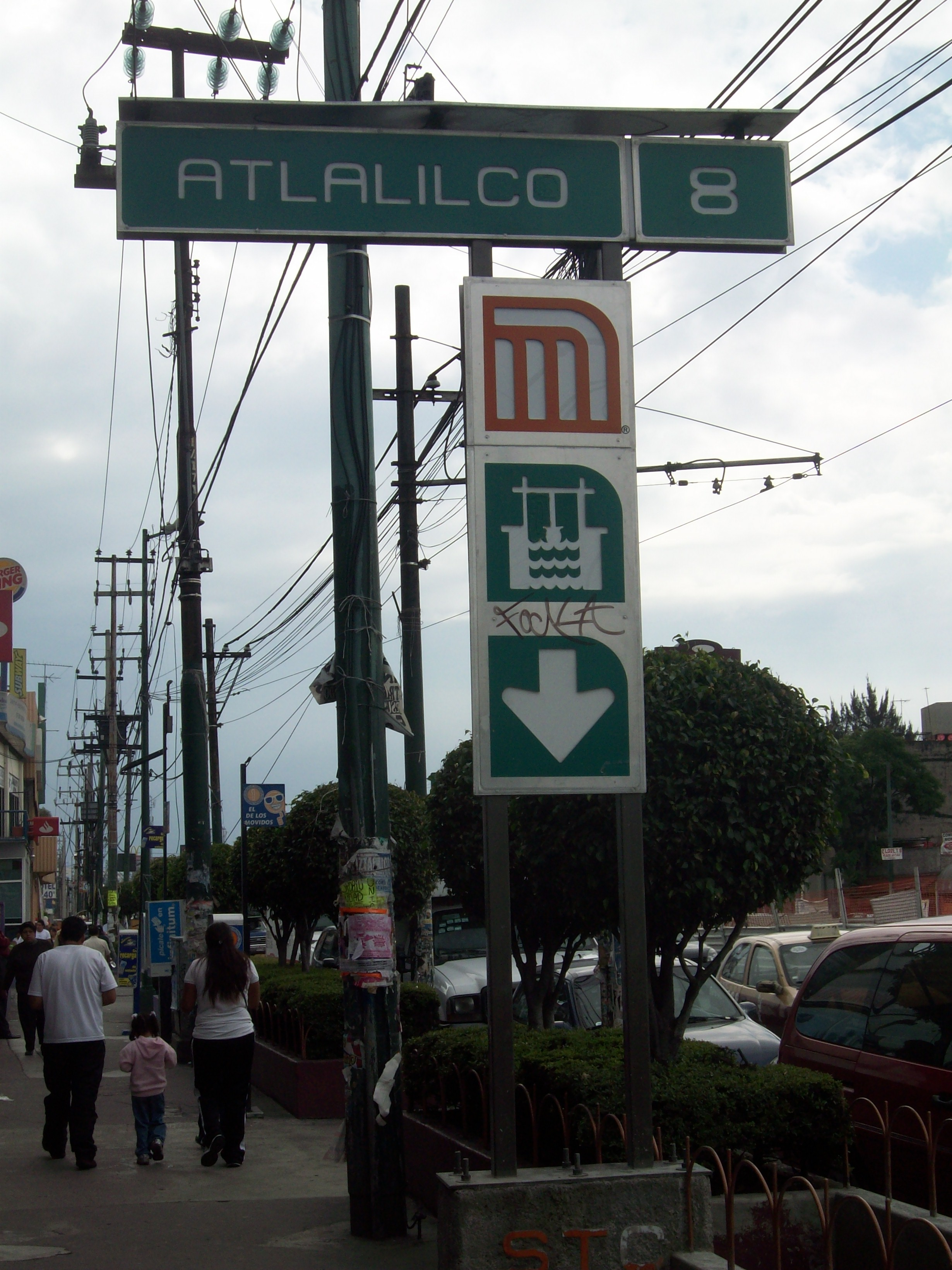

General information
- Location: Mexico
- Coordinates: 19.356134°N 99.101315°W
- System: Mexico City Metro
- Operator: Sistema de Transporte Colectivo (STC)
- Platforms: 4 side platforms
- Tracks: 4

Construction
- Structure type: Underground
- Accessible: yes

Other information
- Status: In service

History
- Opened: 20 July 1994; 30 October 2012

Key dates
- 3 May 2021: Temporarily closed
- 15 January 2023: Reopened

Passengers
- 2023: Total: 11,350,211; 5,005,606; 6,344,605 ▲107.75%
- Rank: 94/195; 70/195

Services
Preceding station	Mexico City Metro	Following station
Escuadrón 201 toward Garibaldi / Lagunilla	Line 8	Iztapalapa toward Constitución de 1917
Mexicaltzingo toward Mixcoac	Line 12	Culhuacán toward Tláhuac
Route map
Location
- Location within Mexico City
- Area map

Atlalilco is a station along Line 8 and Line 12 of the metro of Mexico City. Atlalilco is a transfer station between the Line 12 and Line 8. Line 8 station is located on the Calzada Ermita Iztapalapa, while Line 12 station is located on Avenida Tláhuac, in the Colonia Santa Isabel Industrial neighbourhood.

The station's logo is a well of water. Atlalilco in Nahuatl means: "where water is kept". It opened for service along Line 8 on 20 July 1994. The distance of the interstation tunnel is about 800 m (2,625 ft) long because the original plan for a transfer station to be named Axomulco was canceled. The interstation tunnel runs underground through Calzada Ermita Iztapalapa and Avenida Tlahuac, with an additional access to the station at the intersection of both avenues. It is the only station that has mechanical bands to assist in the interstation walk.

== Ridership ==
Annual passenger ridership (Line 8)
Year	Ridership	Average daily	Rank	% change	Ref.
2023	5,005,606	13,713	94/195	−10.84%
2022	5,614,055	15,380	71/195	+21.63%
2021	4,615,611	12,645	58/195	+45.23%
2020	3,178,039	8,683	113/195	−43.36%
2019	5,611,383	15,373	117/195	−1.47%
2018	5,694,912	15,602	116/195	+8.04%
2017	5,271,085	14,441	121/195	−3.98%
2016	5,489,819	14,999	120/195	−1.50%
2015	5,573,190	15,269	112/195	+2.72%
2014	5,425,564	14,864	110/195	−1.84%

Annual passenger ridership (Line 12)
Year	Ridership	Average daily	Rank	% change	Ref.
2023	6,344,605	17,382	70/195	NA
2022	0	0	176/195	−100.00%
2021	847,723	2,322	183/195	−71.20%
2020	2,943,812	8,043	119/195	−42.42%
2019	5,112,833	14,007	127/195	+4.10%
2018	4,911,648	13,456	127/195	+7.90%
2017	4,551,908	12,470	131/195	+1.21%
2016	4,497,651	12,288	133/195	−67.05%
2015	13,651,138	37,400	27/195	−6.14%
2014	14,544,147	39,846	23/195	+319.58%
