= List of Mexico City Metro stations =

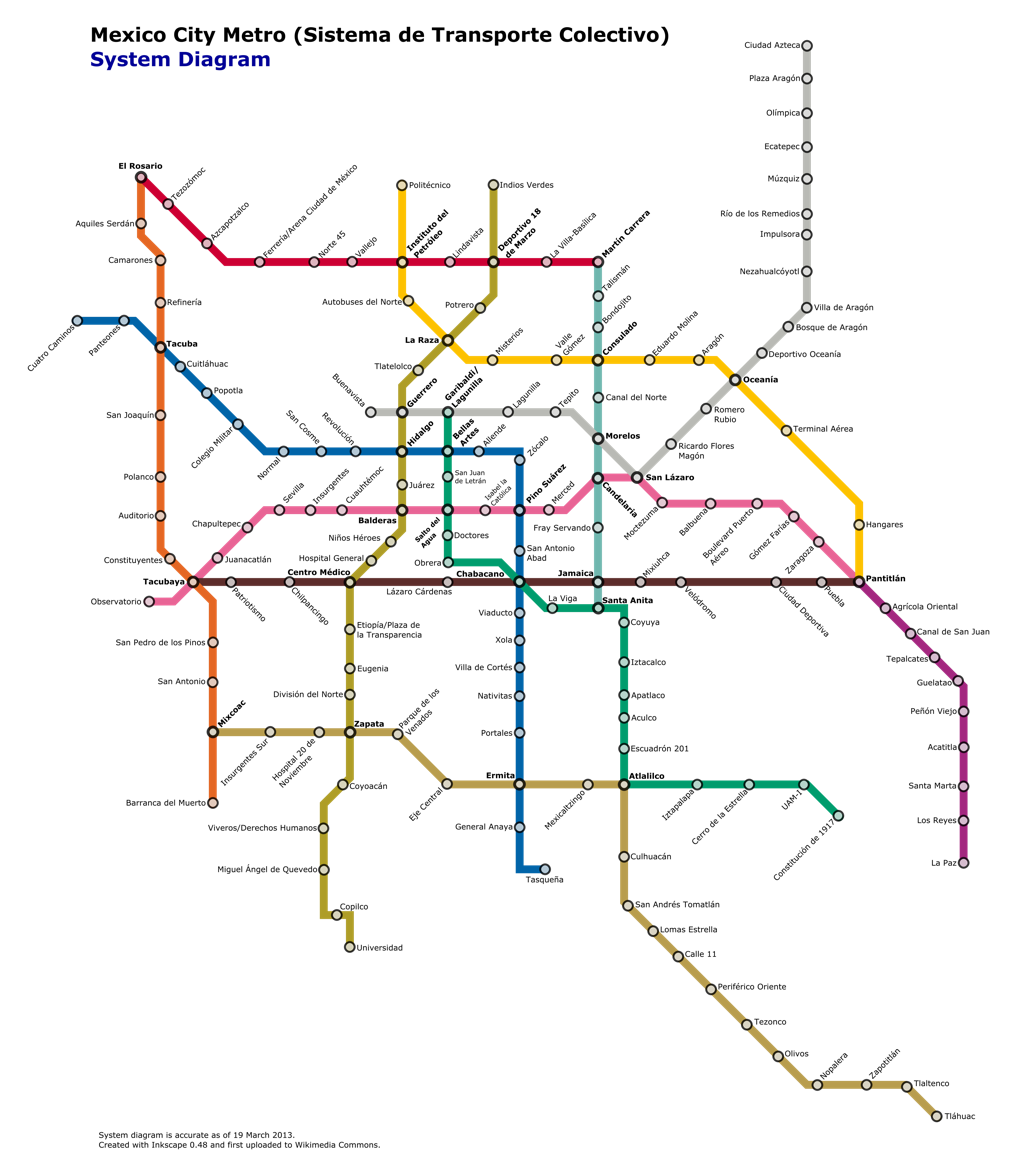
Schematic map of the Mexico City Metro

The Mexico City Metro is a rapid transit system serving Greater Mexico City. The system has 12 lines, 195 stations and a total network length of 226.5 km (140.7 mi), including maintenance tracks.

== List of stations ==
The following table lists alphabetically all 195 metro stations of the Mexico City Metro system; the line or lines serving each station; the year the station opened; the type of station (underground, elevated or at-grade); and other transportation services the station has connections with, such as the Mexico City Metrobús (a bus rapid transit system), the Mexico City Light Rail, STE trolleybus networks, and the RTP bus system.

| † | Transfer station |
| ‡ | Terminal |
| †‡ | Transfer station and terminal |

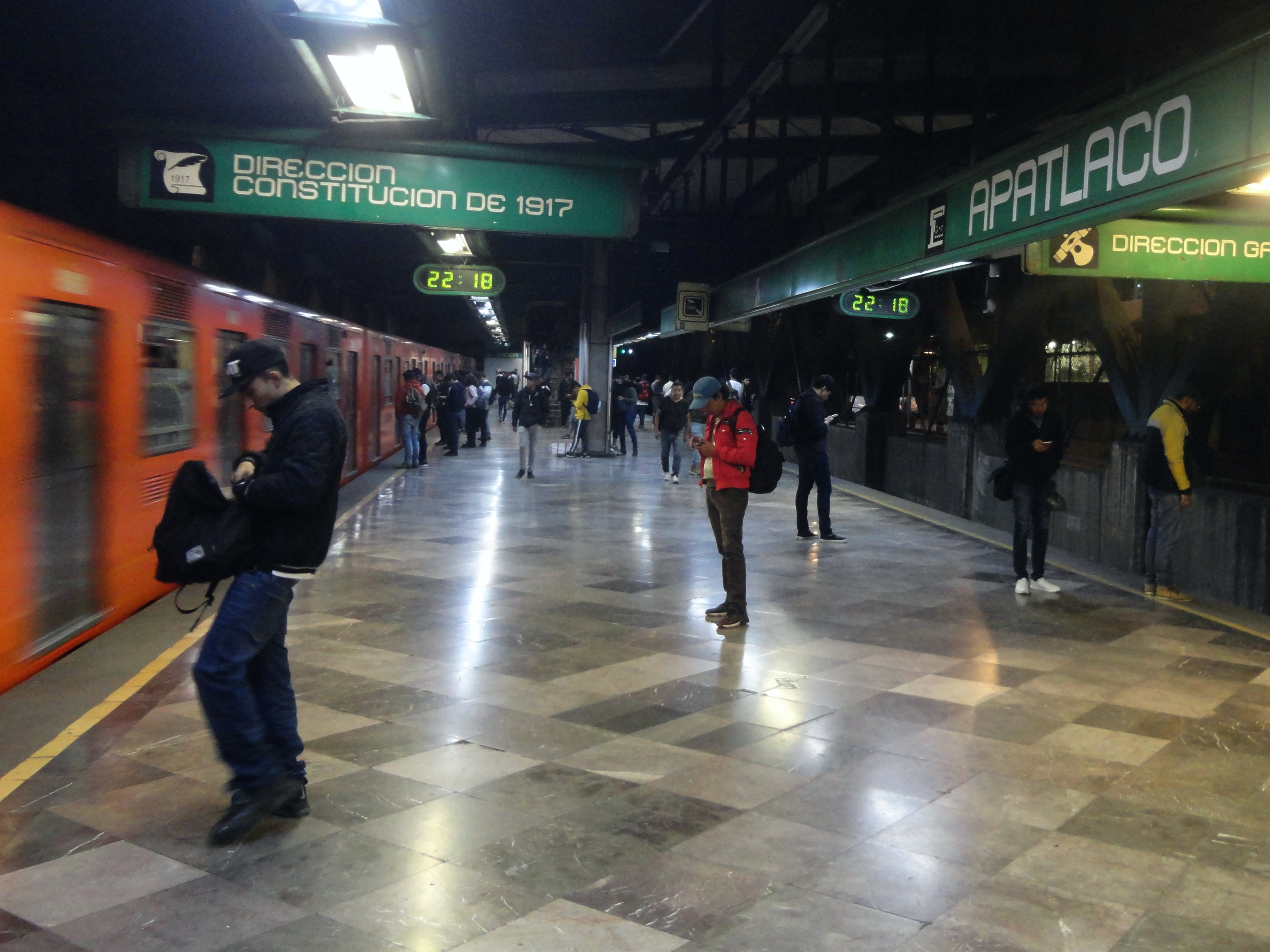
Apatlaco

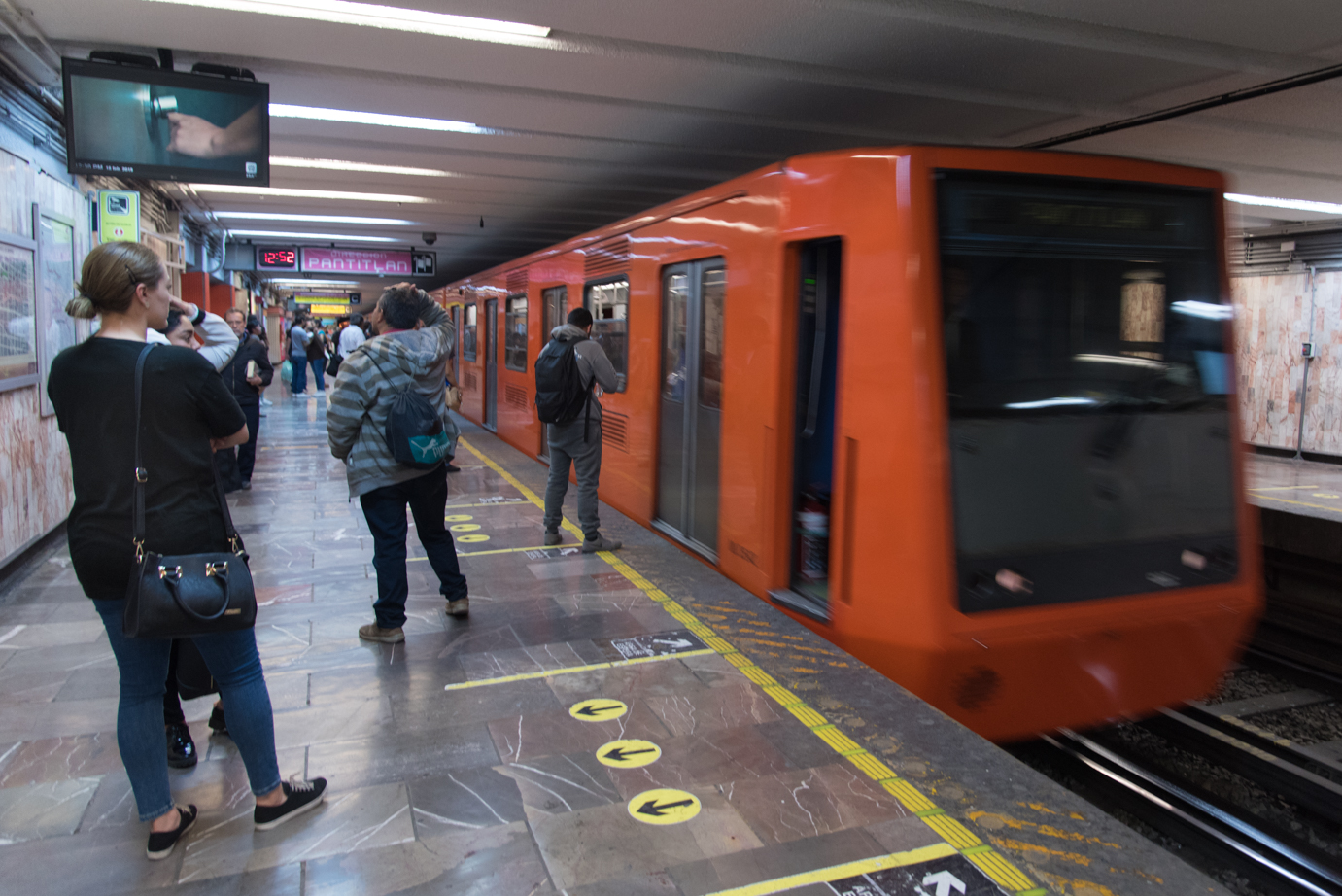
Balderas, Line 1 platforms

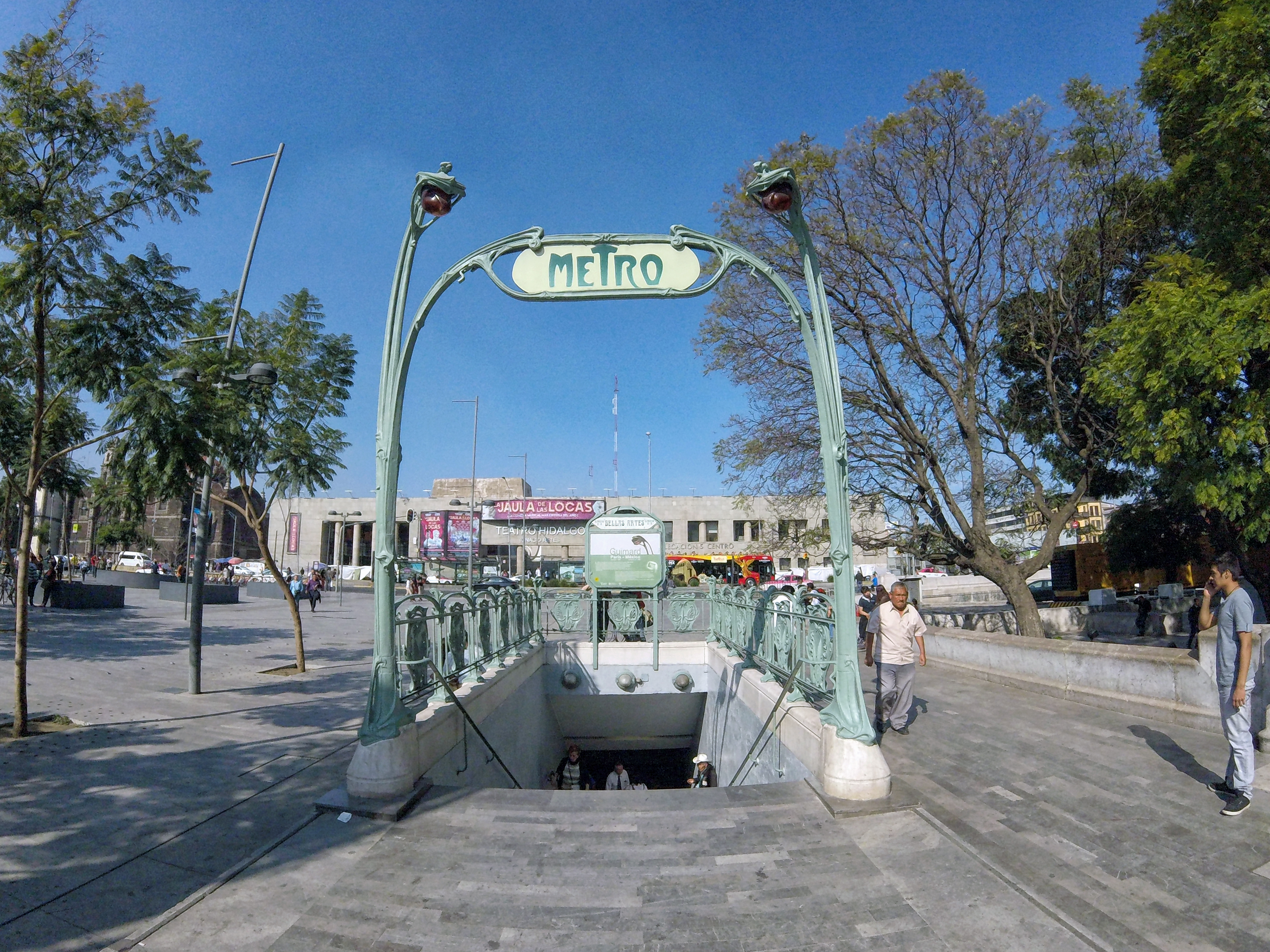
Bellas Artes, art nouveau entrance to the station

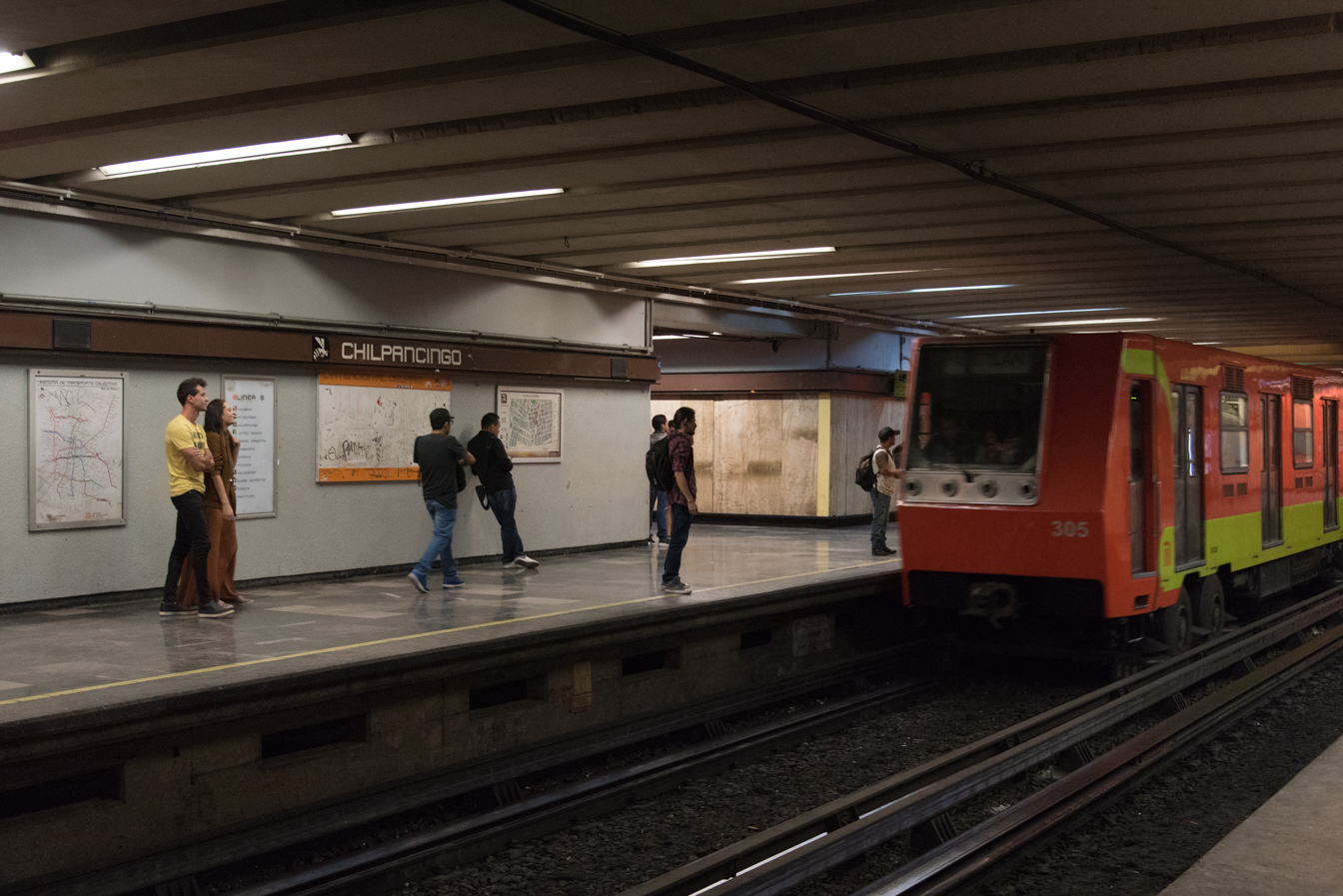
Chilpancingo

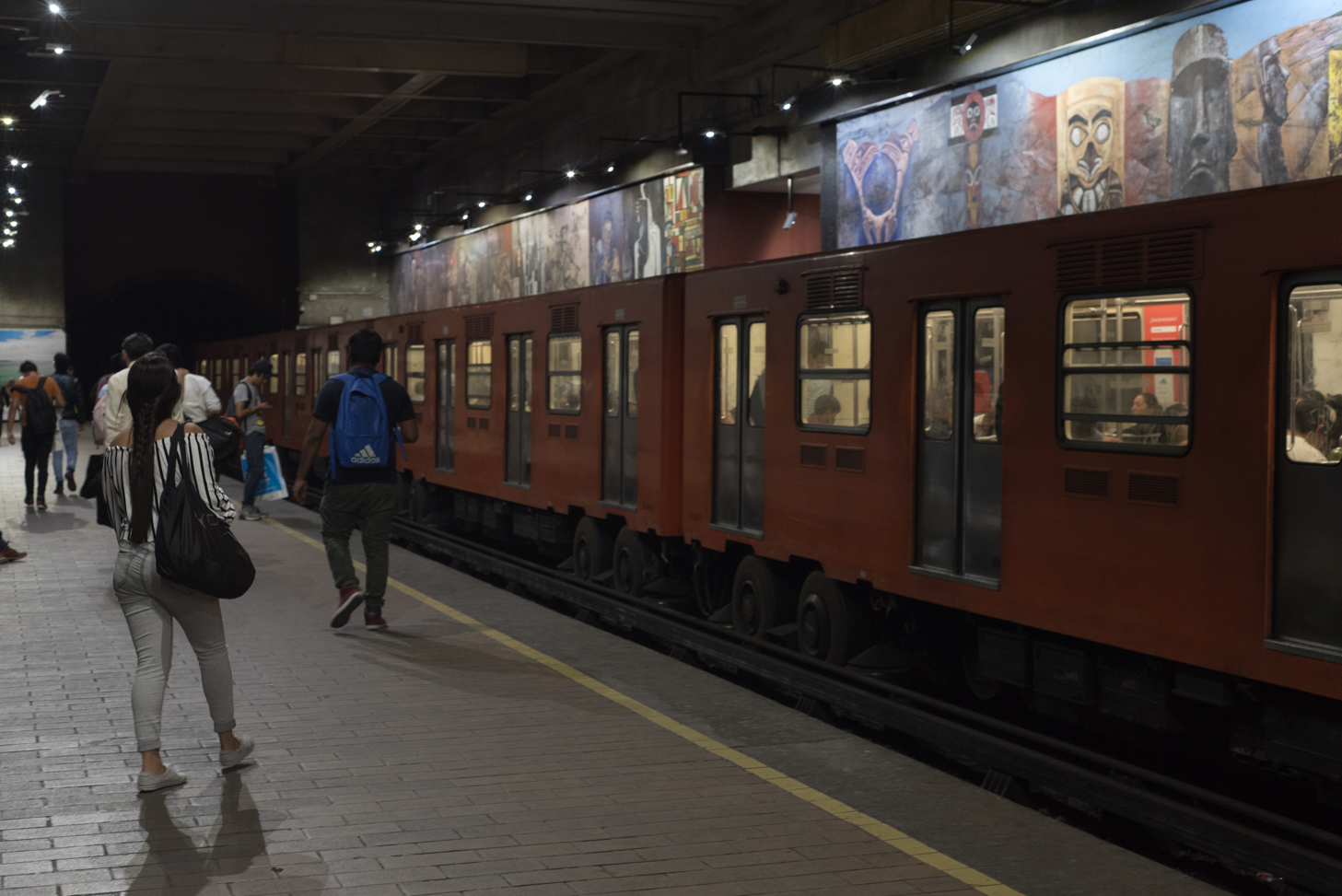
Copilco

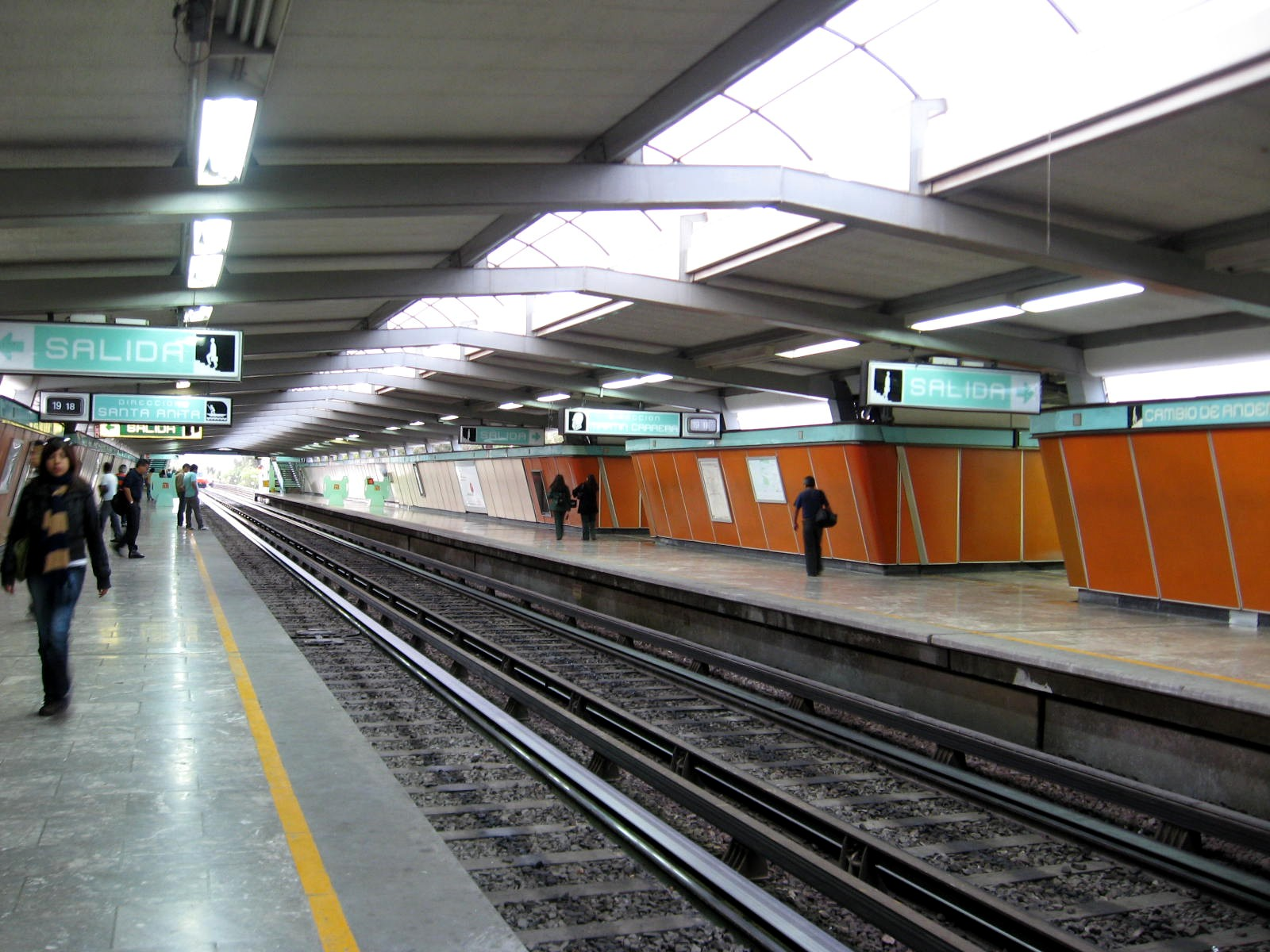
Fray Servando

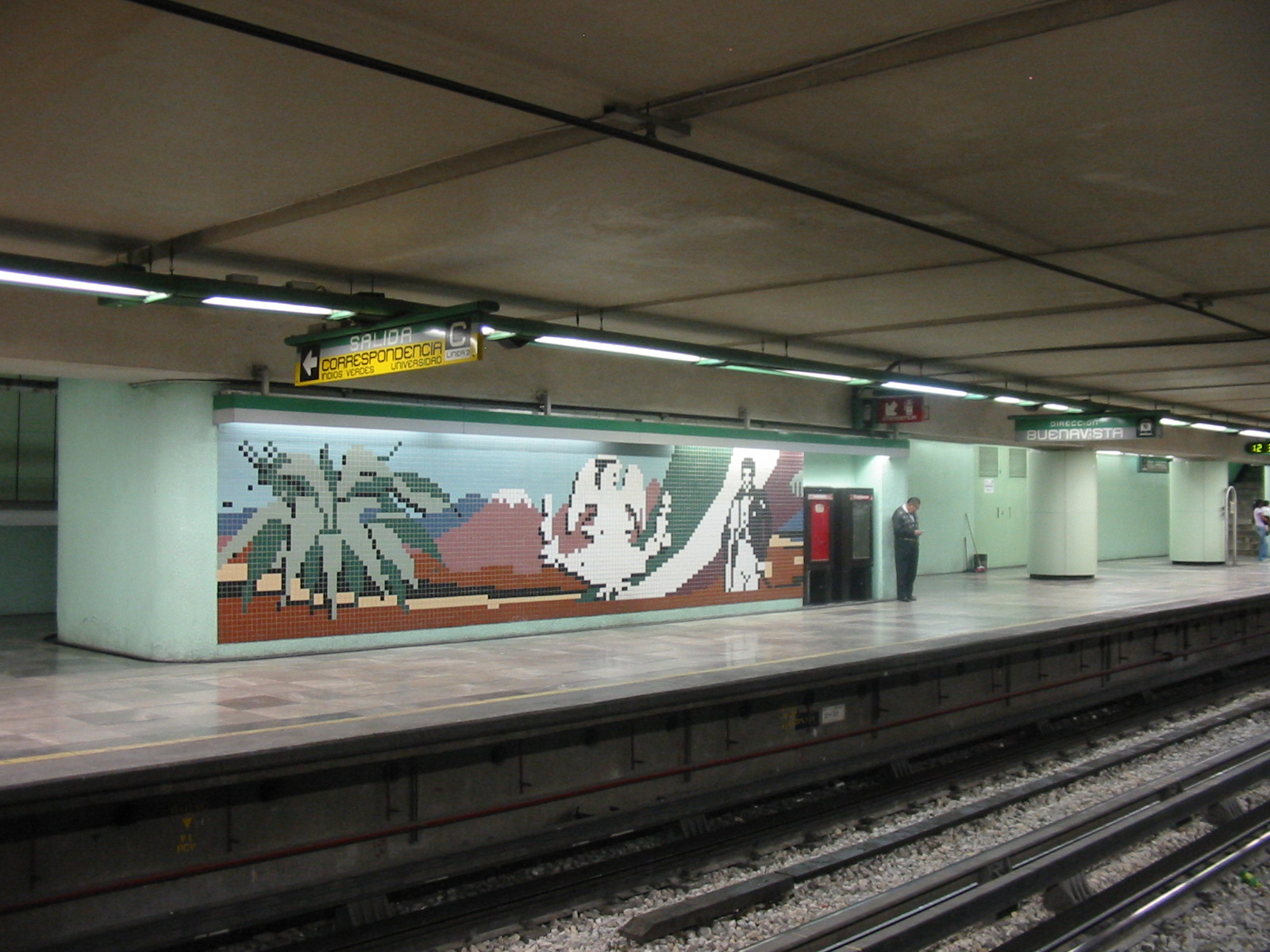
Guerrero, Line B platforms

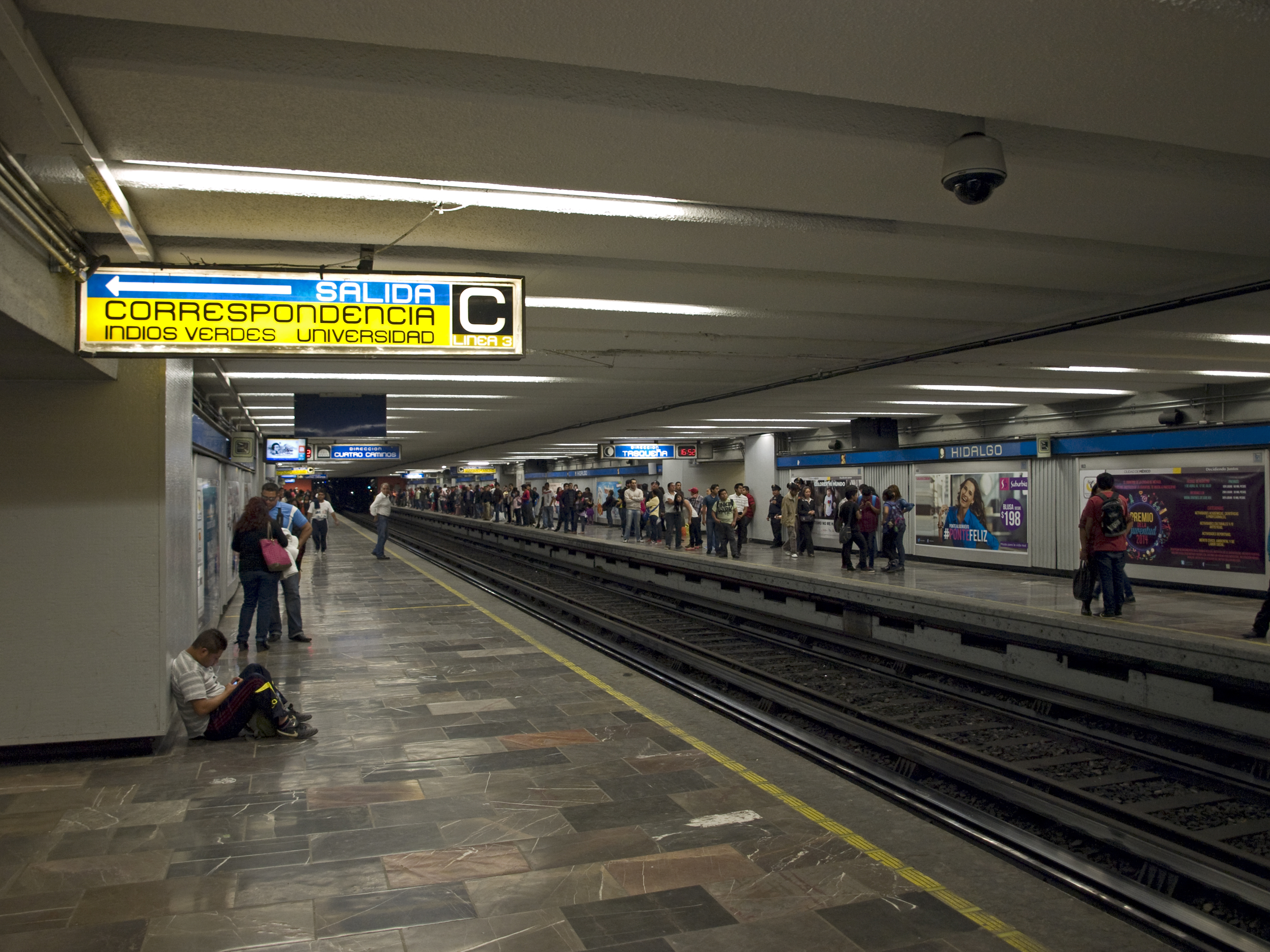
Hidalgo, Line 2 platforms

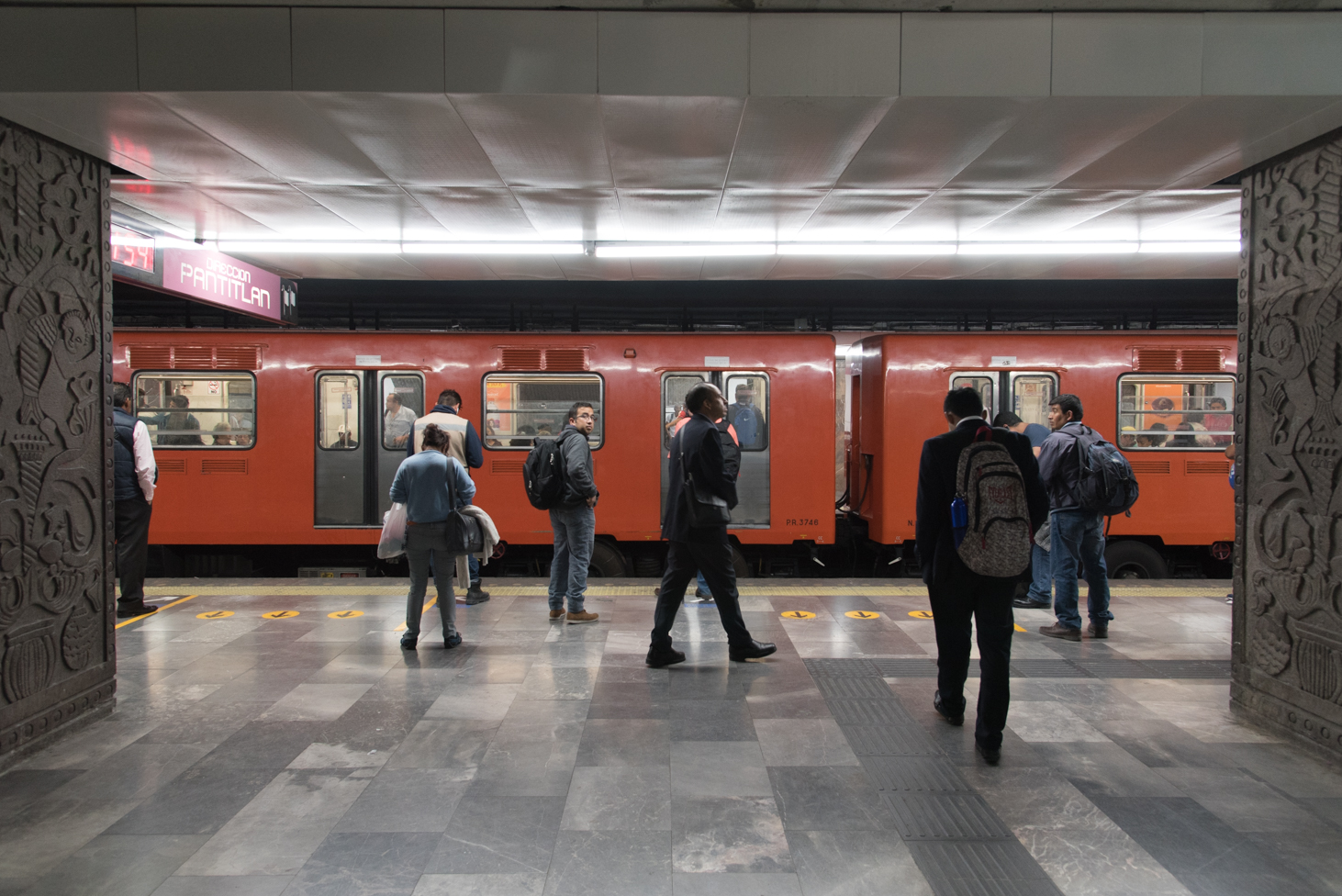
Insurgentes

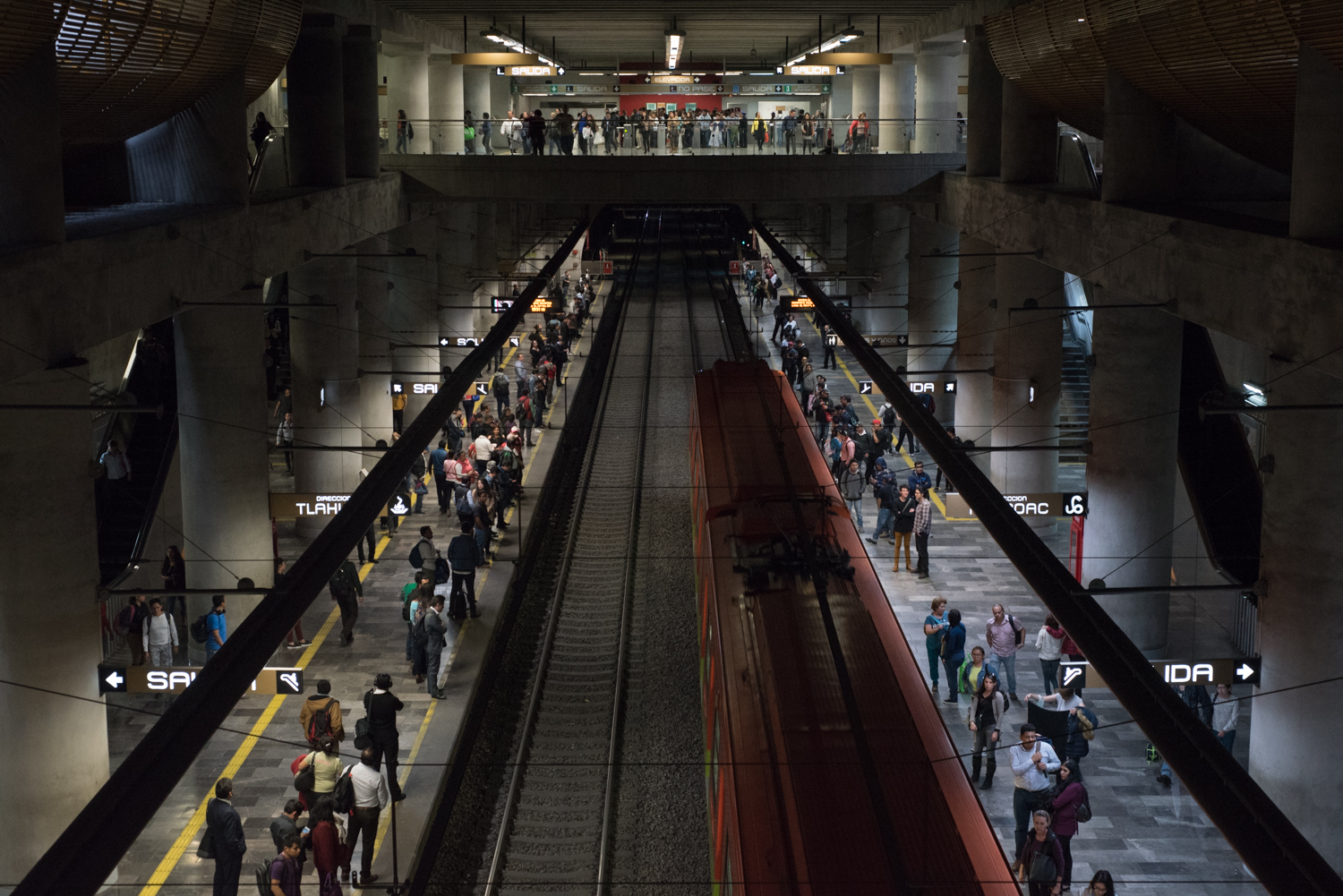
Insurgentes Sur

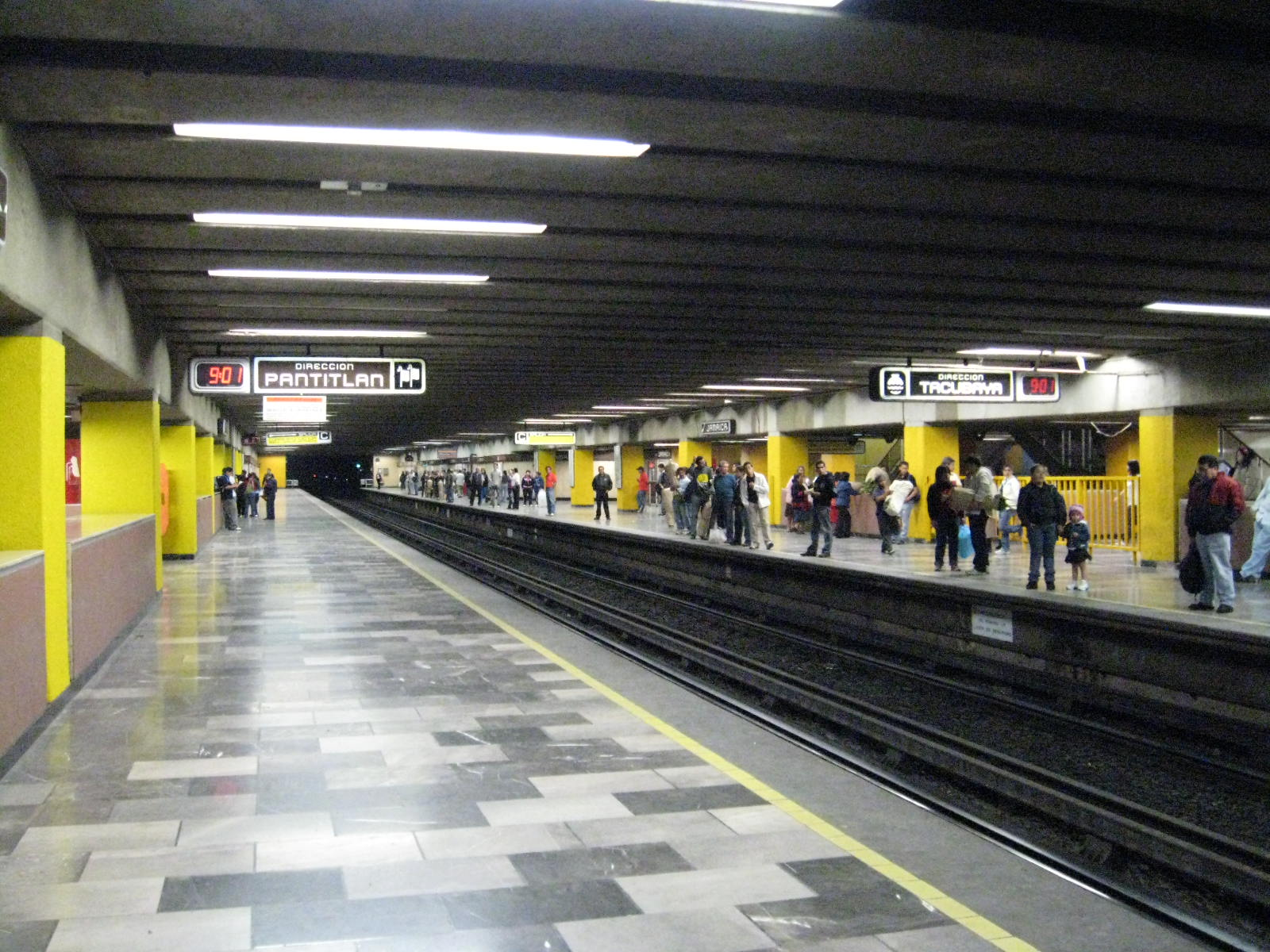
Jamaica

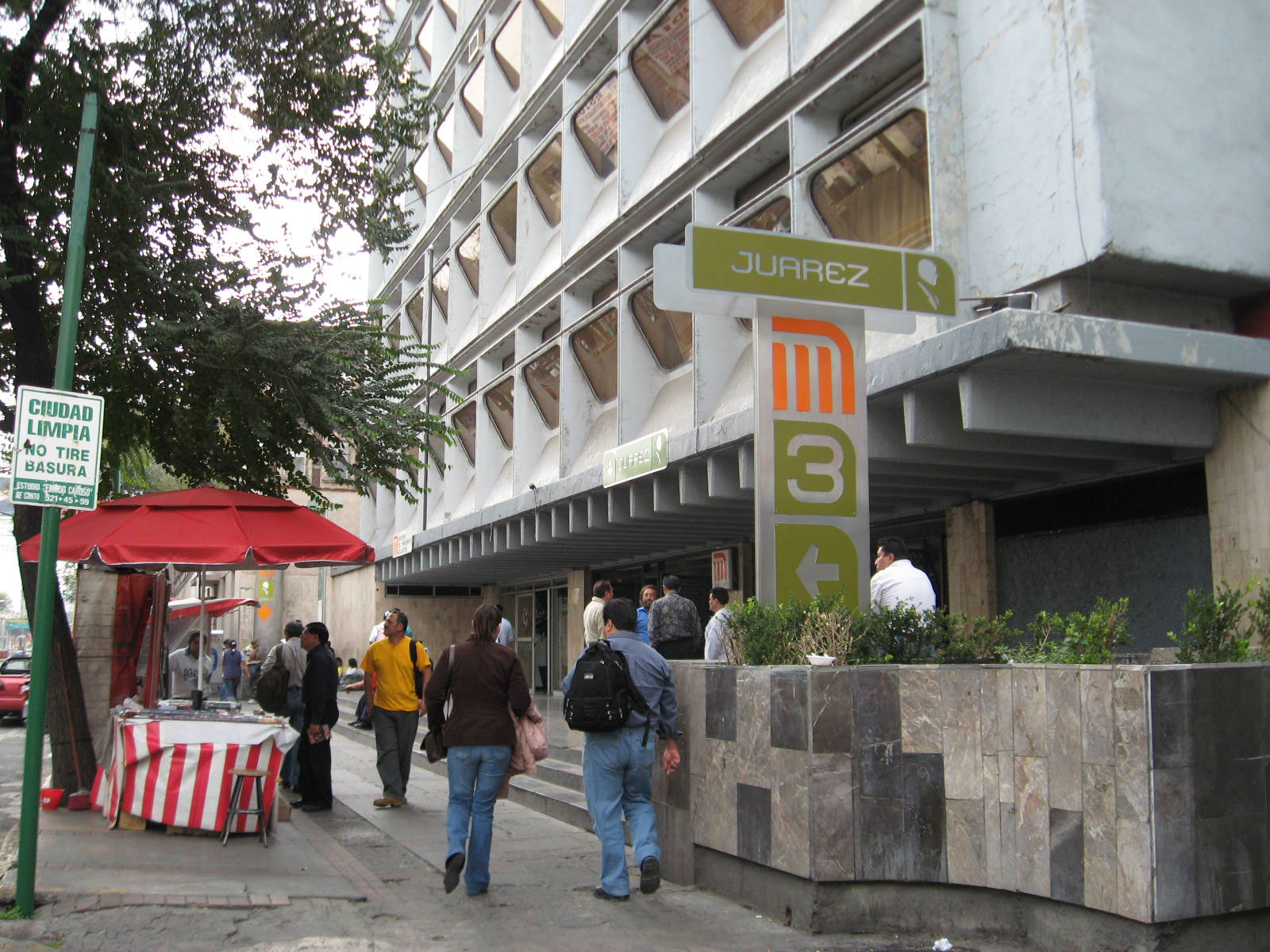
Juárez, entrance to the station

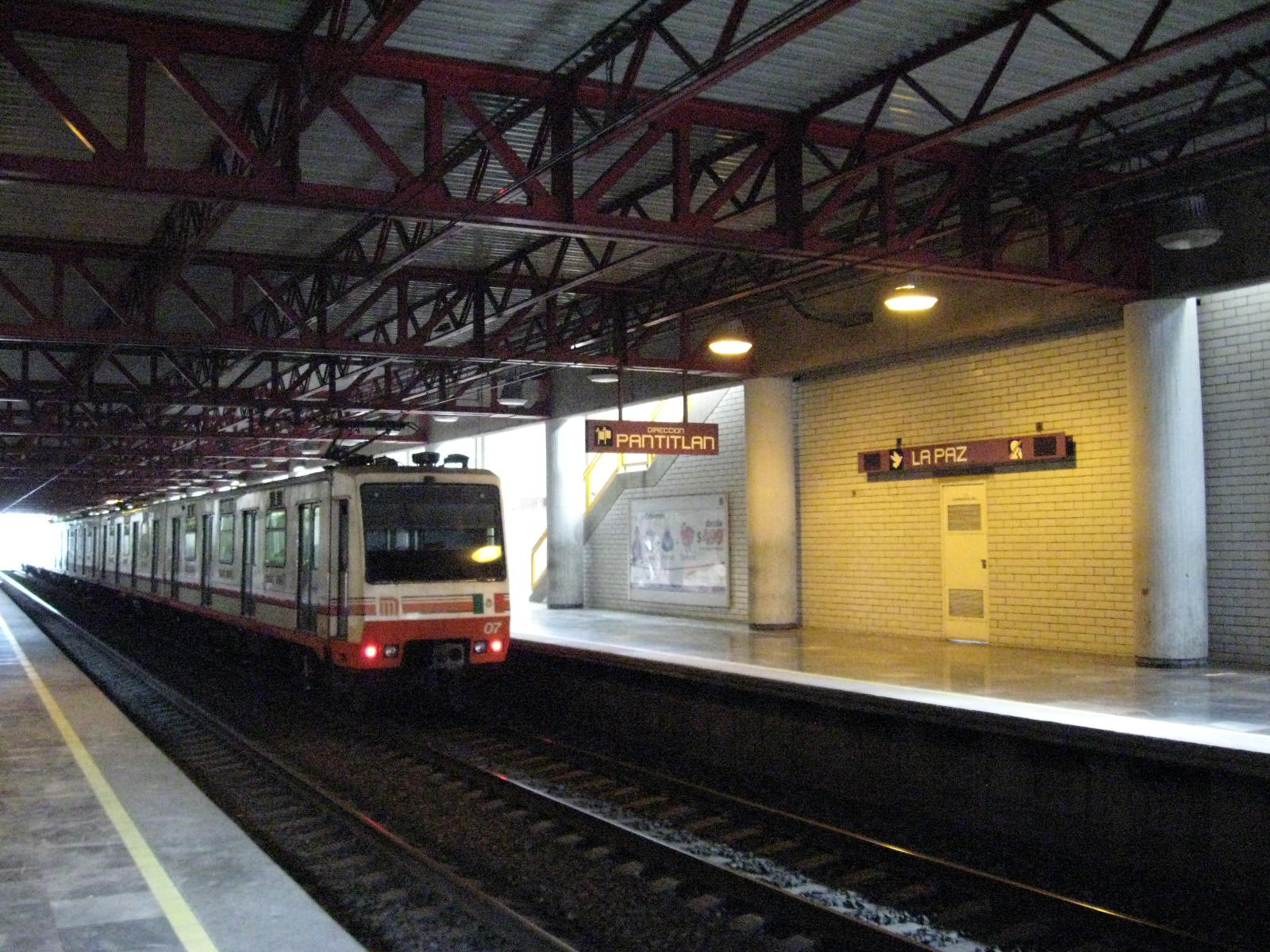
La Paz

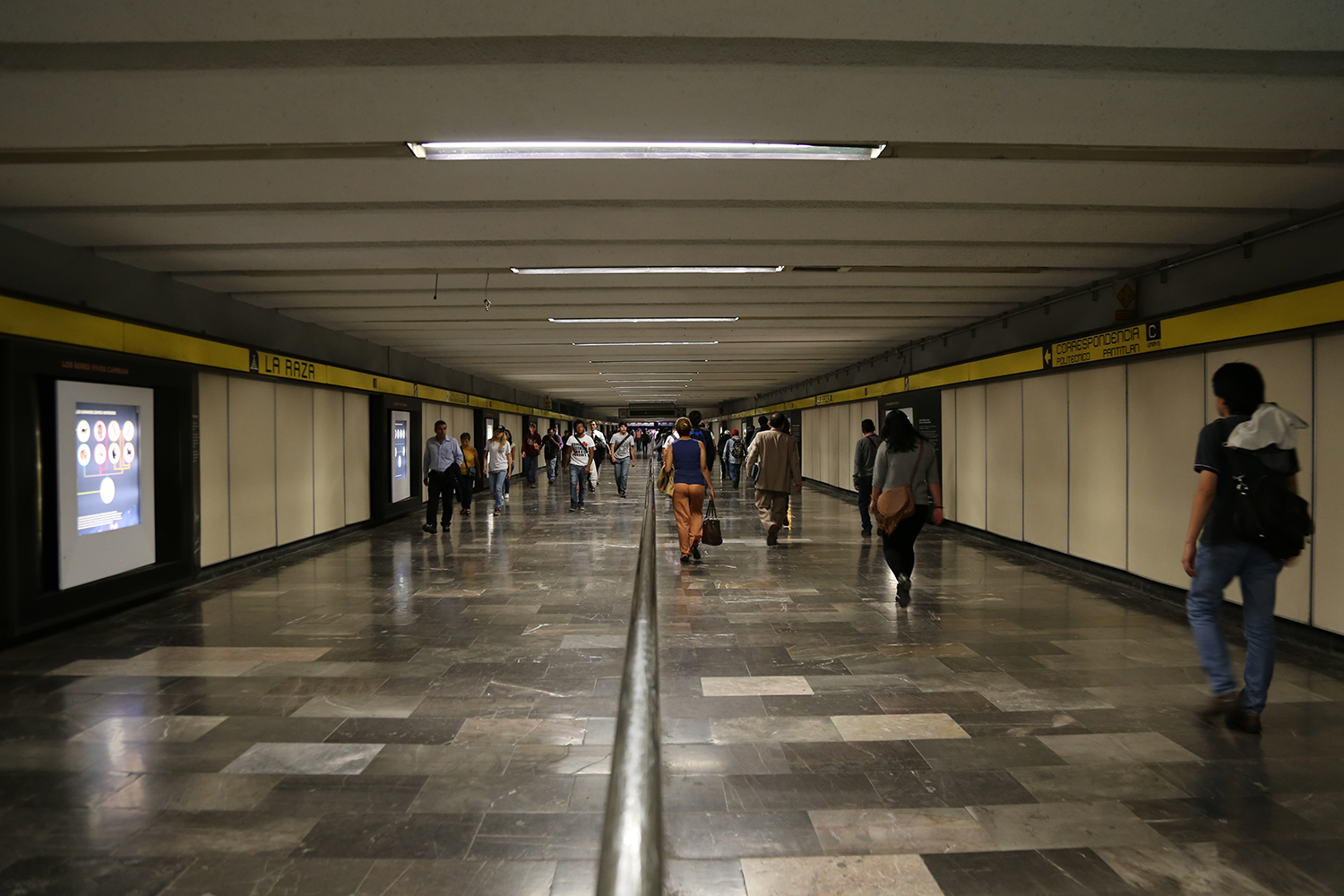
La Raza, transfer tunnel from Line 5 to Line 3

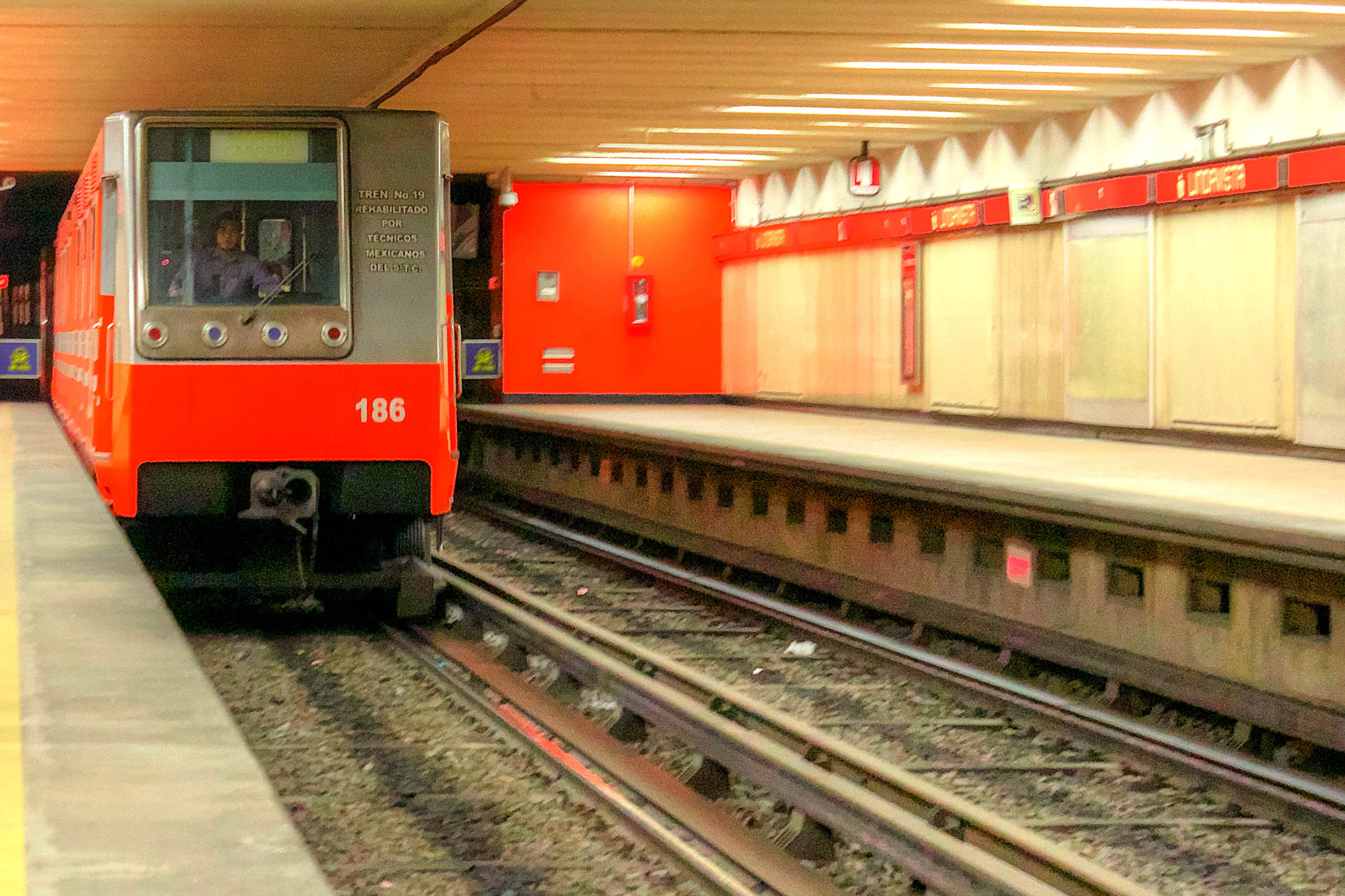
Lindavista

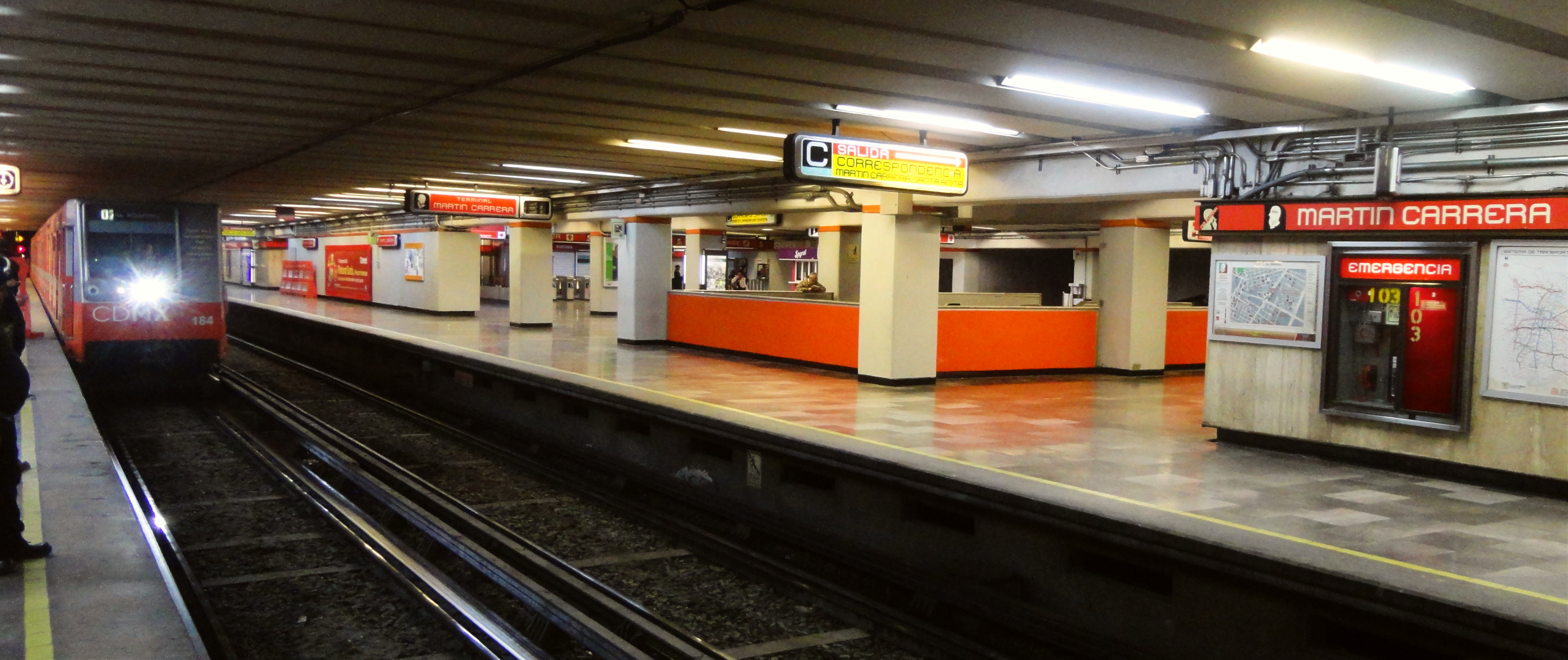
Martín Carrera, Line 6 platforms

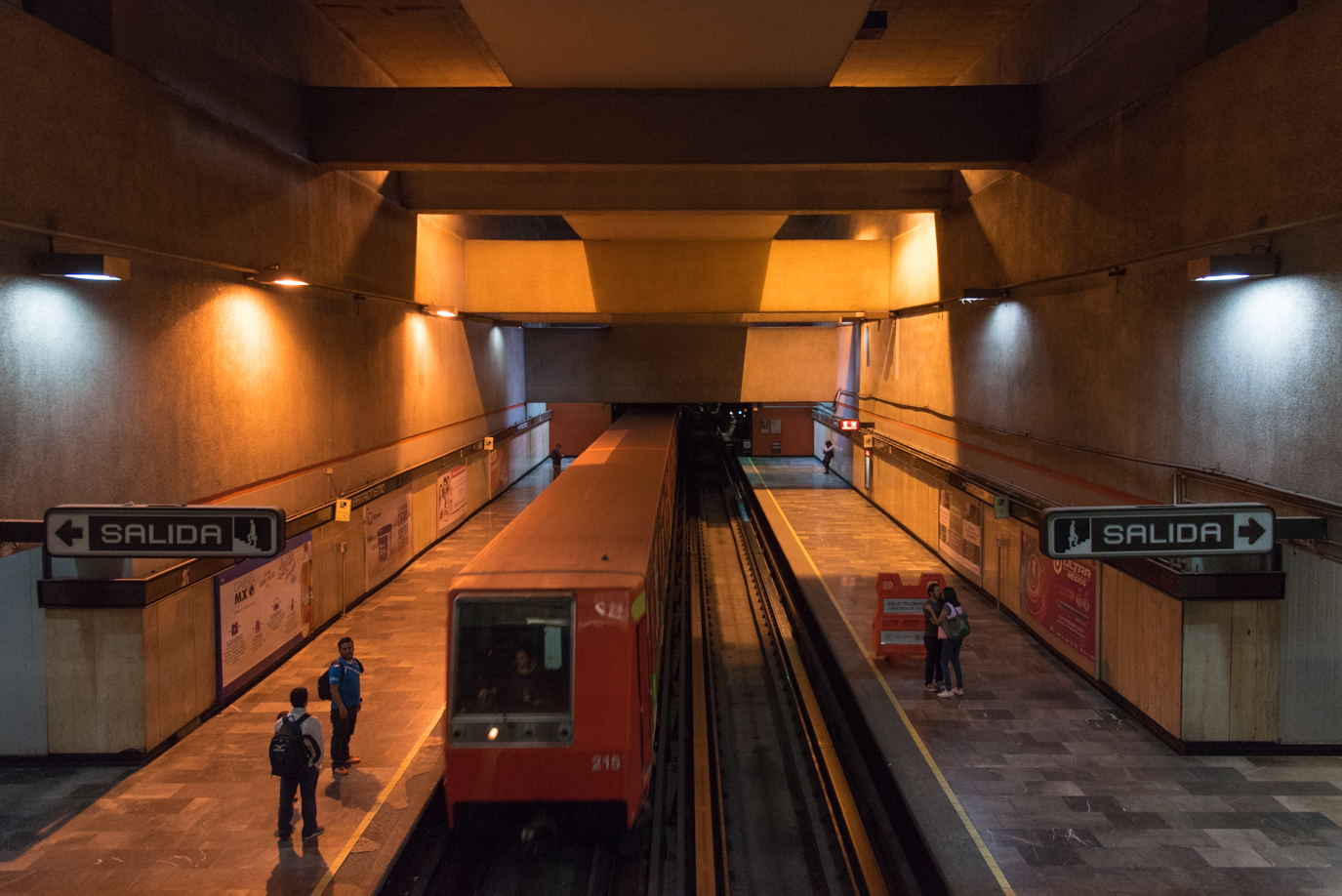
Patriotismo

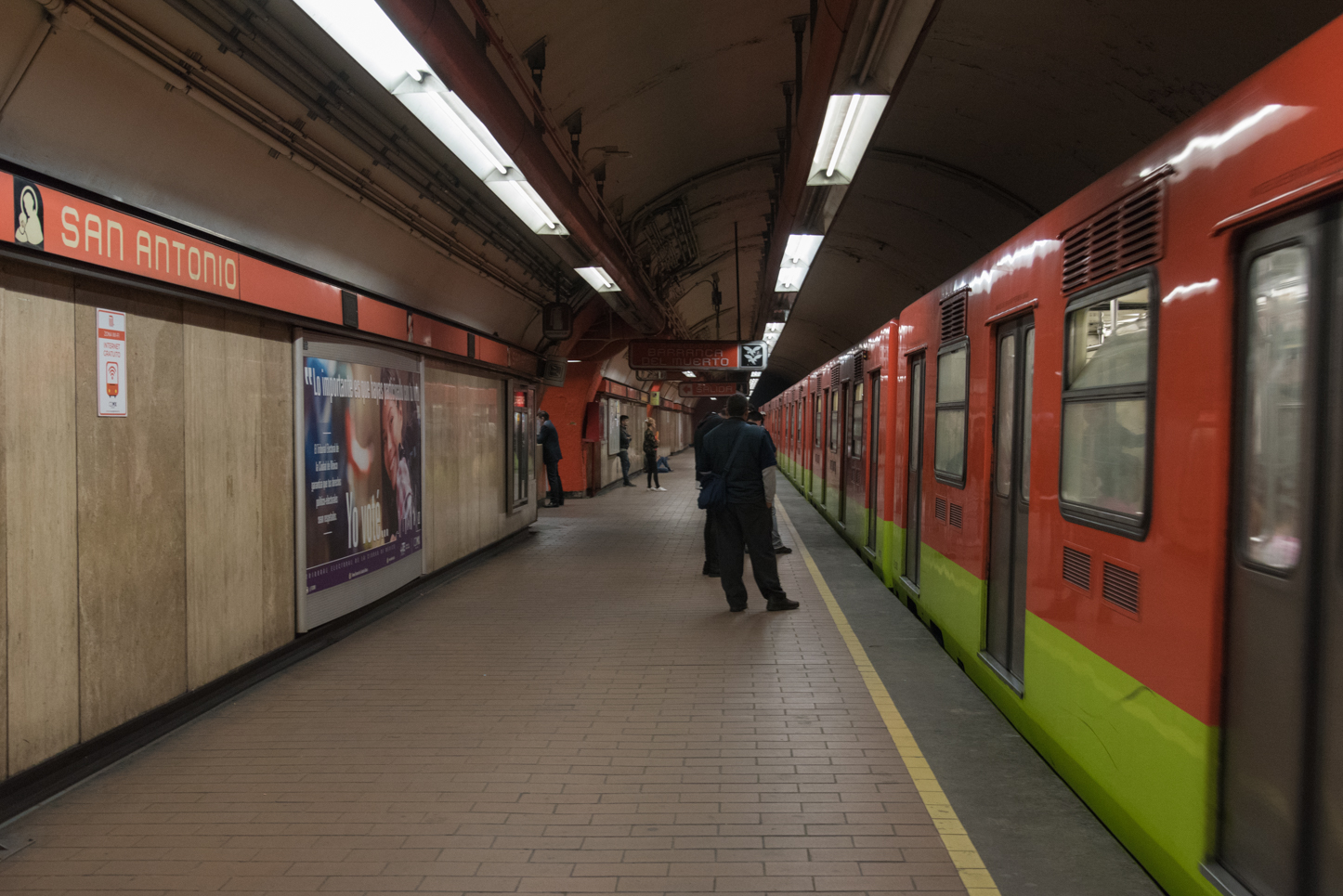
San Antonio

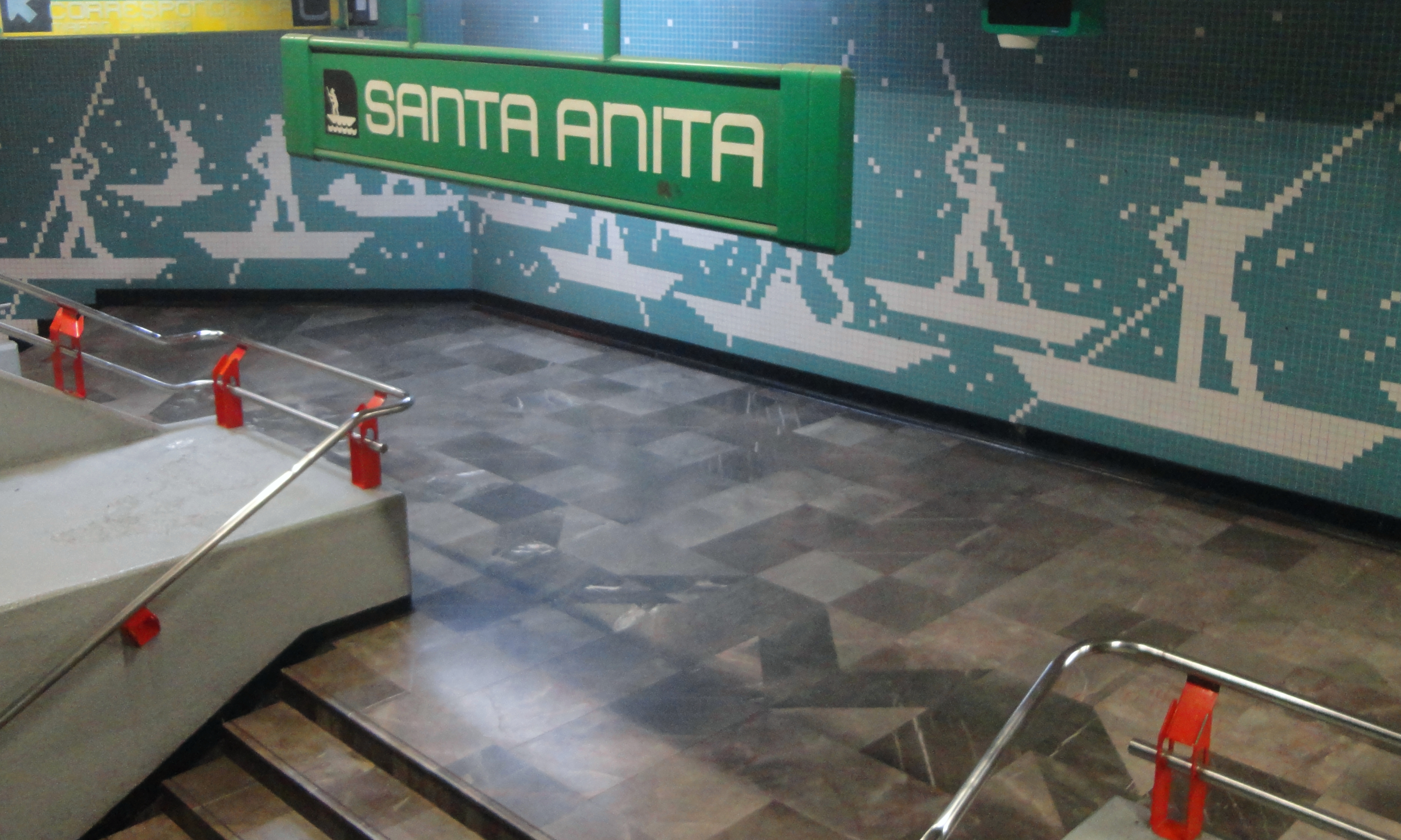
Santa Anita

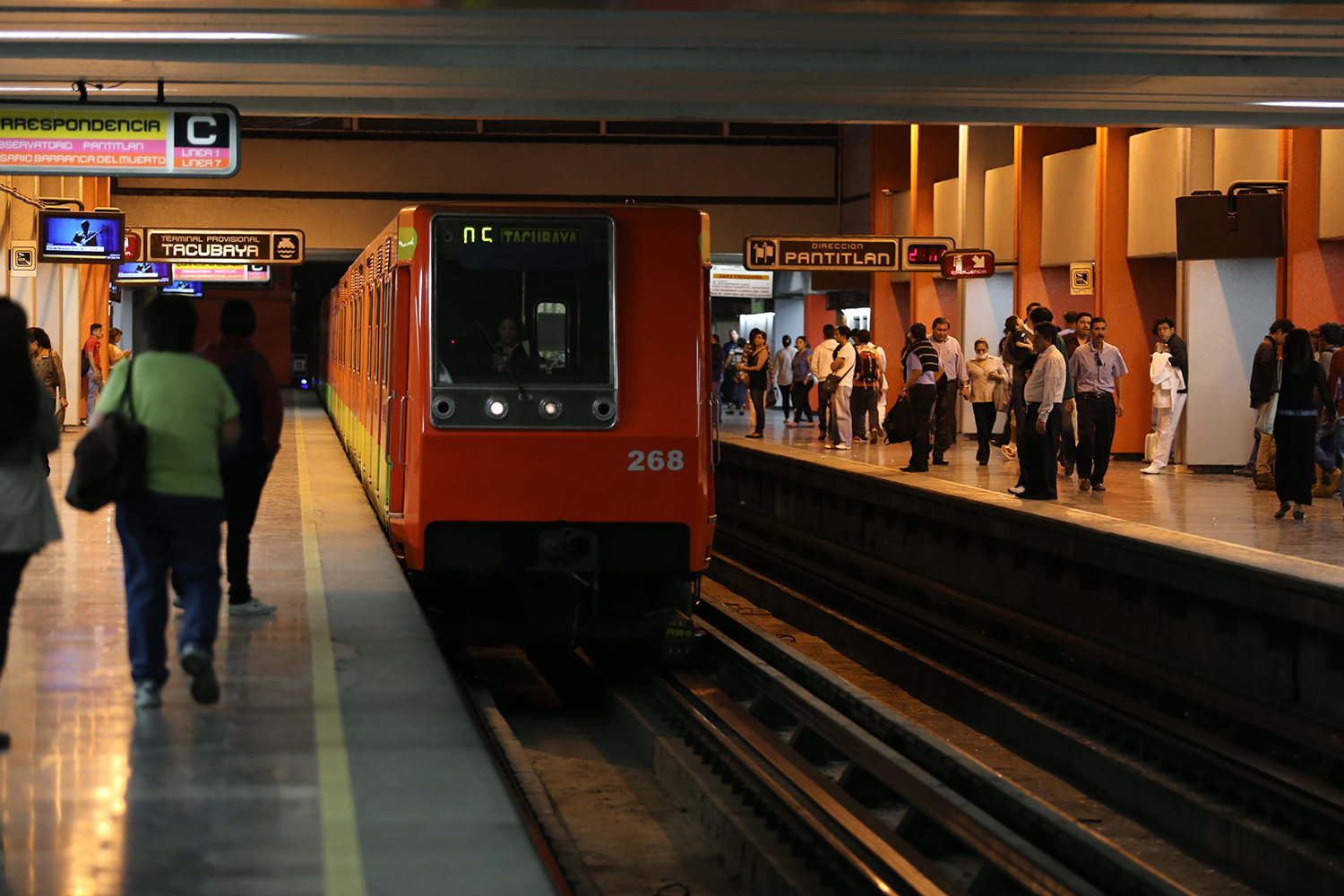
Tacubaya, Line 9 platforms

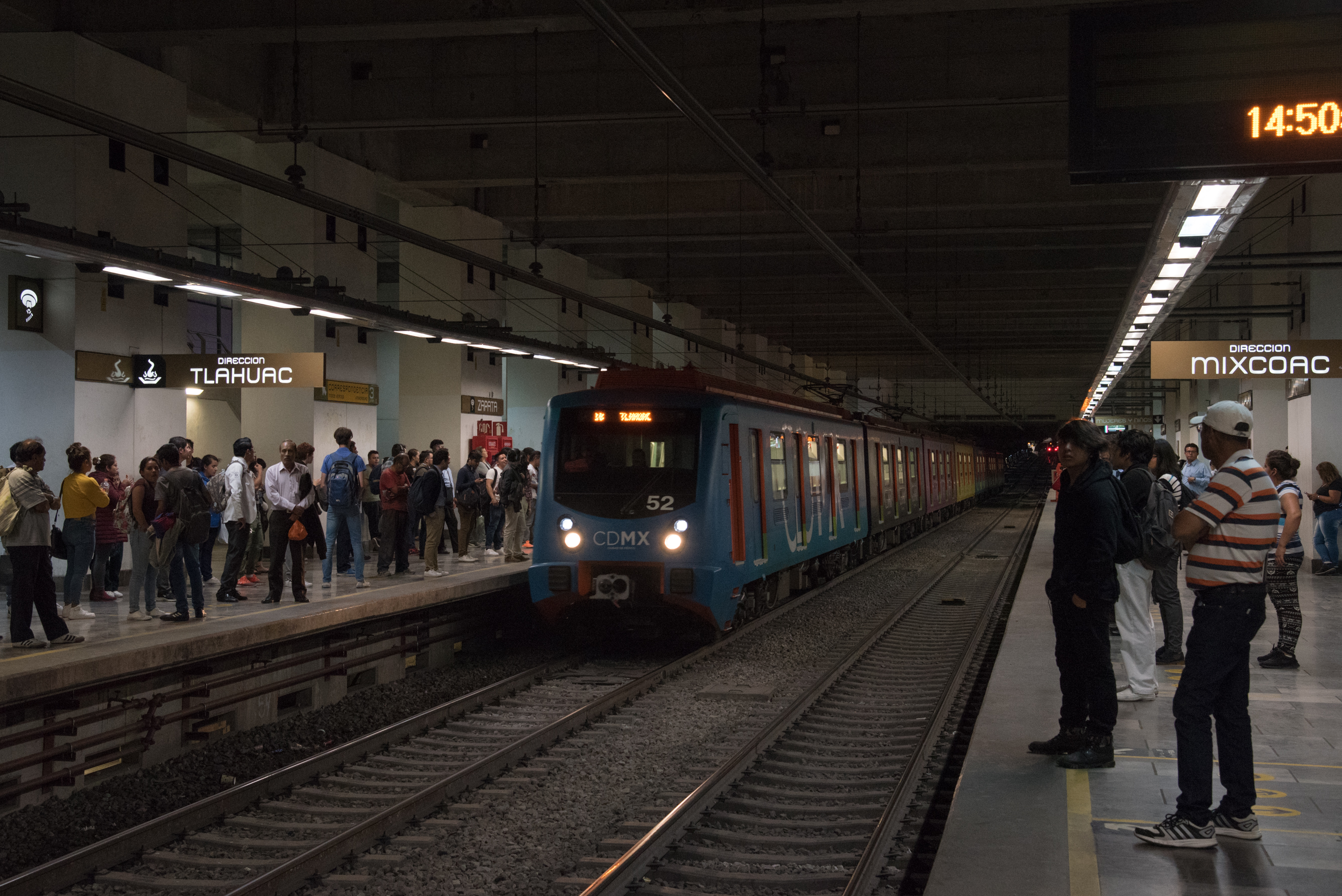
Zapata, Line 12 platforms

| Station | Line(s) | Opened | Grade | Other services | Ref |
|---|---|---|---|---|---|
| Acatitla | Mexico City Metro Line A | 1991 | At-grade | Red de Transporte de Pasajeros | |
| Aculco | Mexico City Metro Line 8 | 1994 | At-grade | Red de Transporte de Pasajeros | |
| Agrícola Oriental | Mexico City Metro Line A | 1991 | At-grade | Red de Transporte de Pasajeros | |
| Allende | Mexico City Metro Line 2 | 1970 | Underground | | |
| Apatlaco | Mexico City Metro Line 8 | 1994 | At-grade | Red de Transporte de Pasajeros | |
| Aquiles Serdán | Mexico City Metro Line 7 | 1988 | Underground | Trolleybus Line 4 Trolleybus Line 6 | |
| Aragón | Mexico City Metro Line 5 | 1981 | At-grade | | |
| Atlalilco† | Mexico City Metro Line 8 Mexico City Metro Line 12 | 1994 | Underground | Red de Transporte de Pasajeros | |
| Auditorio | Mexico City Metro Line 7 | 1984 | Underground | Mexico City Metrobús Line 7 | |
| Autobuses del Norte | Mexico City Metro Line 5 | 1982 | At-grade | Trolleybus Line 1 | |
| Balbuena | Mexico City Metro Line 1 | 1969 | Underground | | |
| Balderas† | Mexico City Metro Line 1 Mexico City Metro Line 3 | 1969 | Underground | Mexico City Metrobús Line 3 | |
| Barranca del Muerto‡ | Mexico City Metro Line 7 | 1985 | Underground | | |
| Bellas Artes† | Mexico City Metro Line 2 Mexico City Metro Line 8 | 1970 | Underground | Mexico City Metrobús Line 4 Trolleybus Line 1 | |
| Bondojito | Mexico City Metro Line 4 | 1981 | Elevated | Trolleybus Line 4 Red de Transporte de Pasajeros | |
| Bosque de Aragón | Mexico City Metro Line B | 1999 | At-grade | | |
| Boulevard Puerto Aéreo | Mexico City Metro Line 1 | 1969 | Underground | Trolleybus Line 4 Red de Transporte de Pasajeros | |
| Buenavista‡ | Mexico City Metro Line B | 1999 | Underground | Mexico City Metrobús Line 1 Mexico City Metrobús Line 3 Mexico City Metrobús Line 4 | |
| Calle 11 | Mexico City Metro Line 12 | 2012 | Elevated | | |
| Camarones | Mexico City Metro Line 7 | 1988 | Underground | Trolleybus Line 4 Trolleybus Line 6 | |
| Canal del Norte | Mexico City Metro Line 4 | 1981 | Elevated | Red de Transporte de Pasajeros | |
| Canal de San Juan | Mexico City Metro Line A | 1991 | At-grade | Mexico City Metrobús Line 2 Red de Transporte de Pasajeros | |
| Candelaria† | Mexico City Metro Line 1 Mexico City Metro Line 4 | 1969 | Underground / At-grade | Red de Transporte de Pasajeros | |
| Centro Médico† | Mexico City Metro Line 3 Mexico City Metro Line 9 | 1980 | Underground | Mexico City Metrobús Line 3 | |
| Cerro de la Estrella | Mexico City Metro Line 8 | 1994 | Underground | Red de Transporte de Pasajeros | |
| Chabacano† | Mexico City Metro Line 2 Mexico City Metro Line 8 Mexico City Metro Line 9 | 1970 | At-grade / Underground | Red de Transporte de Pasajeros | |
| Chapultepec | Mexico City Metro Line 1 | 1969 | Underground | Trolleybus Line 2 Trolleybus Line 6 | |
| Chilpancingo | Mexico City Metro Line 9 | 1988 | Underground | Mexico City Metrobús Line 1 | |
| Ciudad Azteca‡ | Mexico City Metro Line B | 2000 | At-grade | | |
| Ciudad Deportiva | Mexico City Metro Line 9 | 1987 | Elevated | | |
| Colegio Militar | Mexico City Metro Line 2 | 1970 | Underground | | |
| Constitución de 1917‡ | Mexico City Metro Line 8 | 1994 | At-grade | Red de Transporte de Pasajeros | |
| Constituyentes | Mexico City Metro Line 7 | 1985 | Underground | Red de Transporte de Pasajeros | |
| Consulado† | Mexico City Metro Line 4 Mexico City Metro Line 5 | 1981 | Elevated / At-grade | Mexico City Metrobús Line 5 Red de Transporte de Pasajeros | |
| Copilco | Mexico City Metro Line 3 | 1983 | Underground | | |
| Coyoacán | Mexico City Metro Line 3 | 1983 | Underground | | |
| Coyuya | Mexico City Metro Line 8 | 1994 | At-grade | Mexico City Metrobús Line 2 Red de Transporte de Pasajeros | |
| Cuatro Caminos‡ | Mexico City Metro Line 2 | 1984 | Underground | Red de Transporte de Pasajeros | |
| Cuauhtémoc | Mexico City Metro Line 1 | 1969 | Underground | Mexico City Metrobús Line 3 | |
| Cuitláhuac | Mexico City Metro Line 2 | 1970 | Underground | Trolleybus Line 6 | |
| Culhuacán | Mexico City Metro Line 12 | 2012 | Elevated | | |
| Deportivo 18 de Marzo† | Mexico City Metro Line 3 Mexico City Metro Line 6 | 1979 | At-grade / Underground | Mexico City Metrobús Line 1 Mexico City Metrobús Line 6 | |
| Deportivo Oceanía | Mexico City Metro Line B | 1999 | At-grade | Red de Transporte de Pasajeros | |
| División del Norte | Mexico City Metro Line 3 | 1980 | Underground | | |
| Doctores | Mexico City Metro Line 8 | 1994 | Underground | Trolleybus Line 1 | |
| Ecatepec | Mexico City Metro Line B | 2000 | At-grade | | |
| Eduardo Molina | Mexico City Metro Line 5 | 1981 | At-grade | | |
| Eje Central | Mexico City Metro Line 12 | 2012 | Underground | Trolleybus Line 1 | |
| El Rosario†‡ | Mexico City Metro Line 6 Mexico City Metro Line 7 | 1983 | At-grade | Mexico City Metrobús Line 6 Trolleybus Line 4 Trolleybus Line 6 | |
| Ermita† | Mexico City Metro Line 2 Mexico City Metro Line 12 | 1970 | At-grade / Underground | Red de Transporte de Pasajeros | |
| Escuadrón 201 | Mexico City Metro Line 8 | 1994 | Underground | Red de Transporte de Pasajeros | |
| Etiopía / Plaza de la Transparencia | Mexico City Metro Line 3 | 1980 | Underground | Mexico City Metrobús Line 2 Mexico City Metrobús Line 3 | |
| Eugenia | Mexico City Metro Line 3 | 1980 | Underground | | |
| Ferrería/Arena Ciudad de México | Mexico City Metro Line 6 | 1983 | Underground | Tren Suburbano | |
| Fray Servando | Mexico City Metro Line 4 | 1982 | Elevated | Red de Transporte de Pasajeros | |
| Garibaldi / Lagunilla†‡ | Mexico City Metro Line 8 Mexico City Metro Line B | 1994 | Underground | Mexico City Metrobús Line 7 Trolleybus Line 1 Trolleybus Line 5 | |
| General Anaya | Mexico City Metro Line 2 | 1970 | At-grade | Red de Transporte de Pasajeros | |
| Gómez Farías | Mexico City Metro Line 1 | 1969 | Underground | | |
| Guelatao | Mexico City Metro Line A | 1991 | At-grade | Red de Transporte de Pasajeros | |
| Guerrero | Mexico City Metro Line 3 Mexico City Metro Line B | 1970 | Underground | Mexico City Metrobús Line 3 | |
| Hangares | Mexico City Metro Line 5 | 1981 | Underground | Red de Transporte de Pasajeros | |
| Hidalgo† | Mexico City Metro Line 2 Mexico City Metro Line 3 | 1970 | Underground | Mexico City Metrobús Line 3 Mexico City Metrobús Line 4 Mexico City Metrobús Line 7 Trolleybus Line 5 | |
| Hospital 20 de Noviembre | Mexico City Metro Line 12 | 2012 | Underground | | |
| Hospital General | Mexico City Metro Line 3 | 1970 | Underground | Mexico City Metrobús Line 3 Trolleybus Line 2 | |
| Impulsora | Mexico City Metro Line B | 2000 | At-grade | | |
| Indios Verdes‡ | Mexico City Metro Line 3 | 1979 | At-grade | Mexico City Metrobús Line 1 Mexico City Metrobús Line 7 | |
| Instituto del Petróleo† | Mexico City Metro Line 5 Mexico City Metro Line 6 | 1982 | At-grade / Underground | Mexico City Metrobús Line 6 Trolleybus Line 1 | |
| Insurgentes | Mexico City Metro Line 1 | 1969 | Underground | Mexico City Metrobús Line 1 | |
| Insurgentes Sur | Mexico City Metro Line 12 | 2012 | Underground | Mexico City Metrobús Line 1 | |
| Isabel la Católica | Mexico City Metro Line 1 | 1969 | Underground | | |
| Iztacalco | Mexico City Metro Line 8 | 1994 | At-grade | Red de Transporte de Pasajeros | |
| Iztapalapa | Mexico City Metro Line 8 | 1994 | Underground | Red de Transporte de Pasajeros | |
| Jamaica† | Mexico City Metro Line 4 Mexico City Metro Line 9 | 1982 | Elevated / Underground | Red de Transporte de Pasajeros | |
| Juanacatlán | Mexico City Metro Line 1 | 1970 | Underground | | |
| Juárez | Mexico City Metro Line 3 | 1970 | Underground | Mexico City Metrobús Line 3 Red de Transporte de Pasajeros | |
| Lagunilla | Mexico City Metro Line B | 1999 | Underground | | |
| La Paz‡ | Mexico City Metro Line A | 1991 | At-grade | | |
| La Raza† | Mexico City Metro Line 3 Mexico City Metro Line 5 | 1979 | Underground / At-grade | Mexico City Metrobús Line 1 Mexico City Metrobús Line 3 | |
| La Viga | Mexico City Metro Line 8 | 1994 | Underground | Mexico City Metrobús Line 2 | |
| La Villa-Basílica | Mexico City Metro Line 6 | 1986 | Underground | Mexico City Metrobús Line 6 Trolleybus Line 5 | |
| Lázaro Cárdenas | Mexico City Metro Line 9 | 1987 | Underground | Trolleybus Line 1 | |
| Lindavista | Mexico City Metro Line 6 | 1986 | Underground | | |
| Lomas Estrella | Mexico City Metro Line 12 | 2012 | Elevated | Trolleybus Line 7 | |
| Los Reyes | Mexico City Metro Line A | 1991 | At-grade | | |
| Martín Carrera†‡ | Mexico City Metro Line 4 Mexico City Metro Line 6 | 1981 | At-grade / Underground | Mexico City Metrobús Line 6 Trolleybus Line 5 Red de Transporte de Pasajeros | |
| Merced | Mexico City Metro Line 1 | 1969 | Underground | Mexico City Metrobús Line 4 | |
| Mexicaltzingo | Mexico City Metro Line 12 | 2012 | Underground | | |
| Miguel Ángel de Quevedo | Mexico City Metro Line 3 | 1983 | Underground | Trolleybus Line 7 Red de Transporte de Pasajeros | |
| Misterios | Mexico City Metro Line 5 | 1982 | Underground | Mexico City Metrobús Line 7 | |
| Mixcoac†‡ | Mexico City Metro Line 7 Mexico City Metro Line 12 | 1985 | Underground | Trolleybus Line 3 Red de Transporte de Pasajeros | |
| Mixiuhca | Mexico City Metro Line 9 | 1987 | Underground | Red de Transporte de Pasajeros | |
| Moctezuma | Mexico City Metro Line 1 | 1969 | Underground | Mexico City Metrobús Line 4 Red de Transporte de Pasajeros | |
| Morelos† | Mexico City Metro Line 4 Mexico City Metro Line B | 1981 | Elevated / Underground | Mexico City Metrobús Line 4 Red de Transporte de Pasajeros | |
| Múzquiz | Mexico City Metro Line B | 2000 | At-grade | | |
| Nativitas | Mexico City Metro Line 2 | 1970 | At-grade | Red de Transporte de Pasajeros | |
| Nezahualcóyotl | Mexico City Metro Line B | 2000 | At-grade | | |
| Niños Héroes / Poder Judicial CDMX | Mexico City Metro Line 3 | 1970 | Underground | | |
| Nopalera | Mexico City Metro Line 12 | 2012 | Elevated | | |
| Normal | Mexico City Metro Line 2 | 1970 | Underground | | |
| Norte 45 | Mexico City Metro Line 6 | 1983 | Underground | Mexico City Metrobús Line 6 | |
| Obrera | Mexico City Metro Line 8 | 1994 | Underground | Trolleybus Line 1 Trolleybus Line 2 | |
| Observatorio‡ | Mexico City Metro Line 1 | 1972 | Underground | Central de Autobuses Poniente | |
| Oceanía† | Mexico City Metro Line 5 Mexico City Metro Line B | 1981 | At-grade / Elevated | Trolleybus Line 4 Red de Transporte de Pasajeros | |
| Olímpica | Mexico City Metro Line B | 2000 | At-grade | | |
| Olivos | Mexico City Metro Line 12 | 2012 | Elevated | | |
| Panteones | Mexico City Metro Line 2 | 1984 | Underground | | |
| Pantitlán†‡ | Mexico City Metro Line 1 Mexico City Metro Line 5 Mexico City Metro Line 9 Mexico City Metro Line A | 1981 | Underground / At-grade / Elevated | Red de Transporte de Pasajeros | |
| Parque de los Venados | Mexico City Metro Line 12 | 2012 | Underground | | |
| Patriotismo | Mexico City Metro Line 9 | 1988 | Underground | Mexico City Metrobús Line 2 | |
| Peñón Viejo | Mexico City Metro Line A | 1991 | At-grade | Red de Transporte de Pasajeros | |
| Periférico Oriente | Mexico City Metro Line 12 | 2012 | Elevated | | |
| Pino Suárez† | Mexico City Metro Line 1 Mexico City Metro Line 2 | 1969 | Underground | Mexico City Metrobús Line 4 | |
| Plaza Aragón | Mexico City Metro Line B | 2000 | At-grade | | |
| Polanco | Mexico City Metro Line 7 | 1984 | Underground | | |
| Politécnico‡ | Mexico City Metro Line 5 | 1982 | At-grade | Trolleybus Line 8 | |
| Popotla | Mexico City Metro Line 2 | 1970 | Underground | | |
| Portales | Mexico City Metro Line 2 | 1970 | At-grade | Trolleybus Line 3 Red de Transporte de Pasajeros | |
| Potrero | Mexico City Metro Line 3 | 1979 | At-grade | Mexico City Metrobús Line 1 | |
| Puebla | Mexico City Metro Line 9 | 1987 | Elevated | | |
| Refinería | Mexico City Metro Line 7 | 1988 | Underground | | |
| Revolución | Mexico City Metro Line 2 | 1970 | Underground | Mexico City Metrobús Line 1 Mexico City Metrobús Line 4 | |
| Ricardo Flores Magón | Mexico City Metro Line B | 1999 | Elevated | | |
| Río de los Remedios | Mexico City Metro Line B | 2000 | At-grade | | |
| Romero Rubio | Mexico City Metro Line B | 1999 | Elevated | | |
| Salto del Agua† | Mexico City Metro Line 1 Mexico City Metro Line 8 | 1969 | Underground | Trolleybus Line 1 | |
| San Andrés Tomatlán | Mexico City Metro Line 12 | 2012 | Elevated | | |
| San Antonio | Mexico City Metro Line 7 | 1985 | Underground | | |
| San Antonio Abad | Mexico City Metro Line 2 | 1970 | At-grade | Red de Transporte de Pasajeros | |
| San Cosme | Mexico City Metro Line 2 | 1970 | Underground | | |
| San Joaquín | Mexico City Metro Line 7 | 1984 | Underground | | |
| San Juan de Letrán | Mexico City Metro Line 8 | 1994 | Underground | Mexico City Metrobús Line 4 Trolleybus Line 1 | |
| San Lázaro† | Mexico City Metro Line 1 Mexico City Metro Line B | 1969 | Underground / Elevated | Mexico City Metrobús Line 4 Mexico City Metrobús Line 5 Red de Transporte de Pasajeros | |
| San Pedro de los Pinos | Mexico City Metro Line 7 | 1985 | Underground | | |
| Santa Anita†‡ | Mexico City Metro Line 4 Mexico City Metro Line 8 | 1982 | Elevated / Underground | Red de Transporte de Pasajeros | |
| Santa Marta | Mexico City Metro Line A | 1991 | At-grade | Red de Transporte de Pasajeros | |
| Sevilla | Mexico City Metro Line 1 | 1969 | Underground | | |
| Tacuba† | Mexico City Metro Line 2 Mexico City Metro Line 7 | 1970 | Underground | | |
| Tacubaya†‡ | Mexico City Metro Line 1 Mexico City Metro Line 7 Mexico City Metro Line 9 | 1970 | Underground | Mexico City Metrobús Line 2 | |
| Talismán | Mexico City Metro Line 4 | 1981 | Elevated | Red de Transporte de Pasajeros | |
| Tasqueña‡ | Mexico City Metro Line 2 | 1970 | At-grade | Mexico City Light Rail Trolleybus Line 1 Trolleybus Line 7 Red de Transporte de Pasajeros | |
| Tepalcates | Mexico City Metro Line A | 1991 | At-grade | Mexico City Metrobús Line 2 Red de Transporte de Pasajeros | |
| Tepito | Mexico City Metro Line B | 1999 | Underground | | |
| Terminal Aérea | Mexico City Metro Line 5 | 1981 | Underground | Trolleybus Line 4 Red de Transporte de Pasajeros | |
| Tezonco | Mexico City Metro Line 12 | 2012 | Elevated | | |
| Tezozómoc | Mexico City Metro Line 6 | 1983 | Underground | | |
| Tláhuac‡ | Mexico City Metro Line 12 | 2012 | At-grade | | |
| Tlaltenco | Mexico City Metro Line 12 | 2012 | At-grade | | |
| Tlatelolco | Mexico City Metro Line 3 | 1970 | Underground | Mexico City Metrobús Line 3 | |
| UAM-Azcapotzalco | Mexico City Metro Line 6 | 1983 | Underground | | |
| UAM-I | Mexico City Metro Line 8 | 1994 | Underground | Red de Transporte de Pasajeros | |
| Universidad‡ | Mexico City Metro Line 3 | 1983 | At-grade | Red de Transporte de Pasajeros | |
| Valle Gómez | Mexico City Metro Line 5 | 1982 | Underground | | |
| Vallejo | Mexico City Metro Line 6 | 1983 | Underground | | |
| Velódromo | Mexico City Metro Line 9 | 1987 | Elevated | Trolleybus Line 2 | |
| Viaducto | Mexico City Metro Line 2 | 1970 | At-grade | Red de Transporte de Pasajeros | |
| Villa de Aragón | Mexico City Metro Line B | 1999 | At-grade | Mexico City Metrobús Line 6 | |
| Villa de Cortés | Mexico City Metro Line 2 | 1970 | At-grade | Red de Transporte de Pasajeros | |
| Viveros / Derechos Humanos | Mexico City Metro Line 3 | 1983 | Underground | | |
| Xola | Mexico City Metro Line 2 | 1970 | At-grade | Mexico City Metrobús Line 2 Red de Transporte de Pasajeros | |
| Zapata† | Mexico City Metro Line 3 Mexico City Metro Line 12 | 1980 | Underground | Trolleybus Line 3 Red de Transporte de Pasajeros | |
| Zapotitlán | Mexico City Metro Line 12 | 2012 | Elevated | | |
| Zaragoza | Mexico City Metro Line 1 | 1969 | Underground | Red de Transporte de Pasajeros | |
| Zócalo/Tenochtitlan | Mexico City Metro Line 2 | 1970 | Underground | | |

== Future stations ==
As of May 2024, an expansion of Line 12 that will connect Mixcoac to Observatorio is under construction. Two stations, Álvaro Obregón and Valentín Campa, are planned. They were projected to open in 2022.

| Station | Line(s) | Grade | Status | Expected opening | Ref |
|---|---|---|---|---|---|
| Álvaro Obregón | Mexico City Metro Line 12 | Underground | Under construction | 2028 | |
| Valentín Campa | Mexico City Metro Line 12 | Underground | Under construction | 2028 | |

== See also ==
- List of Mexico City Metro lines
