= Portales metro station =

Mexico City metro station

Portales
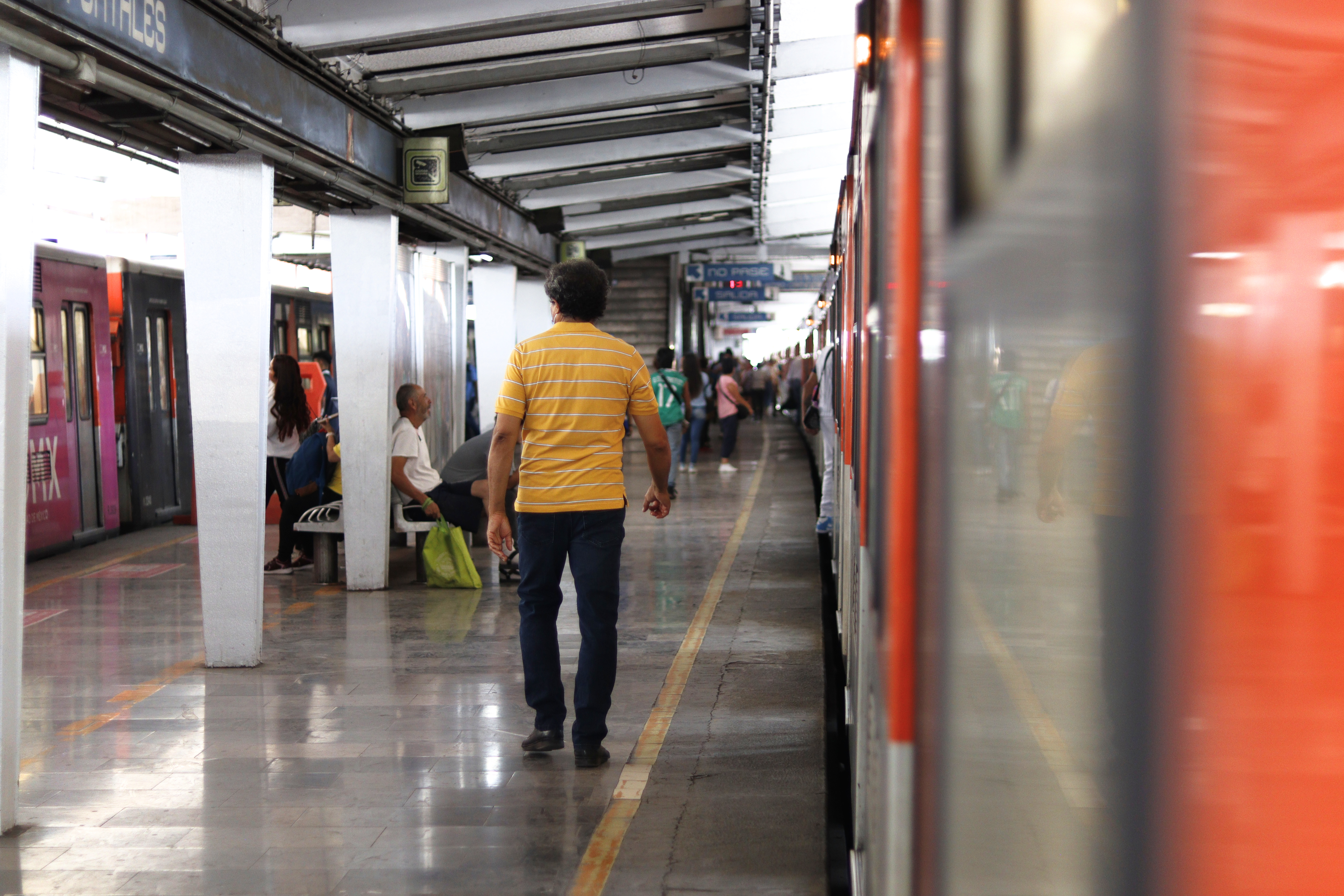
- Metro station Portales

General information
- Location: Calzada de Tlalpan; Benito Juárez; Mexico City; Mexico
- Coordinates: 19°22′11″N 99°08′30″W
- System: Mexico City Metro
- Platforms: 1 island platform
- Tracks: 2

Construction
- Structure type: At grade
- Platform levels: 1
- Parking: No
- Cycle facilities: No
- Accessible: Yes

Other information
- Status: In service

History
- Opened: 1 August 1970; 56 years ago

Passengers
- 2025: 6,302,803 (Note: The data here is limited to the most recent ten years to avoid excessive listings; earlier figures can be found in this page's history or on the Mexico City Metro website. To calculate the average daily ridership, the annual total is divided by 365 days (366 in leap years), with decimals omitted from the result. Each station per line is ranked individually, as the system counts transfer stations separately. The percentage change is calculated automatically using the data from the current year and the previous year.) ▲3.21%
- Rank: 69/195

Services
Preceding station	Mexico City Metro	Following station
Nativitas toward Cuatro Caminos	Line 2	Ermita toward Tasqueña
Route map
Location
- Location within Mexico City
- Area map

Portales is a station on Line 2 of the Mexico City Metro system. It is located in the Colonia Albert and Colonia Portales neighborhoods of the Benito Juárez borough of Mexico City, directly south of the city centre in the median of Calzada de Tlalpan. It is a surface station.

== General information ==
The station logo depicts an architectural portal. In the early 20th century there were many ranches in the surrounding zone, which were later divided up by Emiliano Zapata as part of his land redistribution plans. The area later became famous for the manufacture of bricks for the construction area. The station opened on 1 August 1970.

Portales provides a transfer to trolleybus Line "D", which runs between Metro Mixcoac and the San Andrés Tetepilco neighbourhood.

=== Ridership ===
Annual passenger ridership
Year	Ridership	Average daily	Rank	% change	Ref.
2025	6,302,803	17,267	69/195	+3.21%
2024	6,106,836	16,685	71/195	−1.45%
2023	6,196,514	16,976	72/195	+12.00%
2022	5,532,672	15,158	74/195	+49.87%
2021	3,691,622	10,114	82/195	−22.40%
2020	4,757,544	12,998	64/195	−41.99%
2019	8,201,726	22,470	72/195	−5.27%
2018	8,658,198	23,721	63/195	+7.20%
2017	8,076,454	22,127	72/195	−0.18%
2016	8,090,763	22,105	80/195	+3.00%

== Exits ==
- East: Calzada de Tlalpan between Av. Victor Hugo and Hamburgo street, Colonia Albert
- West: Calzada de Tlalpan between Av. Victor Hugo and Calzada Santa Cruz, Colonia Portales

== See also ==
- List of Mexico City metro stations
