= Periférico Oriente metro station =

Mexico City metro station

Periférico Oriente
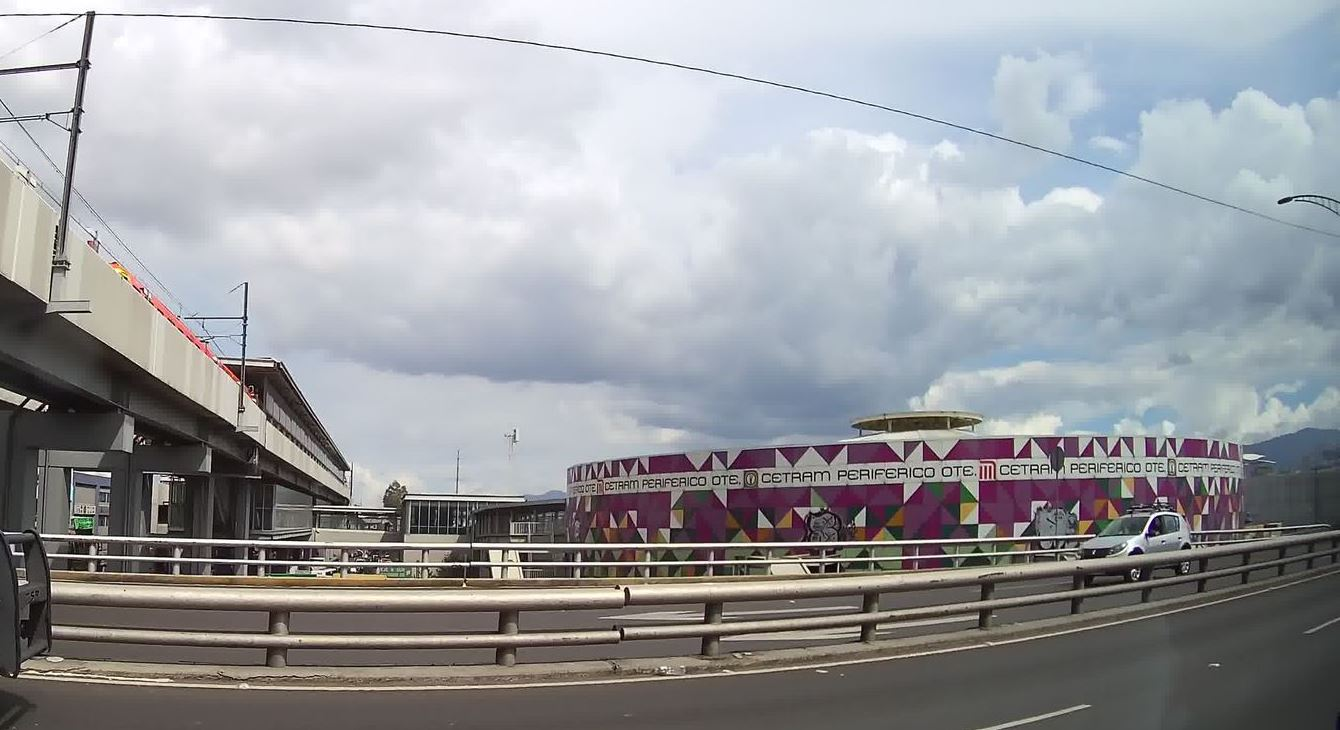
- Station (left) and CETRAM

General information
- Coordinates: 19.317673°N 99.074647°W
- Elevation: 23 m (75 ft)
- System: Mexico City Metro
- Operator: Sistema de Transporte Colectivo (STC)
- Platforms: 1 island platform
- Tracks: 2

Construction
- Structure type: Elevated
- Accessible: Yes

Other information
- Status: In service

History
- Opened: 30 October 2012; 13 years ago

Key dates
- 12 March 2014; 12 years ago: Temporarily closed
- 28 October 2015; 10 years ago: Reopened
- 3 May 2021; 5 years ago: Temporarily closed
- 15 July 2023; 3 years ago: Reopened

Passengers
- 2025: 11,143,567 (Note: The data here is limited to the most recent ten years to avoid excessive listings; earlier figures can be found in this page's history or on the Mexico City Metro website. To calculate the average daily ridership, the annual total is divided by 365 days (366 in leap years), with decimals omitted from the result. Each station per line is ranked individually, as the system counts transfer stations separately. The percentage change is calculated automatically using the data from the current year and the previous year.) ▲0.74%
- Rank: 22/195

Services
Preceding station	Mexico City Metro	Following station
Calle 11 toward Mixcoac	Line 12	Tezonco toward Tláhuac
Route map
Location
- Location within Mexico City urban area
- Area map

Periférico Oriente is a station on Line 12 of the Mexico City Metro. The station is located between Calle 11 and Tezonco. It was opened on 30 October 2012 as a part of the first stretch of Line 12 between Mixcoac and Tláhuac.

The station is located southeast of the city center, at the intersection between Avenida Tlahuac and the Anillo Periférico. It is built above the ground.

The symbol for the station depicts the outline of a prison guard tower, in reference to the nearby Reclusorio Oriente prison.

== Ridership ==
Annual passenger ridership
Year	Ridership	Average daily	Rank	% change	Ref.
2025	11,143,567	30,530	22/195	+0.74%
2024	11,061,651	30,223	20/195	+48.21%
2023	7,463,317	20,477	50/195	NA
2022	0	0	176/195	−100.00%
2021	1,916,407	5,250	141/195	−73.69%
2020	7,283,366	19,899	29/195	−39.79%
2019	12,095,813	33,139	34/195	+12.26%
2018	10,775,159	29,520	46/195	+18.22%
2017	9,114,439	24,971	54/195	+8.97%
2016	8,363,998	22,852	47/195	+286.37%
