= Parque de los Venados metro station =

Mexico City metro station

Parque de los Venados
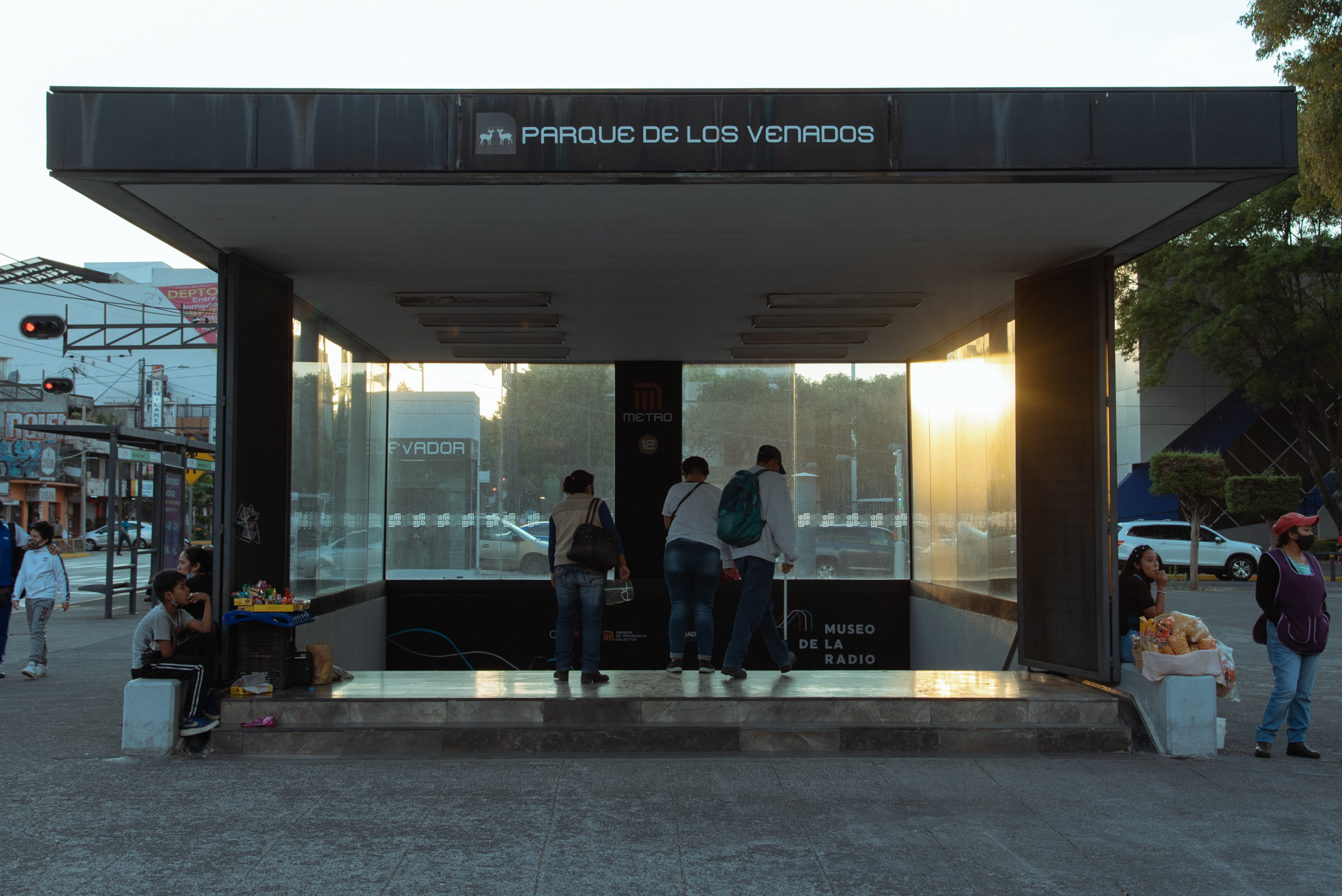
- Entrance to the station, March 2021

General information
- Location: Eje 7 Sur Municipio Libre; Santa Cruz Atoyac, Benito Juárez; Mexico City; Mexico
- Coordinates: 19.370662°N 99.158716°W
- System: Mexico City Metro
- Operator: Sistema de Transporte Colectivo (STC)
- Platforms: 2 side platforms
- Tracks: 2

Construction
- Structure type: Underground
- Cycle facilities: Yes
- Accessible: Yes

Other information
- Status: In service

History
- Opened: 30 October 2012; 13 years ago

Key dates
- 3 May 2021; 5 years ago: Temporarily closed
- 15 January 2023; 3 years ago: Reopened

Passengers
- 2025: 3,443,453 (Note: The data here is limited to the most recent ten years to avoid excessive listings; earlier figures can be found in this page's history or on the Mexico City Metro website. To calculate the average daily ridership, the annual total is divided by 365 days (366 in leap years), with decimals omitted from the result. Each station per line is ranked individually, as the system counts transfer stations separately. The percentage change is calculated automatically using the data from the current year and the previous year.) ▲7.83%
- Rank: 144/195

Services
Preceding station	Mexico City Metro	Following station
Zapata toward Mixcoac	Line 12	Eje Central toward Tláhuac
Route map
Location
- Location within Mexico City
- Area map

Parque de los Venados is a station on Line 12 of the Mexico City Metro. The station is located between Zapata and Eje Central. It was opened on 30 October 2012 as a part of the first stretch of Line 12 between Mixcoac and Tláhuac and it is built underground.

== Name and pictogram ==
The station's name originates from a nearby park, commonly known as Parque de los Venados (Park of the Deer) on account of the deer statues located there, but which was originally named Parque Francisco Villa in honor of the eponymous Mexican revolutionary leader. The station's pictogram depicts two deer, representing the aforementioned statues located at the adjacent park.

== General information ==
The station is located south of the city center, at the intersection between Eje 7 Sur Municipio Libre and Calle Uxmal in the Benito Juárez municipality. The municipality's seat is just next to the station and two of the station entrances are located in the plaza next to the government building.

During the line's construction, the remains of people believed to be of the Aztecs were found at the station site.

=== Museo de la Radio ===
The Parque de los Venados station features the Museo de la Radio (Radio Museum), inaugurated in October 2018. The museum features more than ten thousand items related to the radio its culture and history, ranging from audiovisual material and memorabilia to a letter from Porfirio Díaz.

== Ridership ==
Annual passenger ridership
Year	Ridership	Average daily	Rank	% change	Ref.
2025	3,443,453	9,434	144/195	+7.83%
2024	3,193,548	8,725	140/195	+34.28%
2023	2,378,215	6,515	147/195	NA
2022	0	0	176/195	−100.00%
2021	567,984	1,556	190/195	−73.54%
2020	2,146,646	5,865	148/195	−49.48%
2019	4,249,439	11,642	144/195	+1.75%
2018	4,176,515	11,442	144/195	+6.62%
2017	3,917,164	10,731	146/195	+8.53%
2016	3,609,186	9,861	150/195	+19.43%

== Entrances ==
- Northwest: Eje 7 Sur Municipio Libre and Uxmal street, Santa Cruz Atoyac
- Southwest: Eje 7 Sur Municipio Libre and Uxmal street, Col. Residencial Emperadores
- Northeast: Eje 7 Sur Municipio Libre and Uxmal street, Santa Cruz Atoyac
