= Calle 11 metro station =

Mexico City metro station

Calle 11
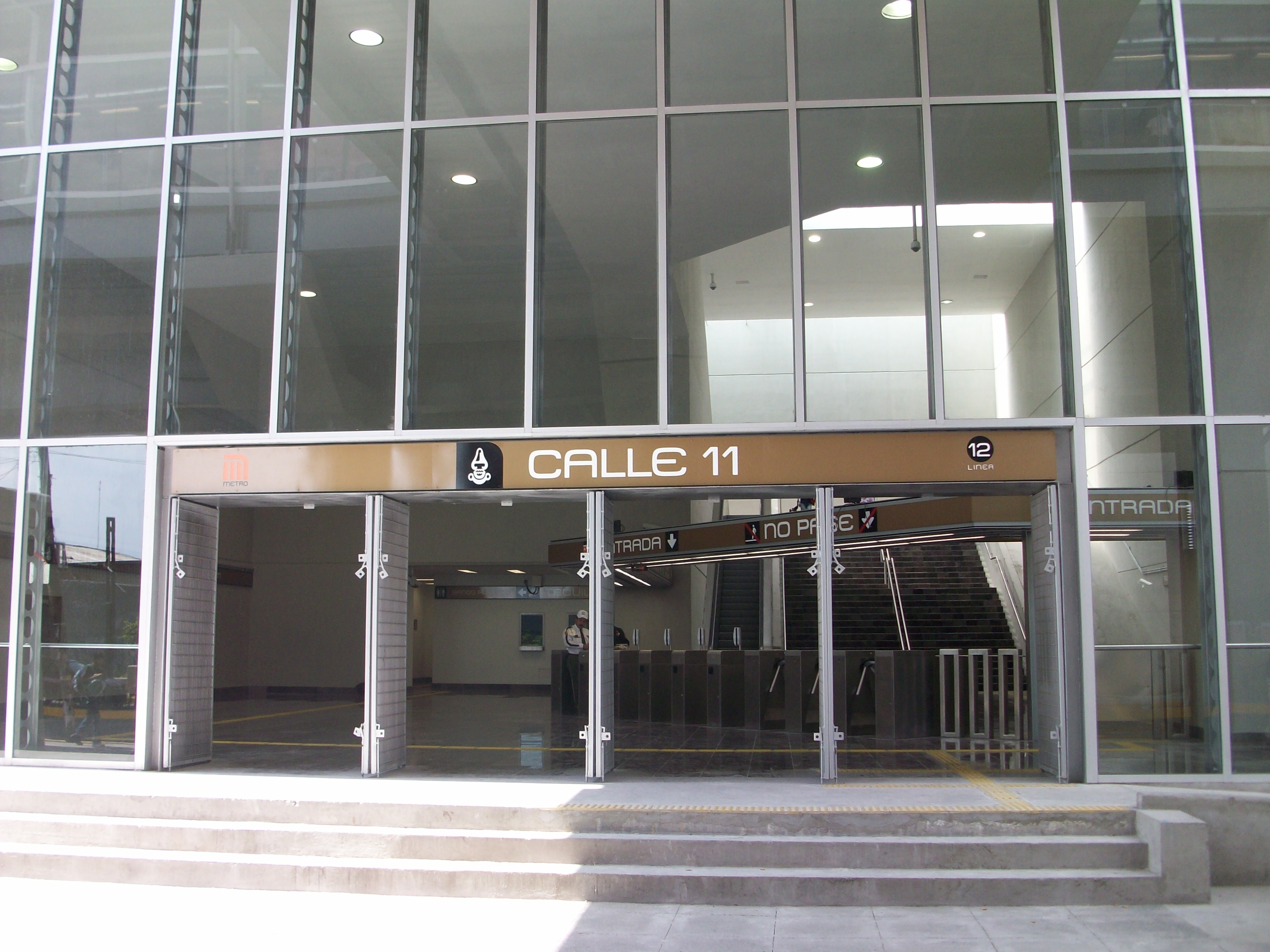
- The exterior view of the station

General information
- Coordinates: 19.320463°N 99.085734°W
- System: Mexico City Metro
- Operator: Sistema de Transporte Colectivo (STC)
- Platforms: 2 side platforms
- Tracks: 2

Construction
- Structure type: Elevated
- Accessible: yes

Other information
- Status: In service

History
- Opened: 30 October 2012; 13 years ago

Key dates
- 12 March 2014; 12 years ago: Temporarily closed
- 28 October 2015; 10 years ago: Reopened
- 3 May 2021; 5 years ago: Temporarily closed
- 15 July 2023; 3 years ago: Reopened

Passengers
- 2025: 4,224,835 (Note: The data here is limited to the most recent ten years to avoid excessive listings; earlier figures can be found in this page's history or on the Mexico City Metro website. To calculate the average daily ridership, the annual total is divided by 365 days (366 in leap years), with decimals omitted from the result. Each station per line is ranked individually, as the system counts transfer stations separately. The percentage change is calculated automatically using the data from the current year and the previous year.) ▲9.98%
- Rank: 125/195

Services
Preceding station	Mexico City Metro	Following station
Lomas Estrella toward Mixcoac	Line 12	Periférico Oriente toward Tláhuac
Route map
Location
- Location within Mexico City urban area
- Area map

Calle 11 is a station on Line 12 of the Mexico City Metro. The station is located between Lomas Estrella and Periférico Oriente. It was opened on 30 October 2012 as a part of the first stretch of Line 12 between Mixcoac and Tláhuac.

The station is located southeast of the city center, at the intersection between Avenida Tláhuac and 11 Street. It is built above the ground.

Annual passenger ridership
Year	Ridership	Average daily	Rank	% change	Ref.
2025	4,224,835	11,574	125/195	+9.98%
2024	3,841,365	10,495	126/195	+198.58%
2023	1,286,535	3,524	173/195	NA
2022	0	0	176/195	−100.00%
2021	994,257	2,723	176/195	−70.41%
2020	3,360,145	9,180	108/195	−36.72%
2019	5,309,588	14,546	123/195	+5.90%
2018	5,013,591	13,735	126/195	+6.93%
2017	4,688,487	12,845	130/195	+5.93%
2016	4,425,985	12,092	137/195	+596.87%
