= Lomas Estrella metro station =

Metro station in Mexico City, Mexico

Lomas Estrella
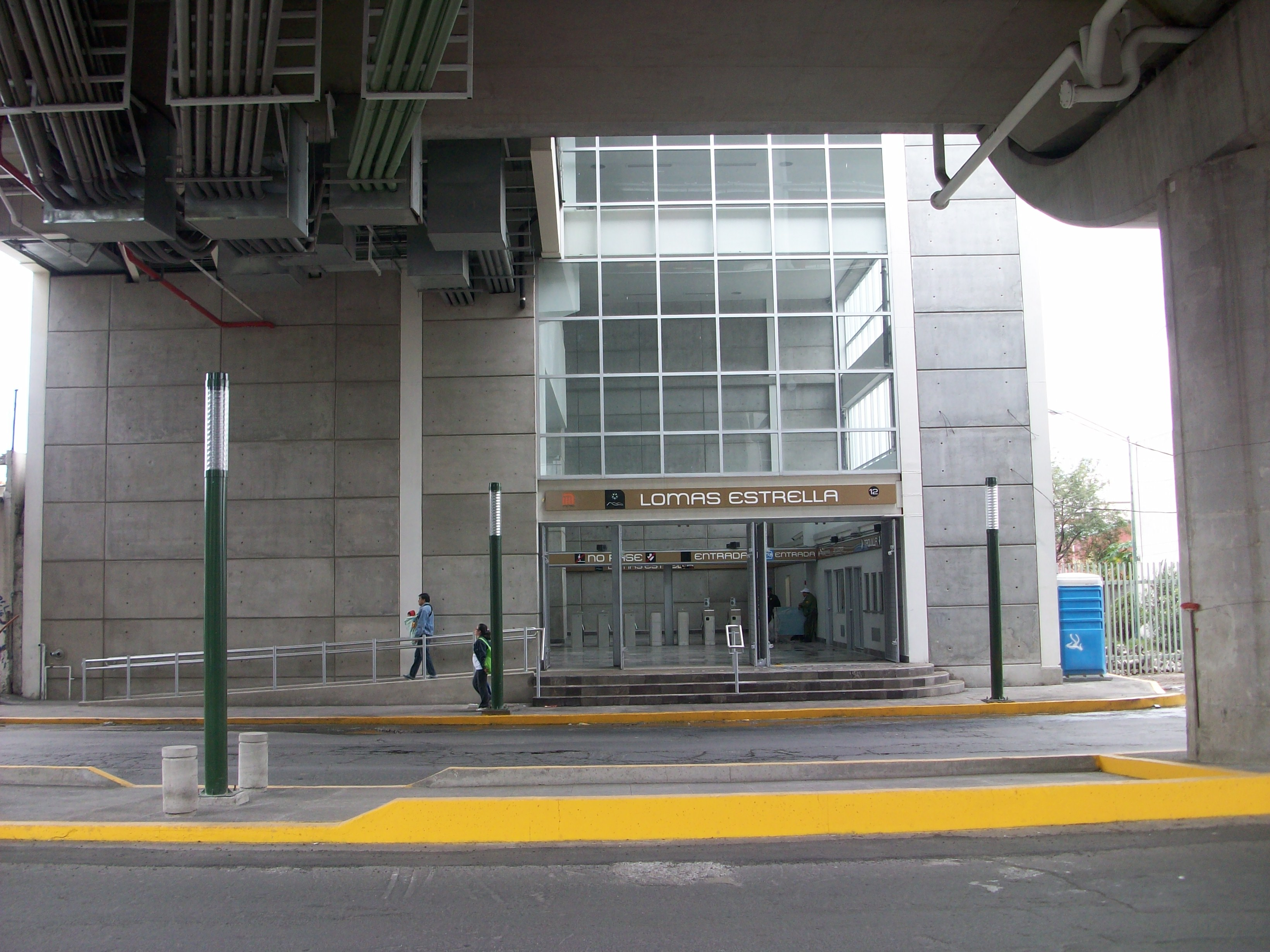
- Entrance

General information
- Coordinates: 19.322256°N 99.096111°W
- System: Mexico City Metro
- Operator: Sistema de Transporte Colectivo (STC)
- Platforms: 2 side platforms
- Tracks: 2

Construction
- Structure type: Elevated
- Accessible: yes

Other information
- Status: In service

History
- Opened: 30 October 2012; 13 years ago

Key dates
- 12 March 2014; 12 years ago: Temporarily closed
- 28 October 2015; 10 years ago: Reopened
- 3 May 2021; 5 years ago: Temporarily closed
- 15 July 2023; 3 years ago: Reopened

Passengers
- 2025: 3,089,078 (Note: The data here is limited to the most recent ten years to avoid excessive listings; earlier figures can be found in this page's history or on the Mexico City Metro website. To calculate the average daily ridership, the annual total is divided by 365 days (366 in leap years), with decimals omitted from the result. Each station per line is ranked individually, as the system counts transfer stations separately. The percentage change is calculated automatically using the data from the current year and the previous year.) ▲11.01%
- Rank: 148/195

Services
| Preceding station | Mexico City Metro | Following station |
|---|---|---|
| San Andrés Tomatlán toward Mixcoac | Line 12 | Calle 11 toward Tláhuac |
Route map
Location
- Location within Mexico City urban area
- Area map

Lomas Estrella is a station on Line 12 of the Mexico City Metro. The station is located between San Andrés Tomatlán and Calle 11. It was opened on 30 October 2012 as a part of the first stretch of Line 12 between Mixcoac and Tláhuac.

The station is located southeast of the city center, at the intersection between Avenida Tláhuac and Paseo Galias. It is built above the ground. The station pictogram depicts three hills with a star floating above them, referring to the Lomas Estrella ("Star Hills") neighborhood served by the station.

== Ridership ==
Annual passenger ridership
| Year | Ridership | Average daily | Rank | % change | Ref. |
|---|---|---|---|---|---|
| 2025 | 3,089,078 | 8,463 | 148/195 | +11.01% |
| 2024 | 2,782,711 | 7,603 | 149/195 | +204.09% |
| 2023 | 915,091 | 2,507 | 179/195 | NA |
| 2022 | 0 | 0 | 176/195 | −100.00% |
| 2021 | 545,971 | 1,495 | 191/195 | −77.59% |
| 2020 | 2,435,885 | 6,655 | 139/195 | −45.64% |
| 2019 | 4,481,178 | 12,277 | 139/195 | +2.38% |
| 2018 | 4,376,819 | 11,991 | 139/195 | +8.57% |
| 2017 | 4,031,403 | 11,044 | 142/195 | +15.97% |
| 2016 | 3,476,299 | 9,498 | 152/195 | +727.99% |
