= San Andrés Tomatlán metro station =

Mexico City metro station

San Andrés Tomatlán
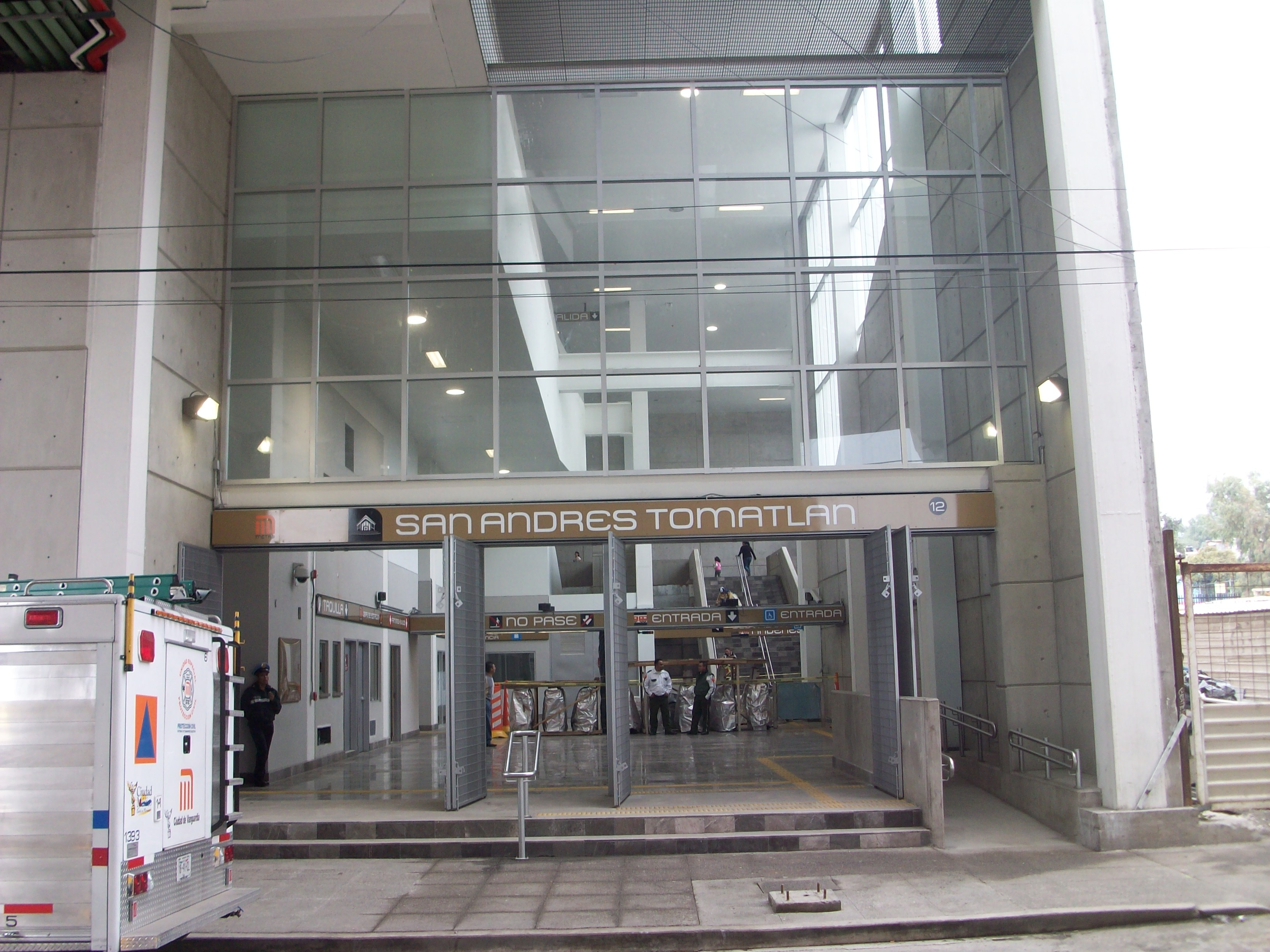
- Entrance to the station

General information
- Location: Mexico
- Coordinates: 19.328306°N 99.104868°W
- System: Mexico City Metro
- Operator: Sistema de Transporte Colectivo (STC)
- Platforms: 2 side platforms
- Tracks: 2

Construction
- Structure type: Elevated
- Accessible: yes

Other information
- Status: In service

History
- Opened: 30 October 2012; 13 years ago

Key dates
- 12 March 2014; 12 years ago: Temporarily closed
- 28 October 2015; 10 years ago: Reopened
- 3 May 2021; 5 years ago: Temporarily closed
- 15 July 2023; 3 years ago: Reopened

Passengers
- 2025: 3,406,635 (Note: The data here is limited to the most recent ten years to avoid excessive listings; earlier figures can be found in this page's history or on the Mexico City Metro website. To calculate the average daily ridership, the annual total is divided by 365 days (366 in leap years), with decimals omitted from the result. Each station per line is ranked individually, as the system counts transfer stations separately. The percentage change is calculated automatically using the data from the current year and the previous year.) ▲4.4%
- Rank: 145/195

Services
Preceding station	Mexico City Metro	Following station
Culhuacán toward Mixcoac	Line 12	Lomas Estrella toward Tláhuac
Route map
Location
- Location within Mexico City
- Area map

San Andrés Tomatlán is a station on Line 12 of the Mexico City Metro. The station is located between Culhuacán and Lomas Estrella. It was opened on 30 October 2012 as a part of the first stretch of Line 12 between Mixcoac and Tláhuac.

The station is located southeast of the city center, at the intersection between Avenida Tláhuac and Calle Luis Galvani. It is built above the ground.

The station is named after the neighborhood of San Andrés Tomatlán and the icon depicts the local church of San Andrés Apostol located just to the west of the station.

From 23 April to 22 June 2020, the station was temporarily closed due to the COVID-19 pandemic in Mexico.

== Ridership ==
Annual passenger ridership
Year	Ridership	Average daily	Rank	% change	Ref.
2025	3,406,635	9,333	145/195	+4.40%
2024	3,263,031	8,915	137/195	+200.07%
2023	1,087,421	2,979	177/195	NA
2022	0	0	176/195	−100.00%
2021	628,588	1,722	188/195	−69.90%
2020	2,088,282	5,705	152/195	−53.74%
2019	4,514,716	12,369	137/195	+9.45%
2018	4,124,954	11,301	145/195	+11.83%
2017	3,688,601	10,105	149/195	+11.37%
2016	3,312,057	9,049	155/195	+635.67%
