= Eje Central metro station =

Mexico City metro station

Eje Central
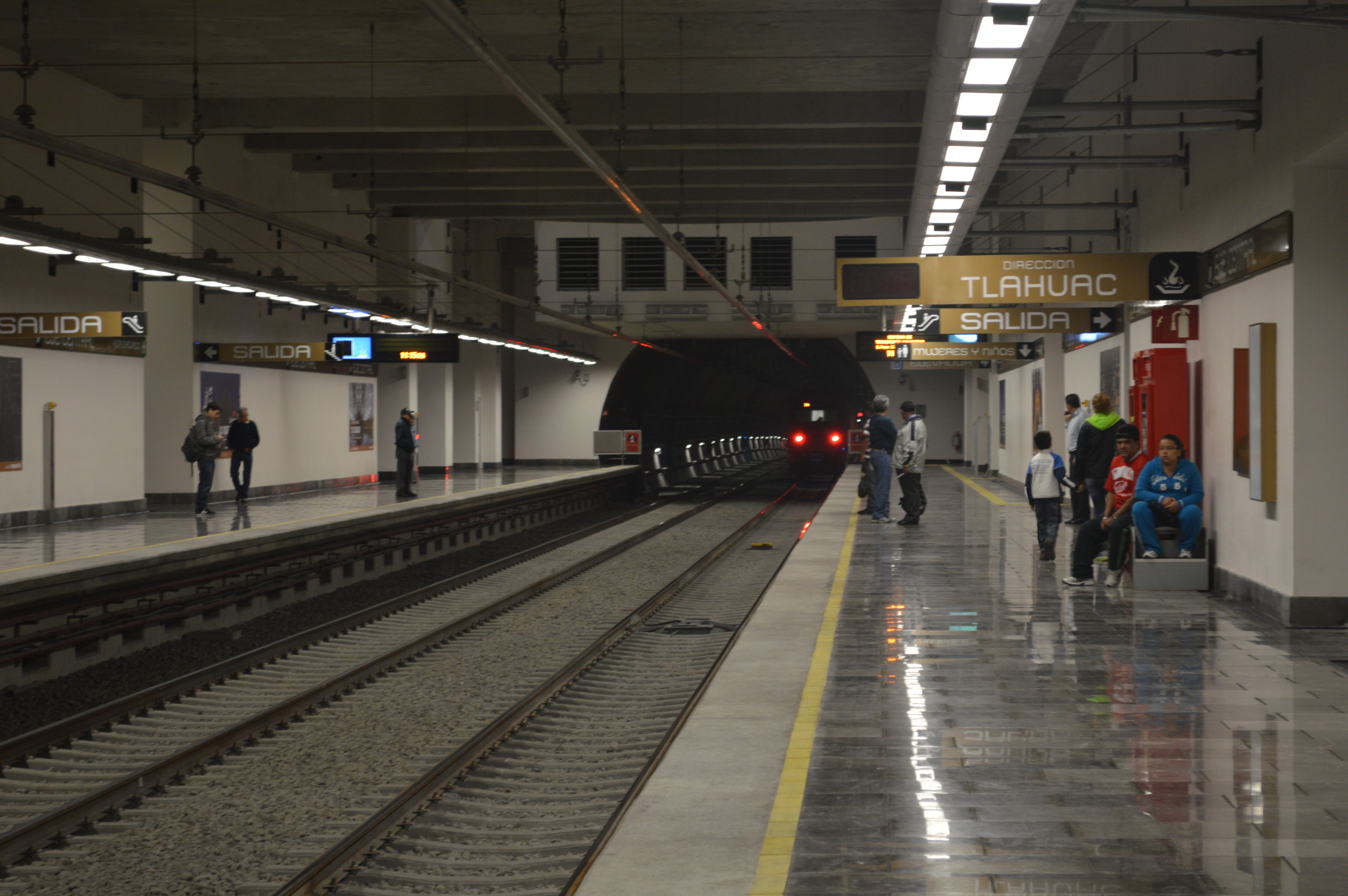
- Platforms

General information
- Coordinates: 19.361351°N 99.151416°W
- System: Mexico City Metro
- Operator: Sistema de Transporte Colectivo (STC)
- Platforms: 2 side platforms
- Tracks: 2

Construction
- Structure type: Underground
- Accessible: Yes

Other information
- Status: In service

History
- Opened: 30 October 2012; 13 years ago

Key dates
- 3 May 2021; 5 years ago: Temporarily closed
- 15 January 2023; 3 years ago: Reopened

Passengers
- 2025: 3,867,359 (Note: The data here is limited to the most recent ten years to avoid excessive listings; earlier figures can be found in this page's history or on the Mexico City Metro website. To calculate the average daily ridership, the annual total is divided by 365 days (366 in leap years), with decimals omitted from the result. Each station per line is ranked individually, as the system counts transfer stations separately. The percentage change is calculated automatically using the data from the current year and the previous year.) ▲4.43%
- Rank: 134/195

Services
Preceding station	Mexico City Metro	Following station
Parque de los Venados toward Mixcoac	Line 12	Ermita toward Tláhuac
Route map
Location
- Location within Mexico City
- Area map

Eje Central is a station on Line 12 of the Mexico City Metro. The station is located between Parque de los Venados and Ermita. It was opened on 30 October 2012 as a part of the first stretch of Line 12 between Mixcoac and Tláhuac.

== Name and pictogram ==
The station receives its name due to being located at the intersection between Eje Central (Lázaro Cardenas) and Avenida Popocatépetl. The station's pictogram shows the outline of a Mexico City trolleybus, since Line 1 of Mexico City trolleybus service (also known as the Zero Emissions Corridor) runs all the way on the Eje Central.

== General information ==
The station is located south of the city center in the Portales Sur neighborhood in the Benito Juárez borough and it is built underground.

From 23 April to 22 June 2020, the station was temporarily closed due to the COVID-19 pandemic in Mexico.

== Ridership ==
Annual passenger ridership
Year	Ridership	Average daily	Rank	% change	Ref.
2025	3,867,359	10,595	134/195	+4.43%
2024	3,703,377	10,118	131/195	+40.90%
2023	2,628,353	7,200	137/195	NA
2022	0	0	176/195	−100.00%
2021	664,899	1,821	187/195	−67.97%
2020	2,075,787	5,671	153/195	−49.09%
2019	4,077,416	11,171	147/195	+6.57%
2018	3,826,126	10,482	151/195	+9.52%
2017	3,493,383	9,570	155/195	+4.87%
2016	3,331,007	9,101	154/195	+37.78%
