= Hospital 20 de Noviembre metro station =

Mexico City metro station

Hospital 20 de Noviembre
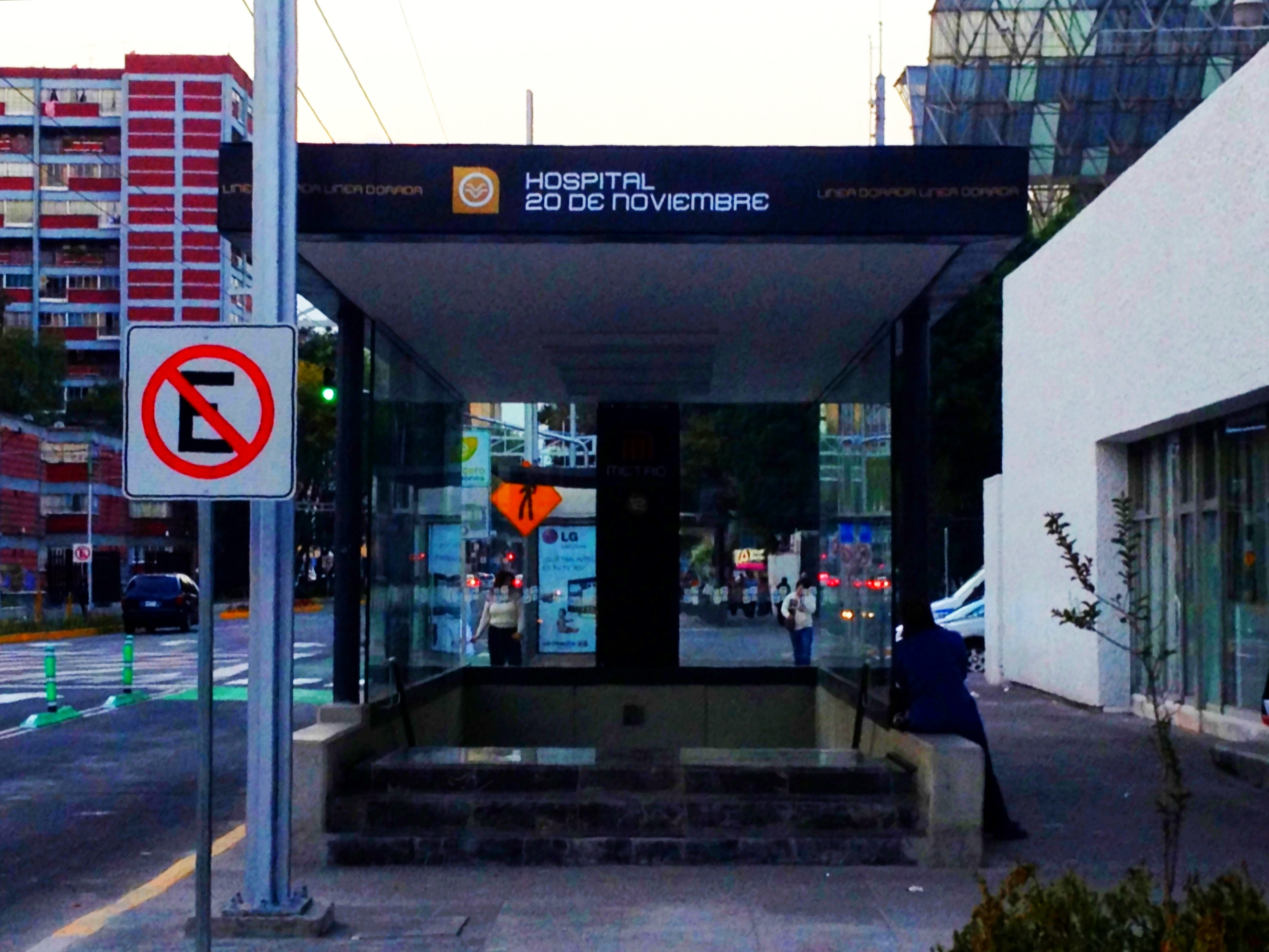

General information
- Coordinates: 19.372042°N 99.171005°W
- System: Mexico City Metro
- Operator: Sistema de Transporte Colectivo (STC)
- Platforms: 2 side platforms
- Tracks: 2

Construction
- Structure type: Underground
- Cycle facilities: Yes
- Accessible: Yes

Other information
- Status: In service

History
- Opened: 30 October 2012; 13 years ago

Key dates
- 3 May 2021; 5 years ago: Temporarily closed
- 15 January 2023; 3 years ago: Reopened

Passengers
- 2025: 3,460,894 (Note: The data here is limited to the most recent ten years to avoid excessive listings; earlier figures can be found in this page's history or on the Mexico City Metro website. To calculate the average daily ridership, the annual total is divided by 365 days (366 in leap years), with decimals omitted from the result. Each station per line is ranked individually, as the system counts transfer stations separately. The percentage change is calculated automatically using the data from the current year and the previous year.) ▲1.83%
- Rank: 143/195

Services
Preceding station	Mexico City Metro	Following station
Insurgentes Sur toward Mixcoac	Line 12	Zapata toward Tláhuac
Route map
Location
- Location within Mexico City
- Area map

Hospital 20 de Noviembre is a station on Line 12 of the Mexico City Metro. The station is located between Insurgentes Sur and Zapata. It was opened on 30 October 2012 as part of the first stretch of Line 12 between Mixcoac and Tláhuac.

== General information ==
The station is located south of the city center, at the intersection between Eje 7 Sur Félix Cuevas and Avenida Coyoacán. It is built underground.

The name of the station originates from the nearby hospital, and the station's icon depicts the hospital's distinctive roof structure.

Hospital 20 de Noviembre serves Colonia Del Valle Sur neighborhood.

According to the earlier Line 12 project, this station's planned name was Del Valle.

== Ridership ==
Annual passenger ridership
Year	Ridership	Average daily	Rank	% change	Ref.
2025	3,460,894	9,481	143/195	+1.83%
2024	3,398,621	9,285	134/195	+21.03%
2023	2,808,016	7,693	135/195	NA
2022	0	0	176/195	−100.00%
2021	593,128	1,625	189/195	−73.41%
2020	2,230,428	6,094	145/195	−48.01%
2019	4,290,490	11,754	142/195	−0.83%
2018	4,326,521	11,853	140/195	+2.63%
2017	4,215,476	11,549	138/195	+1.57%
2016	4,150,150	11,339	141/195	+7.11%

== Gallery ==
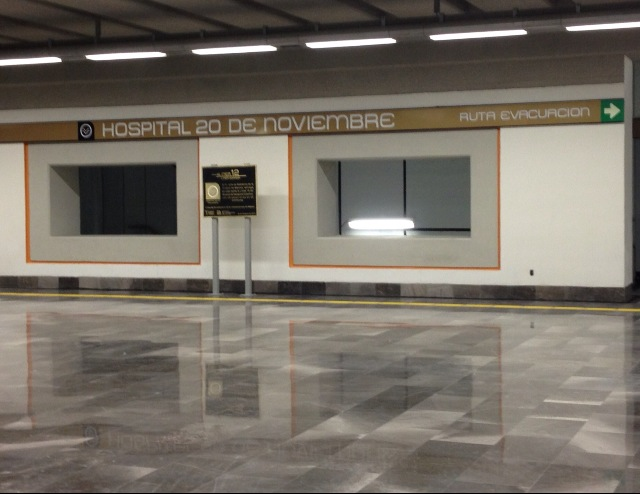
Station mezzanine
