= Insurgentes Sur metro station =

Mexico City metro station

Insurgentes Sur
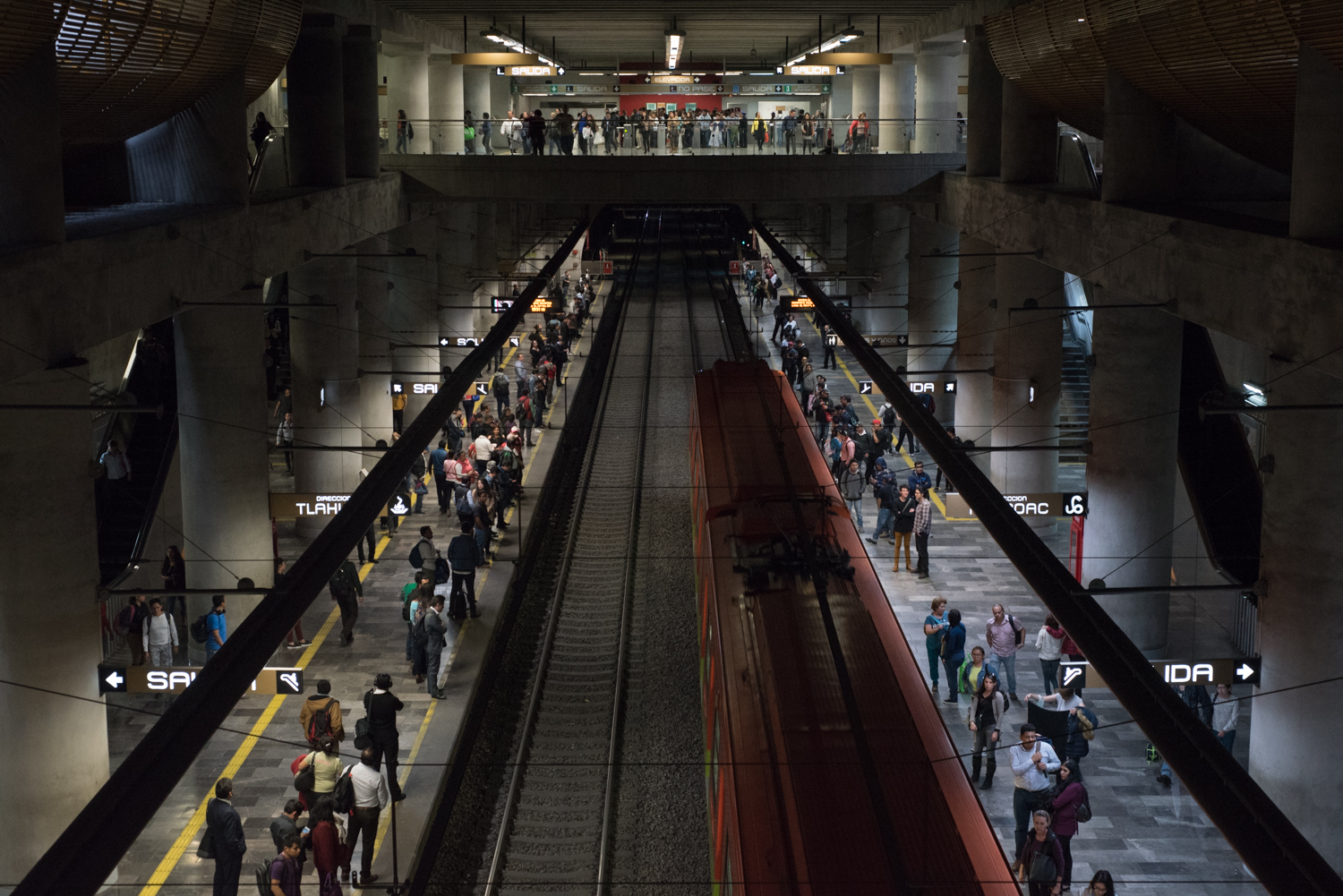
- Station as of May 2018

General information
- Location: Eje 7 Sur Félix Cuevas; Colonia del Valle, Benito Juárez; Mexico City; Mexico
- Coordinates: 19.373581°N 99.178762°W
- System: Mexico City Metro
- Operator: Sistema de Transporte Colectivo (STC)
- Platforms: 2 side platforms
- Tracks: 2
- Connections: Félix Cuevas

Construction
- Platform levels: 1
- Parking: No
- Cycle facilities: Yes
- Accessible: Yes

Other information
- Status: In service

History
- Opened: 30 October 2012; 13 years ago

Key dates
- 3 May 2021; 5 years ago: Temporarily closed
- 15 January 2023; 3 years ago: Reopened

Passengers
- 2025: 11,325,317 (Note: The data here is limited to the most recent ten years to avoid excessive listings; earlier figures can be found in this page's history or on the Mexico City Metro website. To calculate the average daily ridership, the annual total is divided by 365 days (366 in leap years), with decimals omitted from the result. Each station per line is ranked individually, as the system counts transfer stations separately. The percentage change is calculated automatically using the data from the current year and the previous year.) ▲6.01%
- Rank: 20/195

Services
Preceding station	Mexico City Metro	Following station
Mixcoac Terminus	Line 12	Hospital 20 de Noviembre toward Tláhuac
Route map
Location
- Location within Mexico City
- Area map

Insurgentes Sur is a station on Line 12 of the Mexico City Metro. The station is located between Mixcoac and Hospital 20 de Noviembre. It was opened on 30 October 2012 as part of the first stretch of Line 12 between Mixcoac and Tláhuac. It is built underground.

== General information ==
The station is located south of the city center, at the intersection between Avenida de los Insurgentes, Eje 7 Sur Extremadura, and Eje 7 Félix Cuevas, in the Benito Juárez borough. The station, thus, receives its name from being at the southern section of the Avenida de los Insurgentes.

The icon for the station depicts Miguel Hidalgo and José Morelos, two of the main rebel leaders during the Mexican War of Independence.

The station serves the following neighborhoods: Colonia del Valle, Tlacoquemecatl del Valle, Extremadura Insurgentes, and San José Insurgentes.

In the initial Line 12 plans, the station was to be named Extremadura, due to its location at the intersection of Avenida de los Insurgentes Sur and Eje 7 Sur, which receives the name of Félix Cuevas to the east of Avenida de los Insurgentes, and Extremadura to the west of the Insurgentes avenue.

=== Ridership ===
Annual passenger ridership
Year	Ridership	Average daily	Rank	% change	Ref.
2025	11,325,317	31,028	20/195	+6.01%
2024	10,683,601	29,190	23/195	+45.97%
2023	7,319,015	20,052	52/195	NA
2022	0	0	176/195	−100.00%
2021	1,807,375	4,951	145/195	−71.97%
2020	6,447,262	17,615	38/195	−50.31%
2019	12,976,044	35,550	25/195	+6.51%
2018	12,182,849	33,377	31/195	+8.94%
2017	11,182,761	30,637	40/195	+6.15%
2016	10,534,634	28,738	46/195	+17.35%

== Station layout ==
Street Level

B1	Mezzanine

Line 12 platforms	Side platform, doors will open on the right
Line 12 platforms	Westbound	← toward Mixcoac (Mixcoac)
Line 12 platforms	Eastbound	toward Tláhuac (Hospital 20 de Noviembre) →
Line 12 platforms	Side platform, doors will open on the right

== Nearby ==
- Parque Hundido, park.
- Parque San Lorenzo, park.
- Galerías Insurgentes, shopping mall.

== Exits ==
- Northwest: Avenida de los Insurgentes Sur and Eje 7 Sur Félix Cuevas, Col. Tlacoquemécatl del Valle
- Southwest: Avenida de los Insurgentes Sur and Eje 7 Sur Félix Cuevas, Col. Actipán
- Northeast: Eje 7 Sur Félix Cuevas and Tejocotes street, Col. Tlacoquemécatl del Valle

== Gallery ==
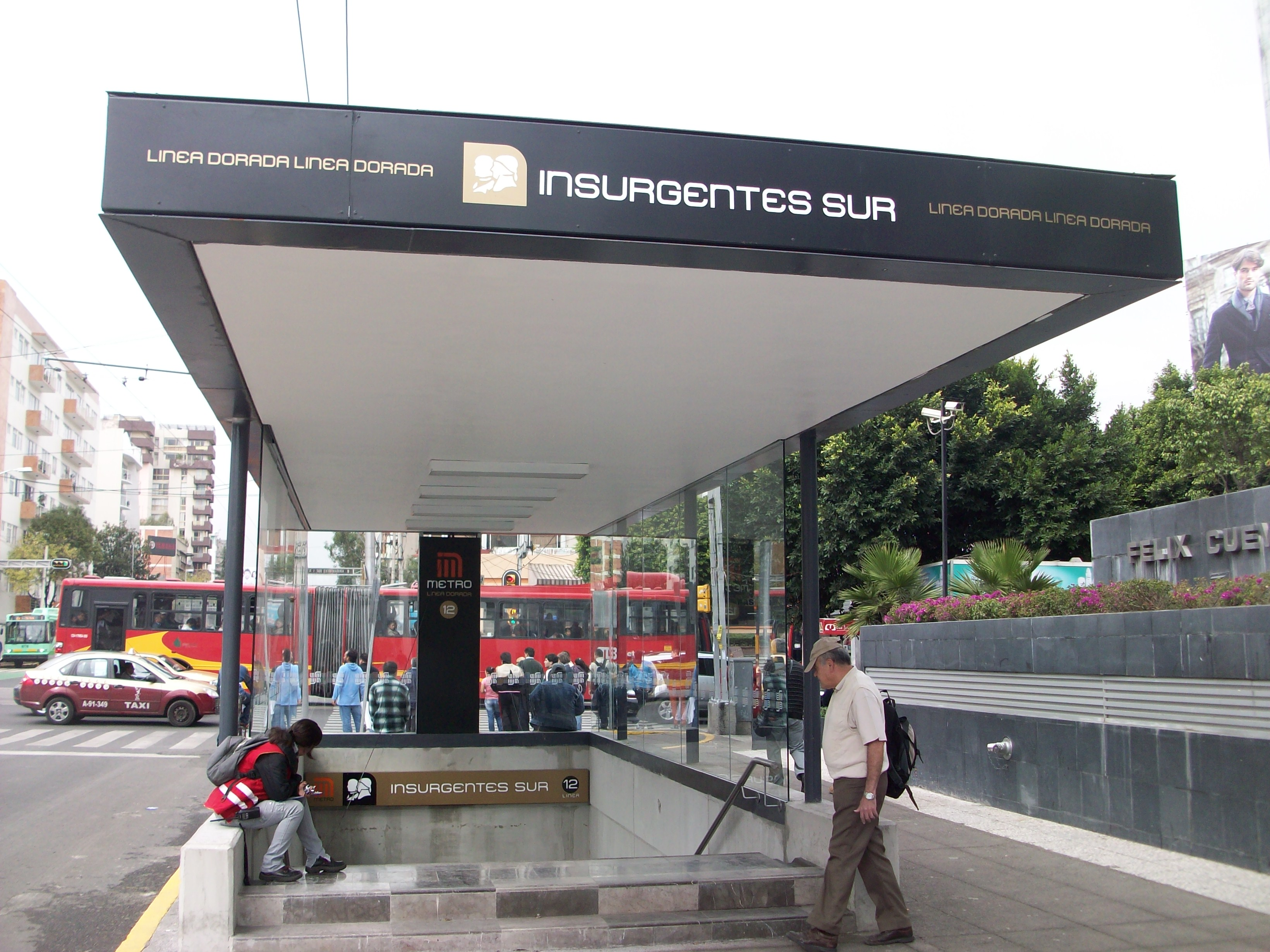
Entrance to the station after its opening in 2012

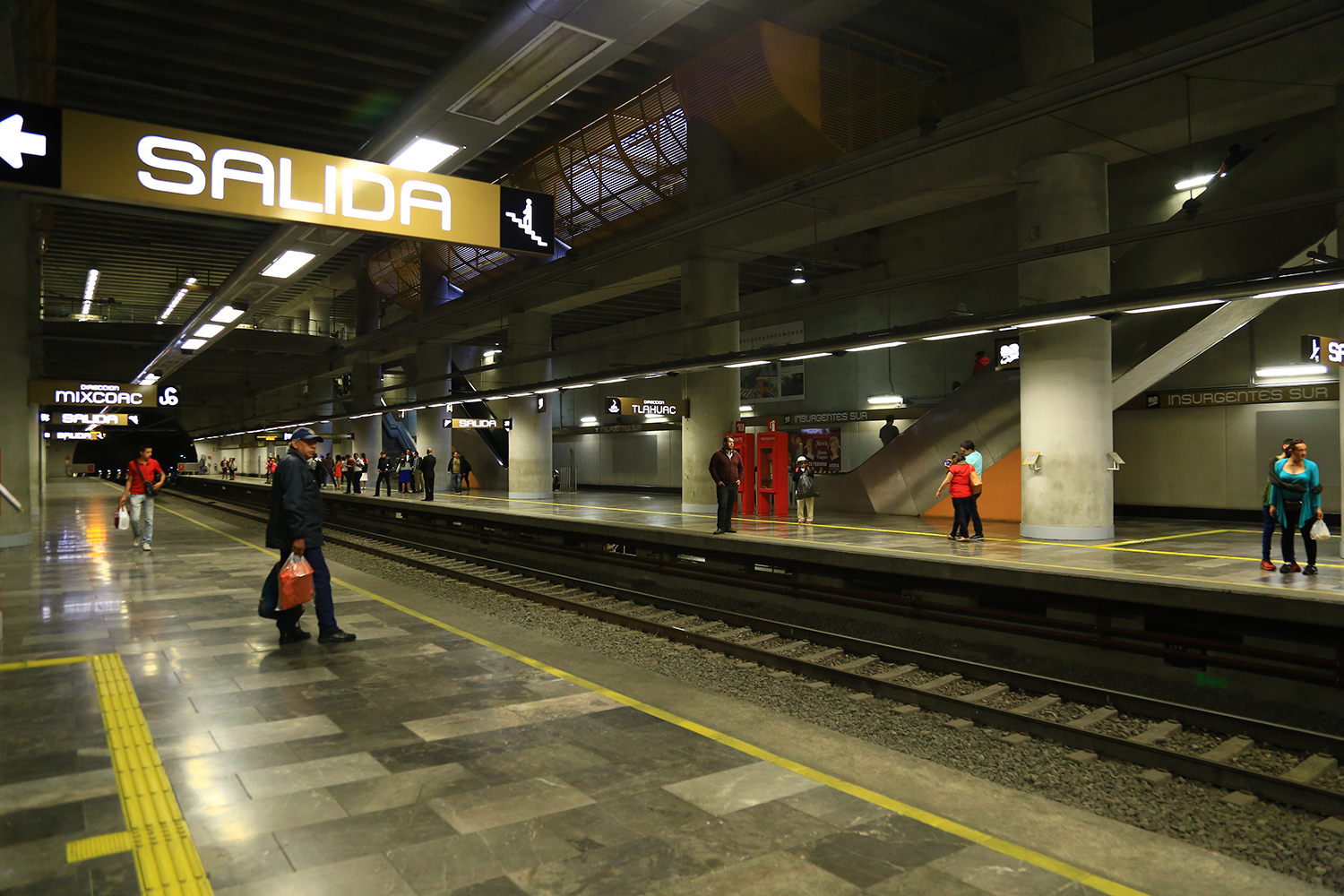
Station platforms
