= Eje vial =

Network of arterial roads in Mexico City

The system of ejes viales (singular: eje vial, lit. "road axis") in Mexico City is a large network of wide arterial roads with coordinated traffic signals. They are mainly directed in one-way with a single lane going in the opposite direction used exclusively by public transportation. The network was a project of Mexico City mayor Carlos Hank González and the first part of the network, after extensive construction and demolition of buildings and removal of trees, opened in 1979. With the exception of the Eje Central, a south-to-north eje passing through the historic center of Mexico City, the ejes are numbered with cardinal directions, for example going north from the center: Eje 1 Norte, then Eje 2 Norte, and so forth. In addition to the Eje number and directional, the streets retain their individual names, with one eje thus consisting of multiple sequential individually named streets.

First proposal for system of ejes viales, showing some connecting sections that were never built	Current state of ejes viales, showing incomplete and partially complete sections.

== List of Ejes Viales ==
=== Central ===
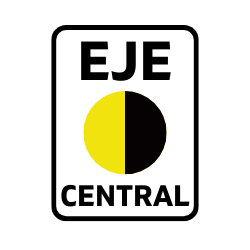
Eje Central

==== Eje Central Lázaro Cárdenas ====
(Mostly south-to-north with counterflow lane)

- Avenida Aztecas (From Av. Antonio Delfín Madrigal to Eje 10 Sur (Av. Pedro Henríquez Ureña))
- Monserrat (Norte - Sur) & Candelaria (Sur - Norte)(From Eje 10 Sur to División del Norte)
- División del Norte (To Circuito Interior Río Churubusco, No es parte del Eje Central)
- Ajusco (From Circuito Interior to Lázaro Cárdenas)
- Lázaro Cárdenas (From Ajusco to Paganini / Circuito Interior Rio Consulado)
- Av. de los 100 Metros (From Circuito Interior to Anillo Periférico Acueducto de Tenayuca)

=== North (“Norte”) ===
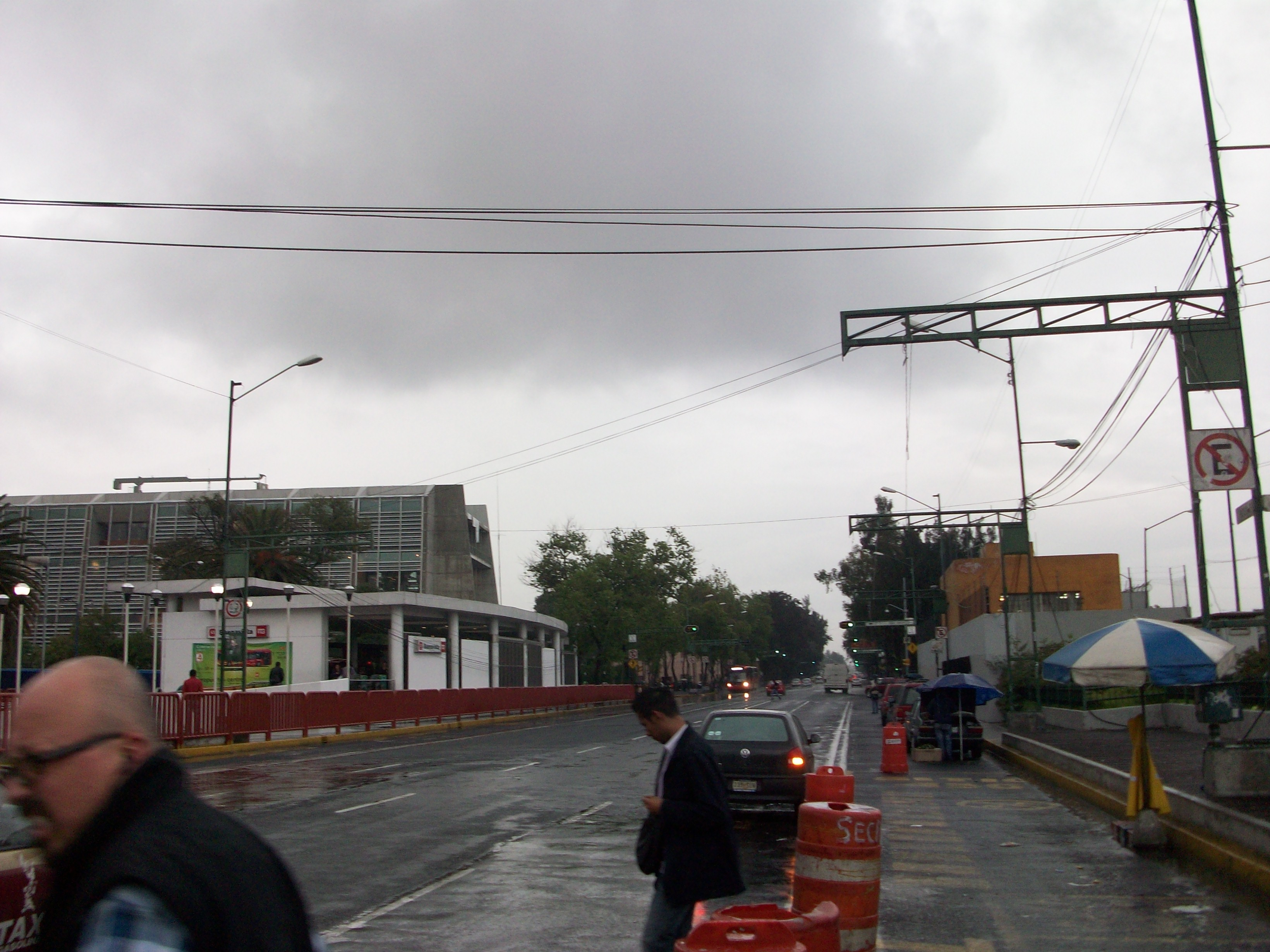
Eje 1 Norte Av. Mosqueta

==== Eje 1 Norte ====
(Mostly west-to-east with counterflow)

- José Antonio Alzate (From Circuito Interior Paseo de las Jacarandas to Insurgentes)
- Mosqueta (De Insurgentes a Paseo de la Reforma and Eje Central)
- Ignacio López Rayón / Avenida Héroe de Granaditas (De Eje Central to Eje 1 Ote (Vidal Alcocer))
- Av. del Trabajo (De Eje 1 Ote a Eje 2 Ote (Congreso de la Unión))
- Albañiles (De Eje 2 Ote to Oceanía)
- Norte 17 (From Oceanía to Circuito Interior Blvd. Puerto Aéreo)
- Hangares Aviación / Fuerza Aérea Mexicana (From Circuito Interior to Av. Santos Dumont)
- Manuel Lebrija (From Santos Dumont to Eje 4 Ote (Canal de Churubusco))
- Talleres Gráficos (From Canal de Churubusco to Calle 4)
- Avenida Xochimilco (De Calle 4 a Anillo Periférico Calle 7)
- Avenida Pantitlán (Not considered part of the Eje Vial, in Nezahualcóyotl and Los Reyes, State of Mexico)

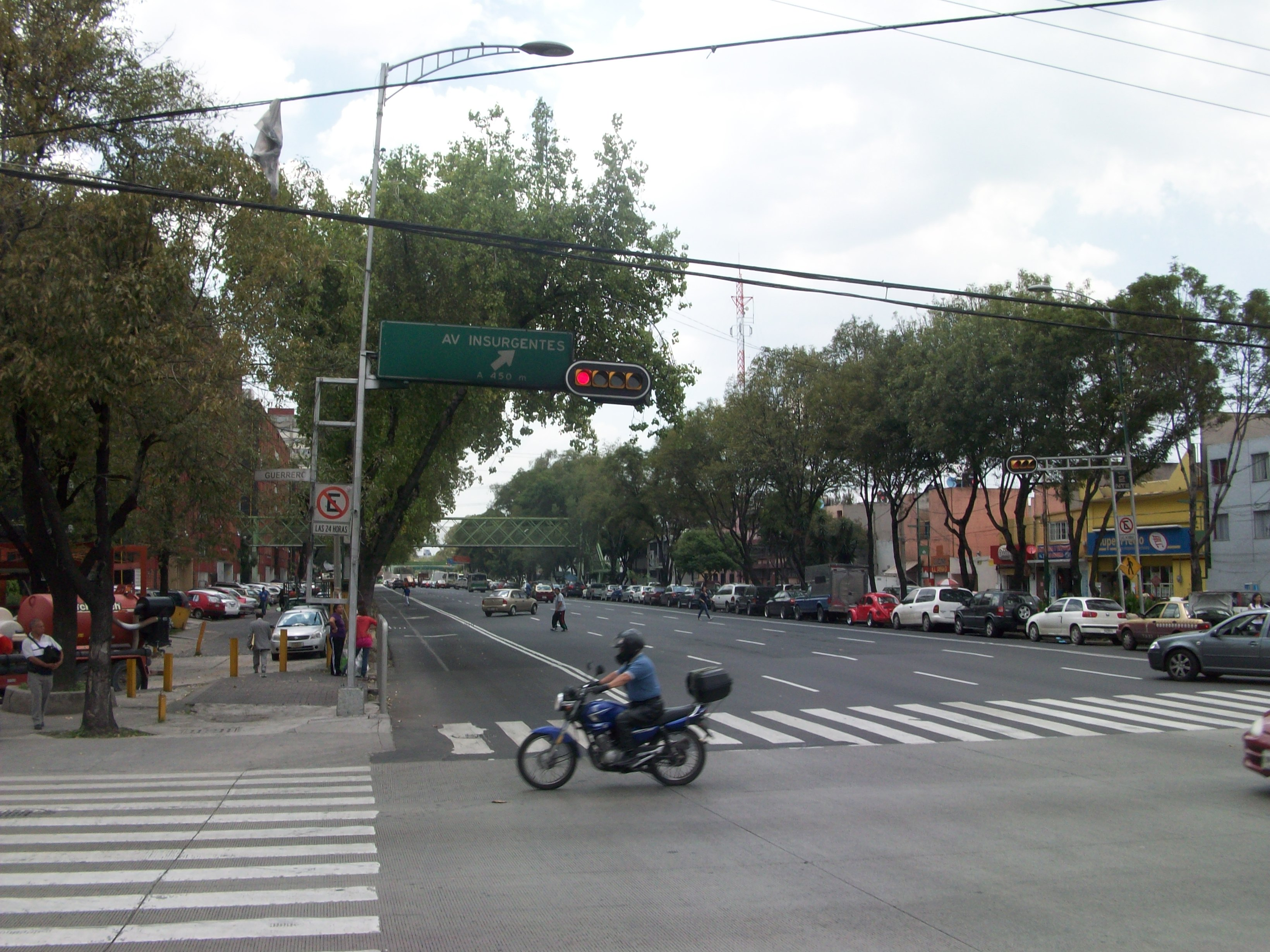
Eje 2 Norte Av. Manuel González.

==== Eje 2 Norte ====
(East-to-west with counterflow lane)

- Transvaal (De Circuito Interior Rio Consulado a Oceanía and Oceanía to Gran Canal)
- Canal del Norte (De Gran Canal to Paseo de la Reforma)
- Manuel González (From Paseo de la Reforma to Insurgentes)
- Profr. Eulalia Guzmán (De Insurgentes a Calzada de Camarones)
- Biólogo Maximino Martínez (No longer considered Eje Vial, from Camarones To Av. Cuitláhuac (Two-way))

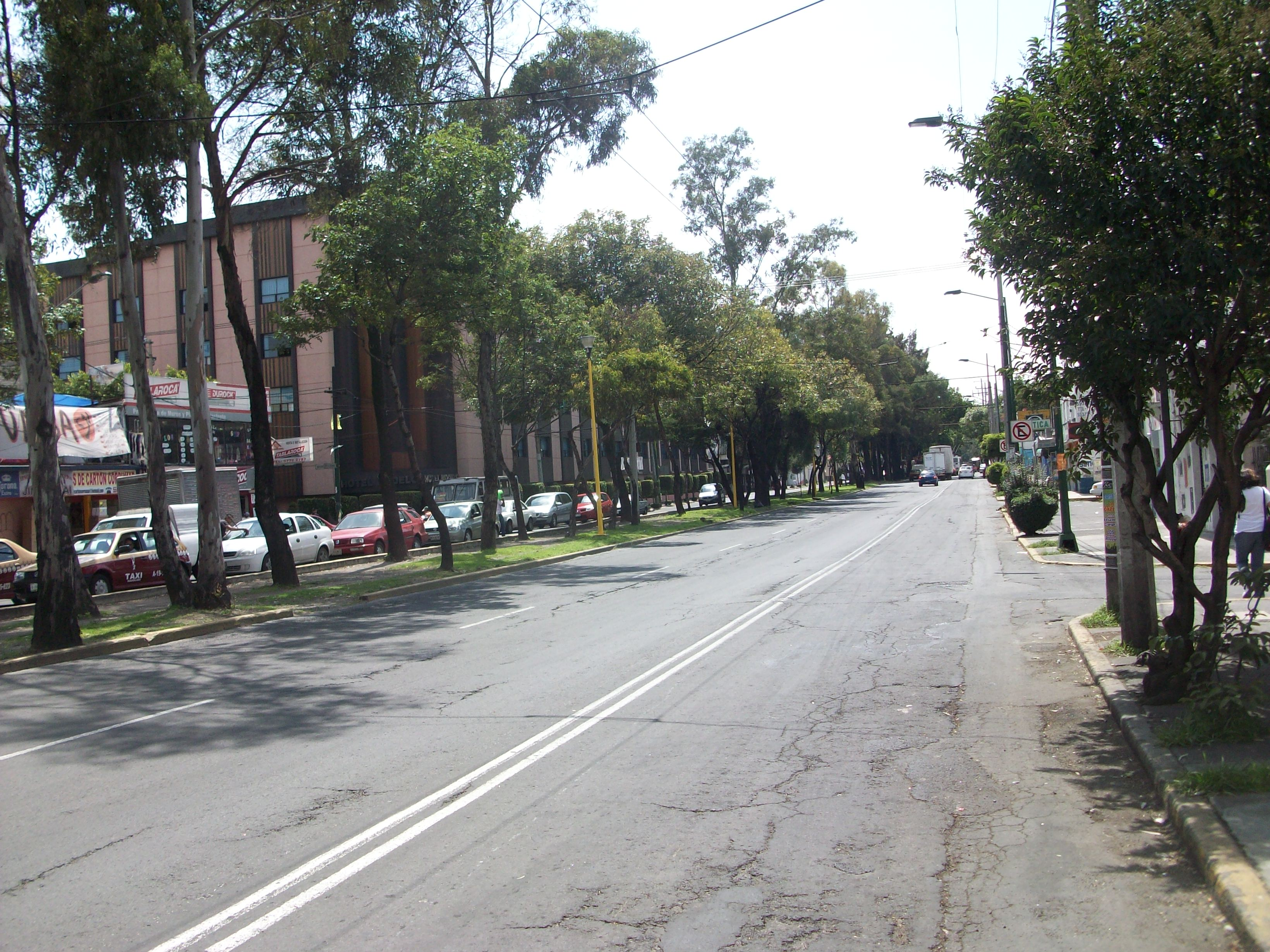
Eje 3 Norte Av. Alfredo Robles Domínguez.

==== Eje 3 Norte ====
(Mostly two-way)

- Super-Avenida Lomas Verdes / Hacienda de la Guaracha / La Cima (Not considered Eje Vial, from La Cúspide Lomas Verdes to Calzada de las Armas, in the State of Mexico)
- Calz. San Isidro Tecpatl (From Las Armas to Av. Tezozómoc)
- Tochtli (Pte - Ote)(From Tezozómoc to Aquiles Serdán)
- Manuel Acuña / 16 de Septiembre (Ote - Pte) (From Aquiles Serdán to Av. 22 de febrero)
- Calzada Camarones (From Aquiles Serdán to Av. de las Granjas / Glorieta de Camarones)
- Avenida Cuitláhuac (From Av. de las Granjas to Insurgentes and Eje Central)
- Alfredo Robles Domínguez (From Eje Central to Calzada de Guadalupe)
- Noé (From Calz. de Guadalupe to Eje 1 Ote Ferrocarril Hidalgo)
- Ángel Albino Corzo / Oriente 101 (From Eje 1 Ote to Gran Canal / Avenida 503)
- Avenida 506 (From Avenida 503 to Avenida 608, Vialidad Poniente - Oriente, assisted by Av. 508 (Par Vial) Oriente – Poniente)
- Avenida 602 / Texcoco / Vía Tapo (From Oceanía to Anillo Periférico Río de los Remedios, no longer considered an Eje Vial.

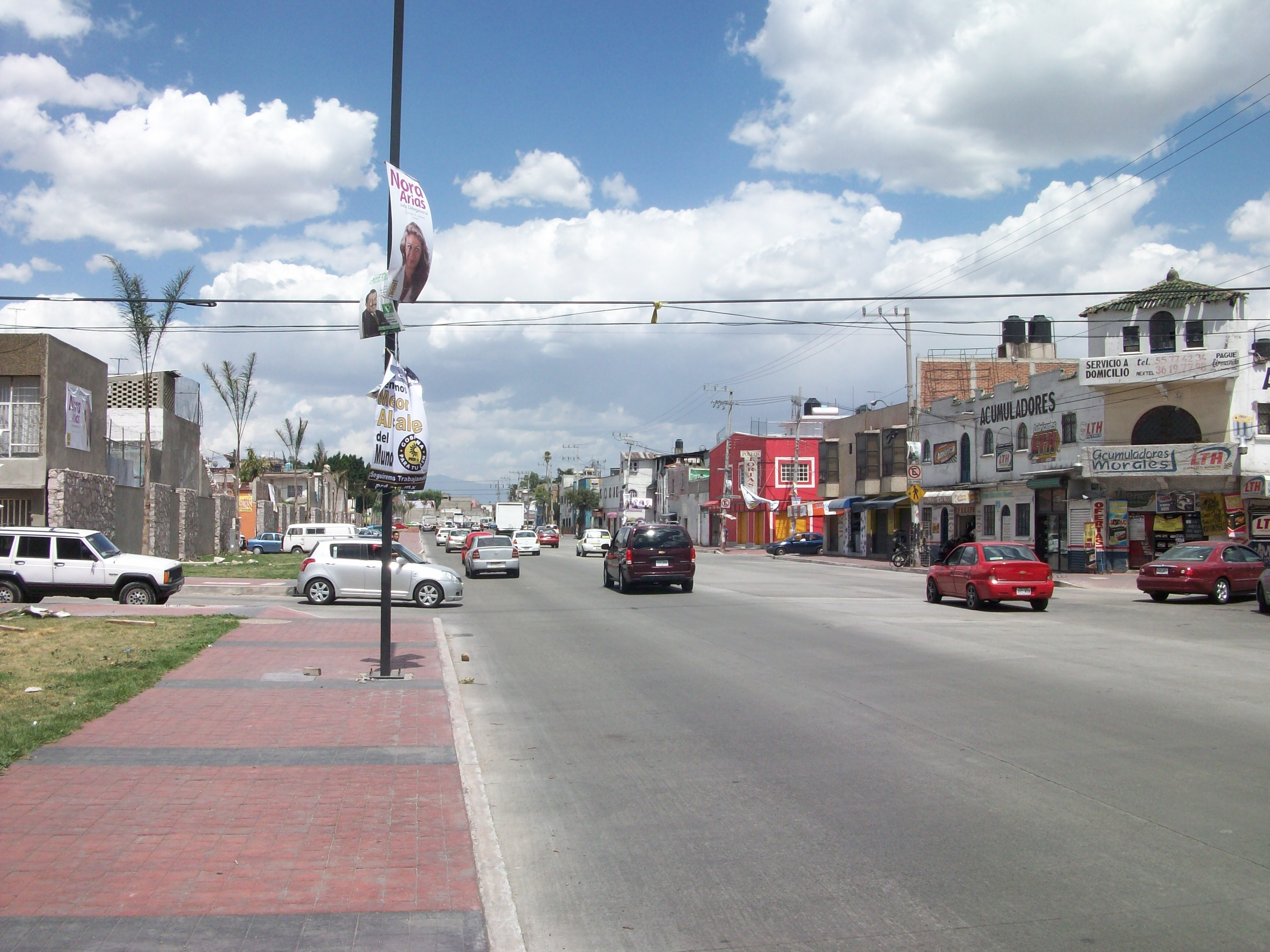
Eje 4 Norte Av. Euzkaro

==== Eje 4 Norte ====
(Two-way and west-to-east)

- Av. Ahuehuetes / Esperanza / Refinería Azcapotzalco (From Aquiles Serdán to Av. Azcapotzalco)
- Antigua Calzada de Guadalupe (From Av. Azcapotzalco to Ceylan)
- Av. Azcapotzalco - La Villa (From Ceylan to Norte 35)
- Poniente 128 (From Norte 35 to Eje Central Av. de los 100 Metros)
- Fortuna (From Eje Central to Insurgentes)
- Euzkaro (From Insurgentes to Calzada de Guadalupe)
- Talismán (From Calz. de Guadalupe to Gran Canal)
- Avenida 510 (From Gran Canal to Eje 5 Nte Avenida 412)

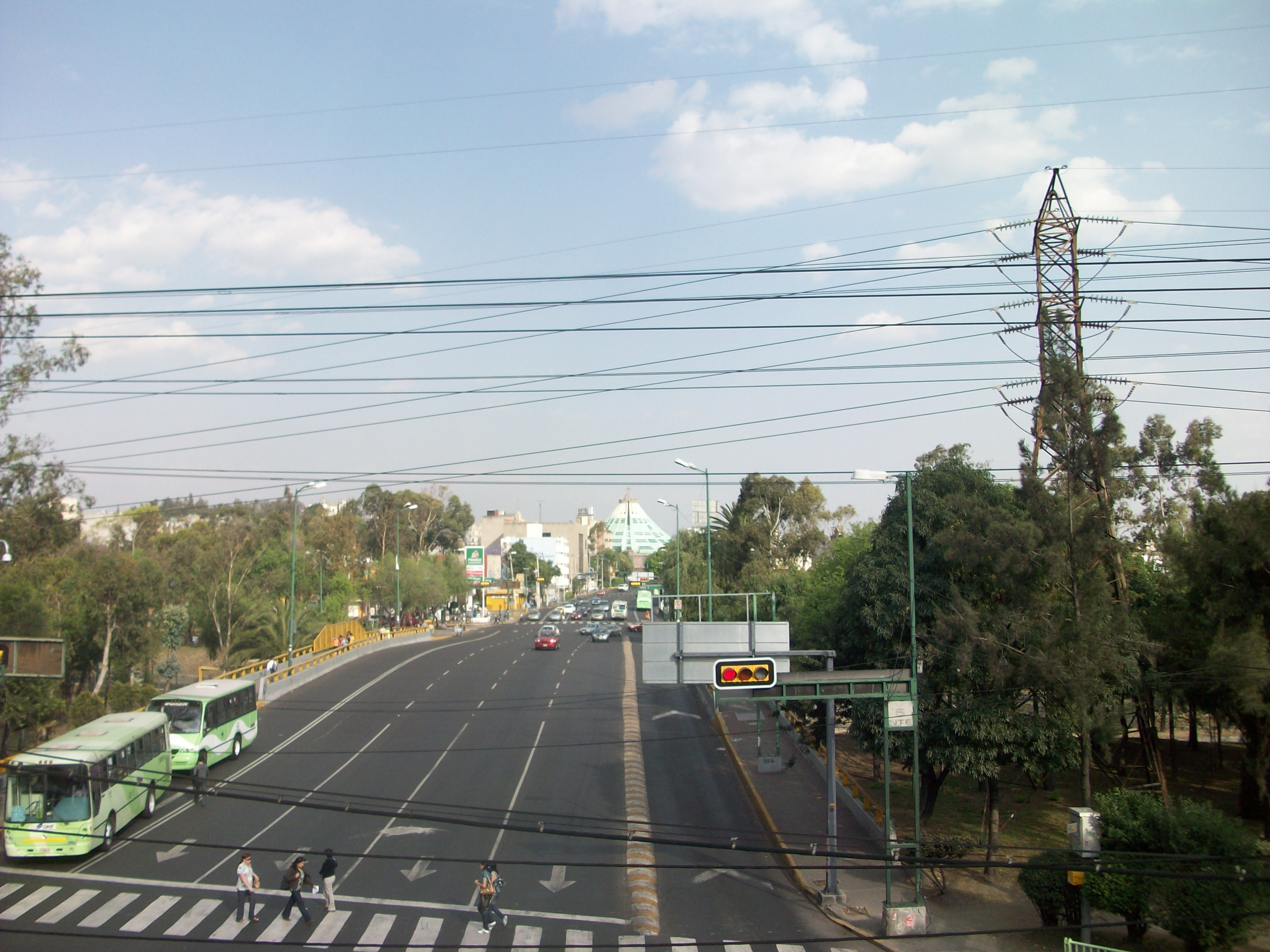
Eje 5 Norte Av. Montevideo

==== Eje 5 Norte ====
(Mostly east-to-west with counterflow lane, Metrobús line 6 (planned))

- Avenida 412 (From Av. Central / 608 to José Loreto Fabela)
- Río de Guadalupe (De Loreto Fabela to Calle Emiliano Zapata)
- Calz. San Juan de Aragón / Calz. de Aragón (From Emiliano Zapata to 5 de Febrero)
- Cantera (From 5 de Febrero/ Av. Gral. Martin Carrera to Misterios)
- Montevideo (From Misterios to Eje Central Av. de los 100 Metros)
- Poniente 140 (From Eje Central to Ceylán / Arena Ciudad de México)
- Deportivo Reynosa (From Ceylán to Andrés Henestrosa / Av. Ixtacala)
- Andrés Henestrosa (From Deportivo Reynosa to Av. de las Culturas)
- Avenida de las Culturas (From Ixtacala to Calz. de las Armas / Aquiles Serdán)

==== Eje 6 Norte ====
(Partially two-way)

- Cultura Romana (From Cultura Norte to Av. Maravillas)
- Poniente 152 (From Av. Maravillas to Eje 1 Pte Calz. Vallejo)
- Othón de Mendizábal / Las Torres (From Vallejo to Miguel Bernard)
- Miguel Bernard (From Othón de Mendizábal to Juan de Dios Bátiz)
- Juan de Dios Bátiz (From Miguel Bernard to Calzada Ticoman)
- Calzada Ticomán (From Juan de Dios Bátiz to Misterios / Cantera)
- Fray Sebastián de Aparicio (From Eje 1 and 2 Ote Av. Centenario to Eje 3 Ote Eduardo Molina)
- Avenida 306 (From Eje 3 Ote to Gran Canal)
- Villa de Ayala (From Gran Canal to Dolores Hidalgo)
- Francisco Villa (From Dolores Hidalgo to Avenida Central Carlos Hank González)

=== South (“Sur”) ===
==== Eje 1 and 1A Sur ====
(Two-way)

- Avenida Chapultepec (From Circuito Interior Melchor Ocampo to Eje 1 Pte Cuauhtémoc)
- Fray Servando Teresa de Mier (From Eje 1 Pte to Circuito Interior Blvd. Puerto Aéreo)
- Avenida 8 (From Blvd. Puerto Aéreo to Nezahualcóyotl, Estado de México)
- San Pablo (Oriente - Poniente) (From Eje 1 Ote Anillo de Circunvalación to Av. Pino Suárez)
- José María Izazaga (Oriente - Poniente) (From Pino Suárez to Eje Central)
- Arcos de Belén (From Eje Central to Eje 1 Pte Bucareli)

==== Eje 2 and 2A Sur ====
(West-to-east with counterflow lane)

Juan Escutia (From Circuito Interior José Vasconselos to Av. Tamaulipas)

- 'Av. Nuevo León' (From Av. Tamaulipas to Eje 3 Pte Salamanca, not part of the Eje Vial)
- 'Álvaro Obregón' (From Salamanca to Av. Yucatán)
- Yucatán (From Álvaro Obregón to Insurgentes / Medellín (This section serves as both Eje 2 Sur and Eje 3 Poniente)
- Querétaro (From Insurgentes to Eje 1 Pte Cuauhtémoc)
- Doctor Olvera (From Eje 1 Pte to Eje Central Lázaro Cárdenas)
- Manuel José Othón (From Eje Central to José Tomás Cuellar)
- Av. José Tomás Cuellar (From Manuel José Othón to Calz. San Antonio Abad)
- Av. del Taller (From Calzada San Antonio Abad to Av. Genaro García)

Eje 2A Sur

- San Luis Potosí (De Insurgentes to Eje 1 Pte Cuauhtémoc)
- Doctor Balmis (From Eje 1 Pte to Eje Central)
- Manuel Payno (From Eje Central to José Tomás Cuellar)

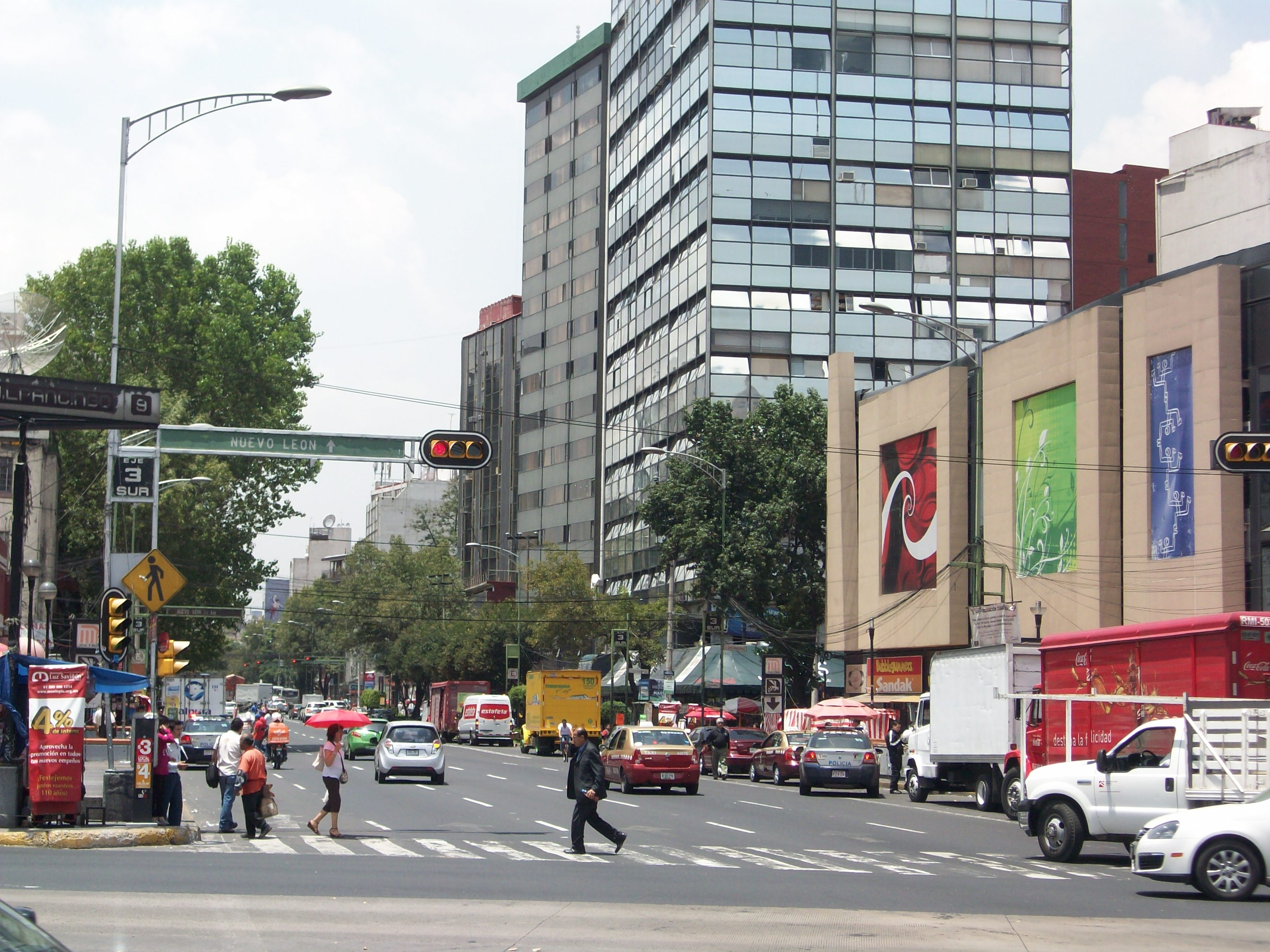
Eje 3 Sur Av. Baja California

==== Eje 3 Sur ====
(East-to-west with counterflow lane)

- Canal de Tezontle (From Anillo Periférico Canal de San Juan to Eje 5 Ote Javier Rojo Gómez. Considered to be Eje 3 and 4 Sur)
- Ferrocarril de Río Frio (From Eje 5 Ote to Circuito Interior Rio Churubusco)
- Vainilla (From Circuito Interior to Av. Canela)
- Añil (From Canela to Eje 3 Ote Azúcar)
- Morelos (From Eje 3 Ote to Eje 1 Ote La Viga)
- Calzada Chabacano (From Eje 1 Ote to Calz. San Antonio Abad)
- José Peón Contreras (From San Antonio Abad to Eje Central)
- Dr. Ignacio Morones Prieto (From Eje Central to Eje 1 Pte Cuauhtémoc)
- Baja California (From Eje 1 Pte to Benjamin Franklin)
- Benjamin Franklin (From Baja California to Circuito Interior Revolución. This section is considered also to be Eje 3 and 4 Sur)

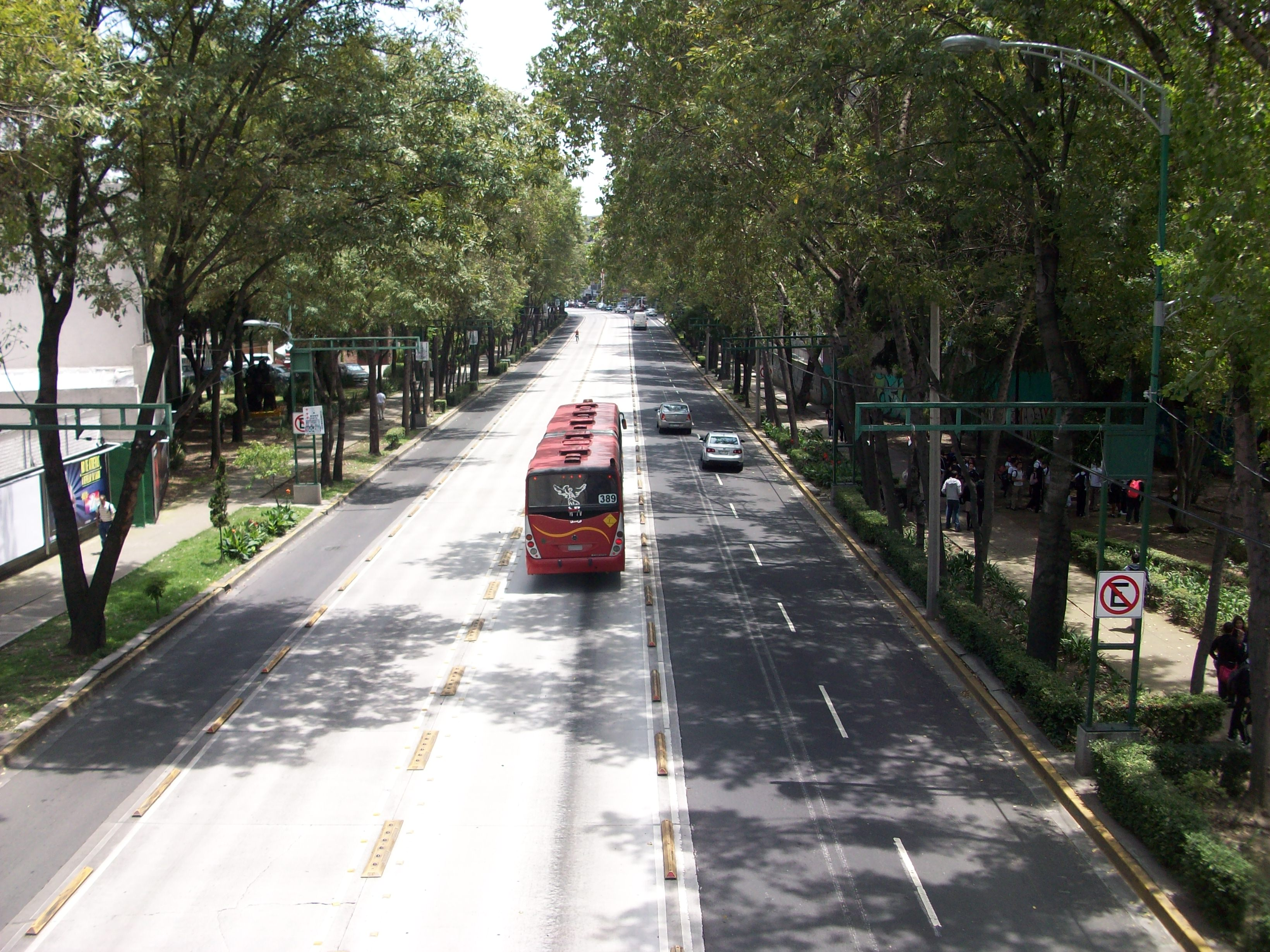
Eje 4 Sur Av. Rafael Dondé

==== Eje 4 Sur ====
(West-to-east artery with counterflow lane and Metrobús line 2)

- Benjamin Franklin (From Circuito Interior Revolución to Av. Nuevo León)
- Tehuantepec (From Nuevo León to Viaducto Miguel Alemán)
- Chilpancingo (From Insurgentes to Av. Coyoacán)
- Rafael Dondé (From Insurgentes to Xola)
- Xola (From Insurgentes to Calzada de Tlalpan)
- Napoleón (From Calzada de Tlalpan to Av. Presidente Plutarco Elías Calles)
- Av. Presidente Plutarco Elías Calles (From Av. Napoleón to Circuito Interior Rio Churubusco)
- Avenida Té (From Circuito Interior to Eje 4 Ote Canal de Churubusco)
- San Rafael Atlixco (From Eje 4 Ote to Av. Río Mayo)
- Prolongación Plutarco Elías Calles (From Av. Río Mayo to Eje 5 Ote Javier Rojo Gómez)
- Canal de Tezontle (From Eje 5 Ote to Anillo Periférico Canal de San Juan)

==== Eje 5 Sur ====
(East-to-west with reversible lane)

- Av. Las Torres (From Autopista México - Puebla to Vicente Guerrero)
- Av. Circunvalación (From Vicente Guerrero to Eje 7 Ote Av. Guelatao)
- Marcelino Buendía (From Eje 7 Ote to Anillo Periférico Canal de San Juan)
- Leyes de Reforma (From Anillo Periférico to Cazuelas)
- Abarrotes and Víveres (From Cazuelas to Circuito Interior Rio Churubusco)
- Santa María La Purísima (From Circuito Interior to Eje 2 Ote Calz. de la Viga)
- Playa Villa del Mar (From Eje 2 Ote to Av. Presidente Plutarco Elías Calles)
- Primero de Mayo (From Plutarco Elías Calles to Calzada de Tlalpan)
- Ramos Millán (From Calz. de Tlalpan to Eje Central)
- Eugenia (From Eje Central to Av. Colonia del Valle)
- Av. Colonia del Valle (From Eugenia to Insurgentes)
- San Antonio (From Insurgentes to Anillo Periférico Adolfo López Mateos)
- Prolongación San Antonio (From Anillo Periférico to Eje 5 Pte Alta Tensión. Este tramo funge como el Eje 5 and 6 Sur)

==== Eje 6 Sur ====
(West-to-east with reversible lane(s))

- Prolongación San Antonio (From Eje 5 Pte Alta Tensión to Anillo Periférico Adolfo López Mateos)
- Tintoreto (From Anillo Periférico to Holbein)
- Holbein (From Circuito Interior Revolución to Insurgentes)
- Ángel Urraza (From Insurgentes to Eje Central)
- Av. Independencia (From Eje Central to Calzada de Tlalpan)
- Av. Morelos (From Calzada de Tlalpan to Av. Presidente Plutarco Elías Calles)
- Playa Pie de la Cuesta (From Av. Presidente Plutarco Elías Calles to Eje 2 Ote Calz. La Viga)
- Cardiólogos (From Eje 2 Ote to Trabajadoras Sociales)
- Trabajadoras Sociales (From Cardiólogos to Eje 5 Ote Javier Rojo Gómez)
- Av. Jalisco (From Eje 5 Ote to Albarrada)
- Luis Méndez (From Albarrada to Av. Circunvalación)
- Av. Las Torres (From Av. Circunvalación to la Autopista México-Puebla)

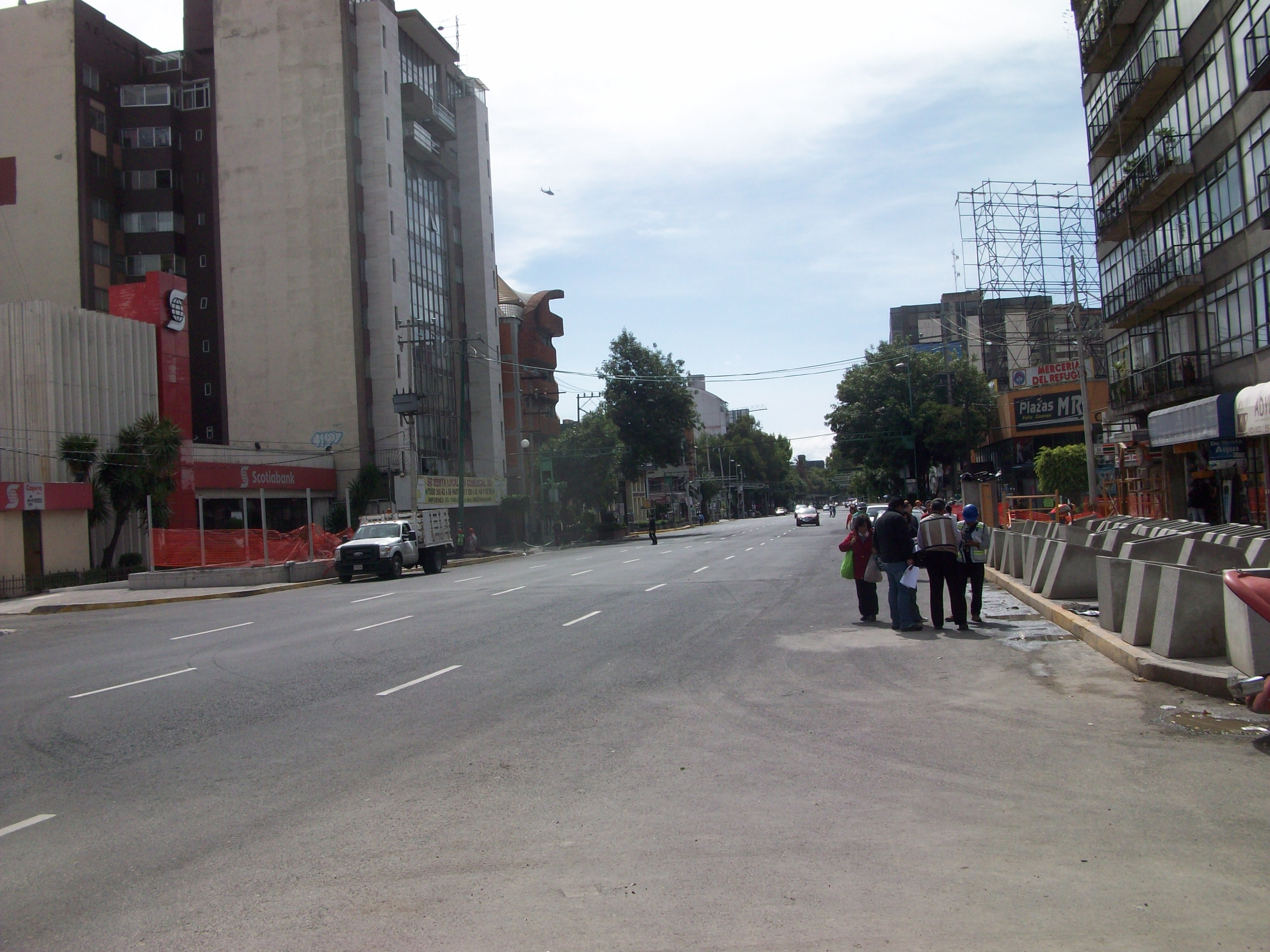
Eje 7 Sur Av. Felix Cuevas.

==== Eje 7 Sur ====
(mostly east-to-west with two-way on Zapata)

- Oriente 172 (From Circuito Interior Rio Churubusco to Calz. de Tlalpan)
- Zapata (From Calz. de Tlalpan to Av. Universidad)
- Félix Cuevas (From Av. Universidad to Insurgentes)
- Extremadura (From Insurgentes to Circuito Interior Revolución)

Eje 7A Sur

Municipio Libre' (From Av. Universidad to Circuito Interior Rio Churubusco)

==== Eje 8 Sur ====
(West-to-east and two-way)

- José María Rico (From Insurgentes / Circuito Interior Rio Mixcoac to Av. Universidad)
- Popocatépetl (From Av. Universidad to Calzada de Tlalpan)
- Calzada Ermita-Iztapalapa (From Calzada de Tlalpan to Calzada Ignacio Zaragoza / Carretera Federal México - Puebla)

==== Eje 9 Sur ====
(Fragmented two-way)

- Miguel Ángel de Quevedo (From Insurgentes to Calz. de Tlalpan)
- Taxqueña (From Calz. de Tlalpan to Canal Nacional)
- Av. Tláhuac (From Canal Nacional to Centro de Tláhuac. This section is considered Eje 9 and 10 Sur)
- Bilbao (From Miguel Hidalgo to Anillo Periférico Canal de Garay)

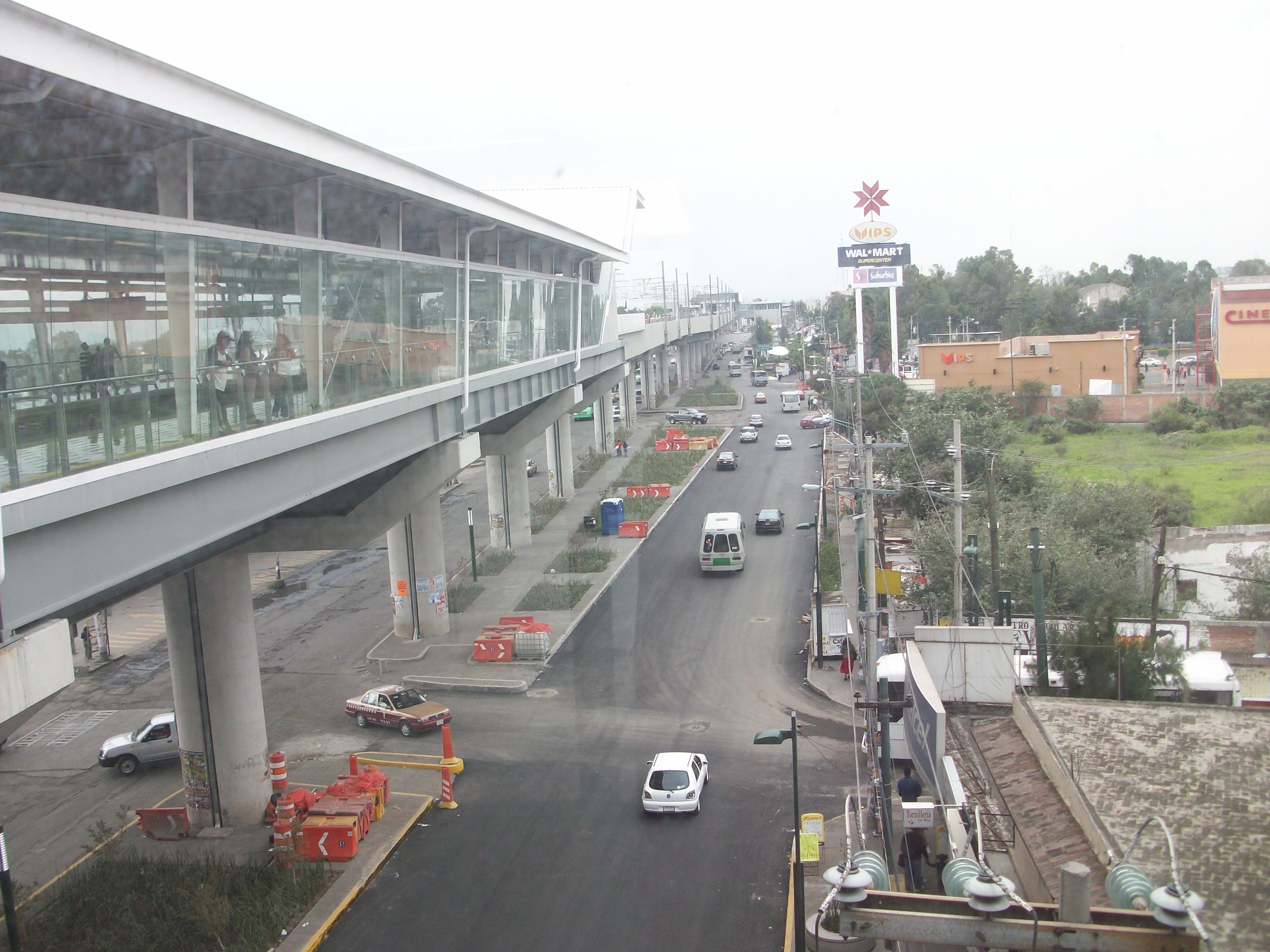
Eje 10 Sur Av. Tláhuac.

==== Eje 10 Sur ====
(East-to-west artery and two-way)

- Carretera Tlaltenco a la Mexico - Puebla (2 way)(From Carretera Federal México-Puebla to Calle 8)
- Calle 8 (From Carretera Tlatenco to Carretera a Santa Catarina)
- Carretera a Santa Catarina (From Calle 8 to Av. Pedro María Anaya)
- Independencia (From Carlos Vidal to Miguel Hidalgo)
- Av. Pedro María Anaya (Norte - Sur) & Monte de las Cordilleras (Sur - Norte) (From Carretera a Santa Catarina to Av. Ojo de Agua)
- Antonio Bejar (Pte - Ote) & Av. Ojo de Agua (Ote -Pte) (From Monte de las Cordilleras to Av. Tláhuac)
- Av. Miguel Hidalgo (From Av. Independencia to Av. Tláhuac)
- Av. Tláhuac (2 way)(From Av. Ojo de Agua to Calz. la Virgen)
- Calzada de la Virgen (2 way) (From Canal Nacional to Calz. de Tlalpan)
- Pedro Henríquez Ureña (2 way) (From Eje Central Avenida Aztecas to Antonio Delfín Madrigal)
- Copilco (2 way)(From Antonio Delfín Madrigal to Universidad. )
- Copilco (East - West) (From Universidad to Insurgentes)
- Rio de La Magdalena (East-West) (From Insurgentes to Fraternidad)
- Canoa (East-West) (From Fraternidad to Av. San Jerónimo)
- San Jerónimo (East-West) (From Canoa to Anillo Periférico Adolfo Ruiz Cortínez / Ruta de la Amistad)
- San Jerónimo (West-East) (From Anillo Periférico Adolfo Ruiz Cortínez / Ruta de la Amistad to Insurgentes)
- Universidad (East-West) (From Insurgentes to Copilco)

=== East (“Oriente”) ===
==== Eje 1 Oriente ====
(Mostly north-to-south)

- Via Morelos (In Ecatepec, State of Mexico, not considered part of the Eje Vial)
- Av. Centenario (From Anillo Periférico Rio de los Remedios to Av. Martin Carrera (En este tramo, este es el Eje 1 and 2 Oriente))
- Ferrocarril Hidalgo (From Av. Martin Carrera to Circuito Interior Rio Consulado),
- Boleo (From Rio Consulado to Eje 2 Norte (Canal del Norte)),
- Av. del Trabajo (De Canal del Norte a Eje 1 Norte (Avenida Héroe de Granaditas)),
- Vidal Alcocer (From Eje 1 Norte to República de Guatemala),
- Anillo de Circunvalación (From República de Guatemala to Eje 1 Sur (Fray Servando)),
- Calzada de la Viga (From Fray Servando to Viaducto Rio de la Piedad),
- Av. Andrés Molina Enríquez (From Viaducto Rio de la Piedad to Circuito Interior Rio Churubusco),
- Av. Vía Láctea (Norte-Sur) / Cerro de las Torres (Sur-Norte) (From Rio Churubusco to Canal Nacional),
- Av. de las Torres (From Canal Nacional to Canal de Miramontes) y
- Canal de Miramontes (From Circuito Interior Rio Churubusco and Av. de las Torres to Anillo Periférico / Glorieta de Vaqueritos (From el tramo en el que Canal de Miramontes se une con Av. Escuela Naval Militar, se convierte en el Eje 1 and 2 Oriente)

==== Eje 2 Oriente ====
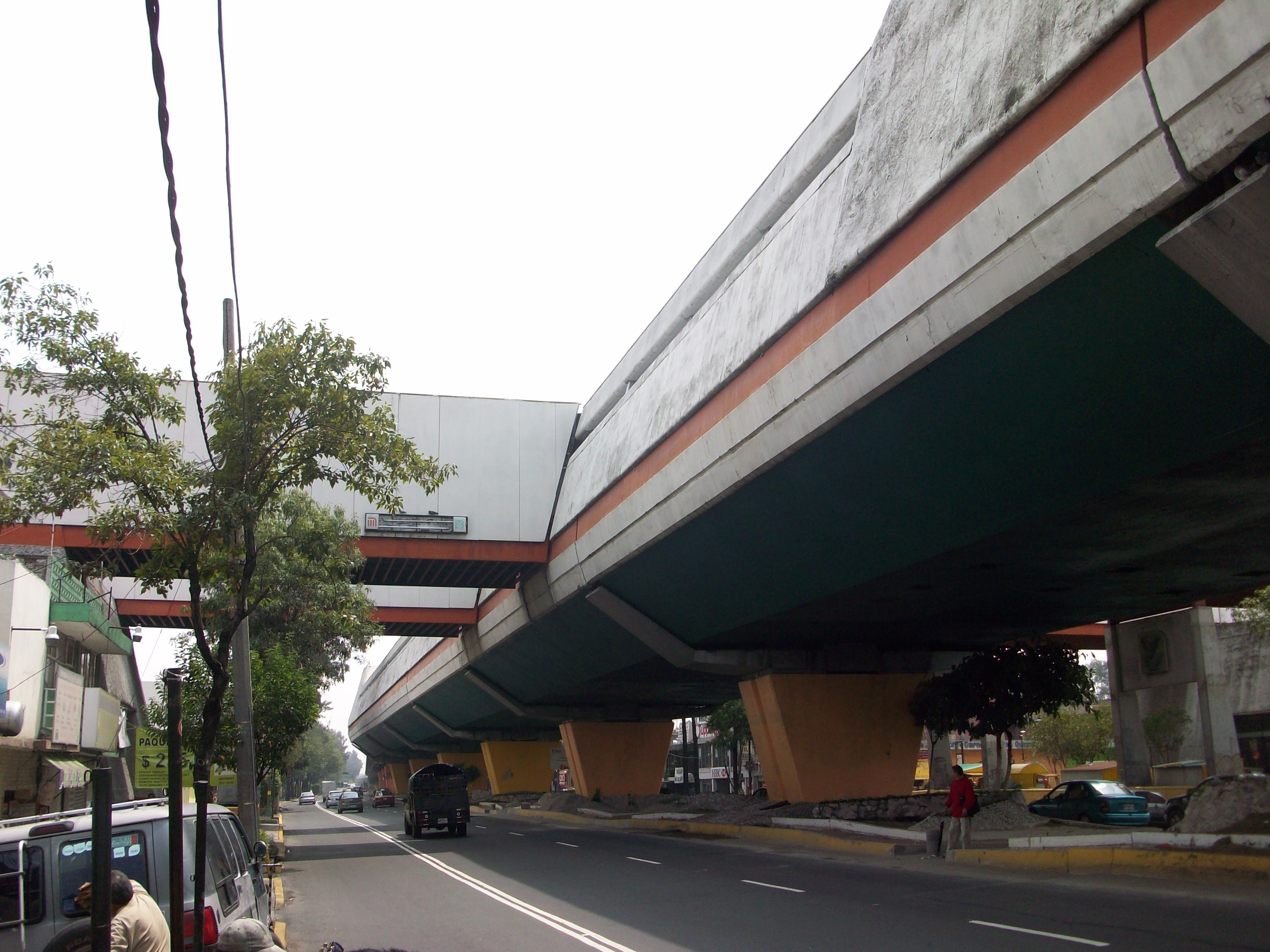
Eje 2 Oriente Av. Congreso de la Unión.

(Mostly south-to-north)

- Canal de Miramontes (Eje 1 and 2 Oriente) (De Glorieta de Vaqueritos / Anillo Periférico a Escuela Naval Militar)
- Heroica Escuela Naval Militar (From Canal de Miramontes to Canal Nacional)
- Calzada de la Viga (From Canal Nacional to Eje 2 Sur (Av. del Taller)
- Congreso de la Unión / Inguarán (From Eje 4 Sur (Plutarco Elias Calles) to Eje 5 Norte (Calzada San Juan de Aragón))
- Av. Centenario (Eje 1 and 2 Oriente) (To Anillo Periférico Rio de los Remedios)

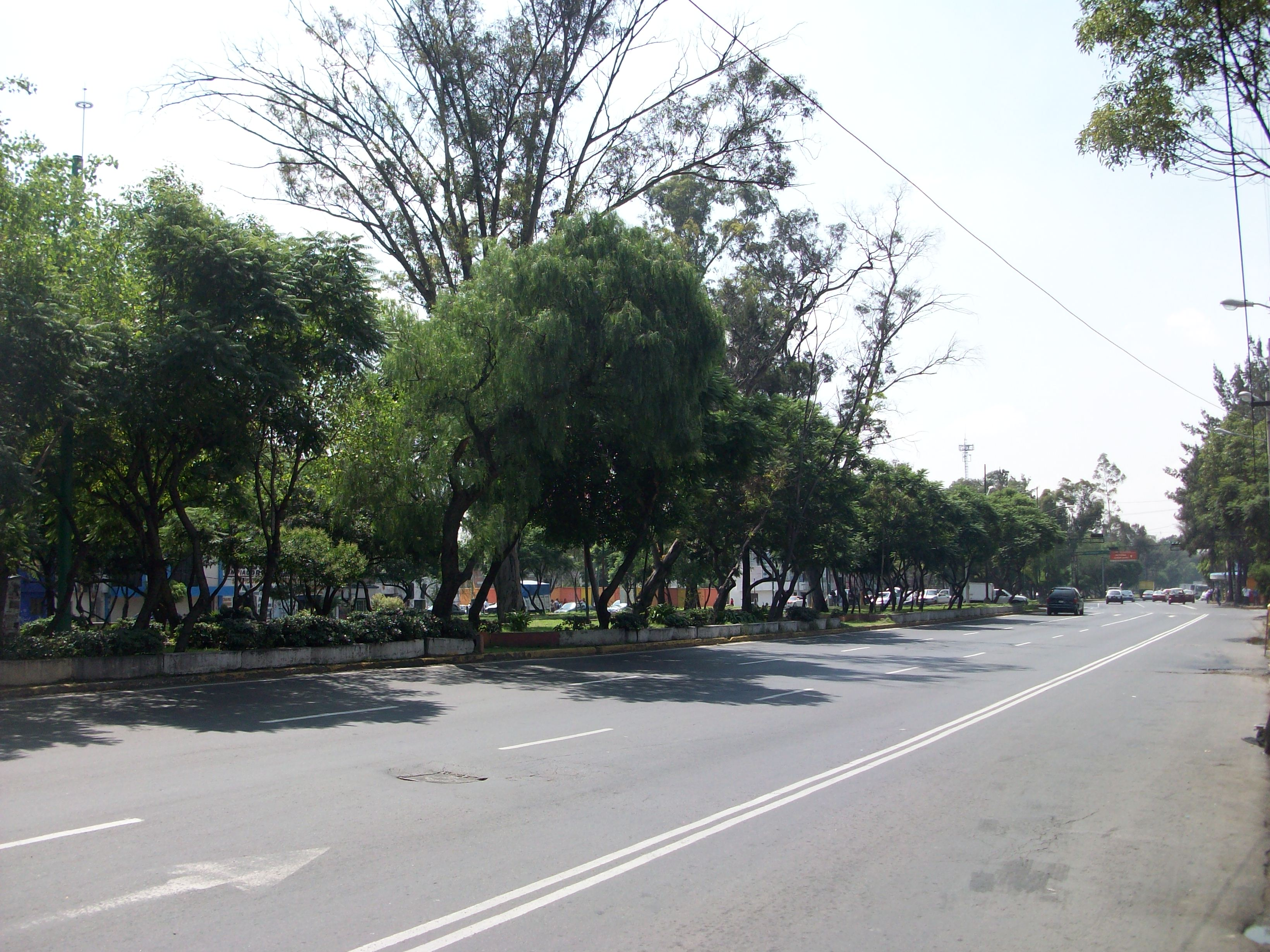
Eje 3 Oriente Av. Ingeniero Eduardo Molina.

==== Eje 3 Oriente ====
(Two-way, Metrobús line 5 planned)

- Av. Ing. Eduardo Molina (From Anillo Periférico Rio de los Remedios to Calz. Ignacio Zaragoza)
- Francisco del Paso and Troncoso (From Ignacio Zaragoza to Viaducto Rio de la Piedad)
- Azúcar (From Viaducto Rio de la Piedad to Eje 4 Sur (Plutarco Elías Calles))
- Francisco del Paso and Troncoso (From Eje 4 Sur to Eje 6 Sur (Trabajadoras Sociales))
- Geógrafos (From Eje 6 Sur a Circuito Interior Rio Churubusco)
- Avenida 5 (From Rio Churubusco to Eje 8 Sur (Calzada Ermita-Iztapalapa))
- Av. Arneses / Prolongación Arneses (From Eje 8 Sur to Canal Nacional / Eje 9 Sur (Taxqueña))
- Av. Carlota Armero (From Taxqueña to Calzada La Virgen / Eje 10 Sur)
- Av. Armada de México (From La Virgen a Rancho Vista Hermosa)
- Cafetales (From Rancho Vista Hermosa to Anillo Periférico Adolfo Ruiz Cortinez)

==== Eje Troncal Metropolitano ====
Eje 3 Oriente forms part of the “Eje Troncal Metropolitano” connecting Ecatepec with Xochimilco in southeast Mexico City, along:

- Avenida Central (Carlos Hank González, en el Estado de México (From Carretera Federal Lechería to Eje 5 Norte (Avenida 412))
- Avenida 608 (From Eje 5 Norte to Circuito Interior (Rio Consulado))
- Av. Oceanía (From Circuito Interior to incorporarse con el Eje 3 Oriente hacia el sur a partir de Francisco del Paso and Troncoso mediante el distribuidor vial Heriberto Castillo)

==== Eje 4 Oriente ====
(Two-way)

- Av. Canal Río Churubusco (From Circuito Interior Rio Churubusco & Eje 6 Sur to Anillo Periférico Calle 7)
- Prolongación Río Churubusco (From Calle Prosperidad to Vía Express Tapo / Av. Bordo de Xochiaca)

==== Eje 5 Oriente ====
(Two-way)

- Av. Central (From Eje 1 Norte (Talleres Gráficos) to Calz. Ignacio Zaragoza)
- Av. Javier Rojo Gómez (From Calz. Ignacio Zaragoza to Eje 8 Sur Calz. Ermita-Iztapalapa)

==== Eje 6 Oriente ====
(North-to-south, non-continuous)

- Calle 4 (From Av. Prosperidad to Calz. Ignacio Zaragoza)
- Oriente 253 (From Calz. Ignacio Zaragoza to Eje 3 Sur Ferrocarril de Río Frío)
- Guerra de Reforma (From Eje 4 Sur (Canal de Tezontle) to Canal del Moral)

==== Eje 7 Oriente ====
(Two-way)

- Av. Adolfo López Mateos / Av. Juan Crisóstomo Bonilla (From Av. Bordo de Xochiaca to Calz. Ignacio Zaragoza, in Nezahualcóyotl, State of Mexico, not considered an Eje Vial)
- Av. Guelatao (From Calzada Ignacio Zaragoza to Av. Santa Cruz Meyehualco)
- Calle 39 (From Av. Santa Cruz Meyehualco to Eje 8 Sur Calz. Ermita-Iztapalapa)

=== West (“Poniente”) ===
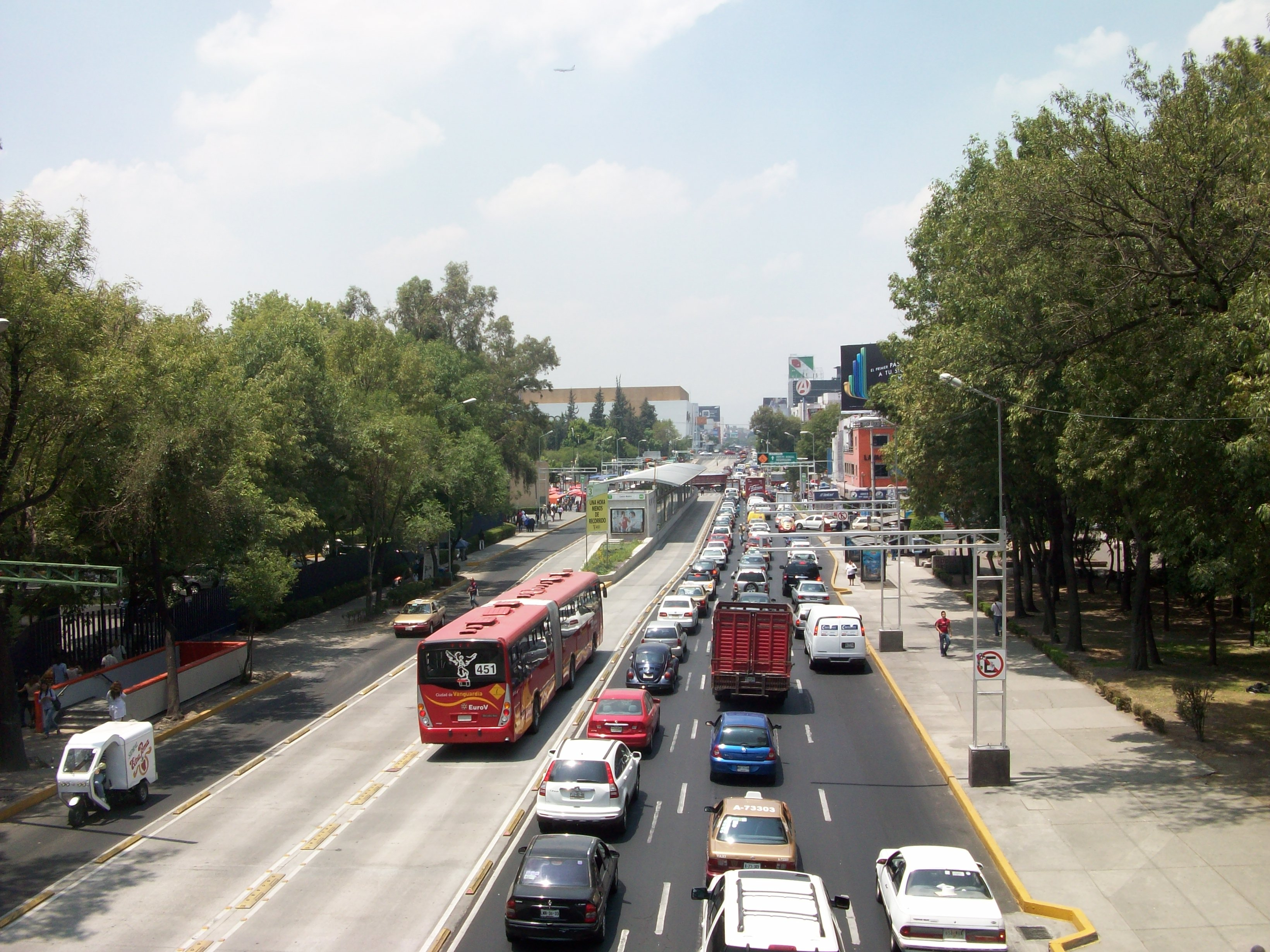
Eje 1 Poniente Av. Cuauhtémoc.

==== Eje 1 Poniente ====
(North-to-south with counterflow lane and Metrobús line 3)

- Calzada Vallejo (From Anillo Periférico Acueducto de Tenayuca to Circuito Interior Rio Consulado)
- Guerrero (From Circuito Interior to México - Tenochtitlan)
- Rosales (From México - Tenochtitlan to Paseo de la Reforma)
- Bucareli (From Paseo de la Reforma to Eje 1 Sur (Av. Chapultepec)
- Cuauhtémoc (from Av. Chapultepec to Eje 8 Sur (Popocatépetl))
- Av. México-Coyoacán (From Popocatépetl to Circuito Interior Rio Churubusco)

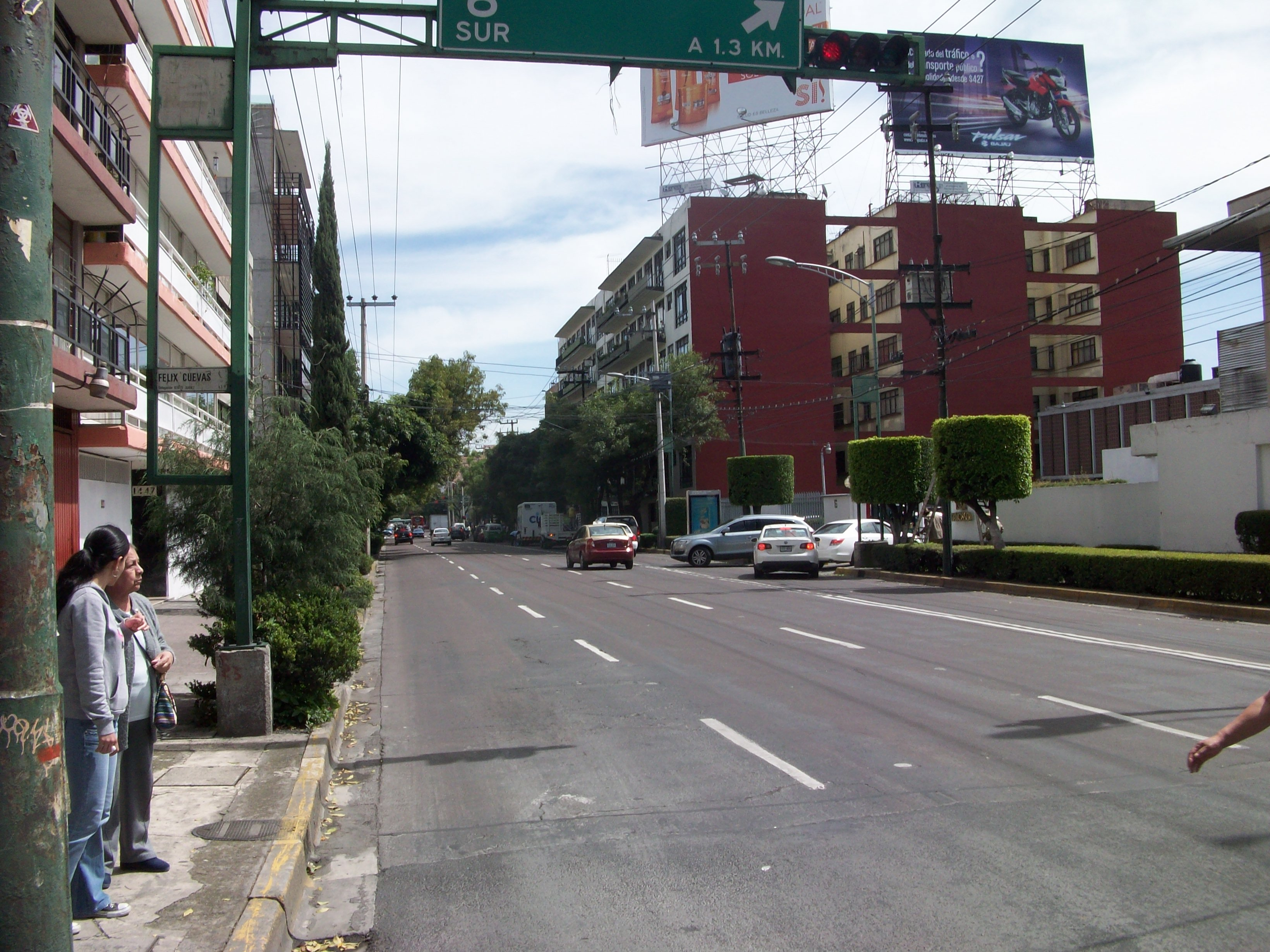
Eje 2 Poniente Av. Gabriel Mancera

==== Eje 2 Poniente ====
(South-to-north)

- Gabriel Mancera (From Av. Universidad to Viaducto Miguel Alemán)
- Monterrey (From Viaducto Miguel Alemán to Eje 1 Sur (Av. Chapultepec))
- Florencia (From Av. Chapultepec to Paseo de la Reforma)
- Rio Tíber (From Paseo de la Reforma to Circuito Interior Melchor Ocampo)

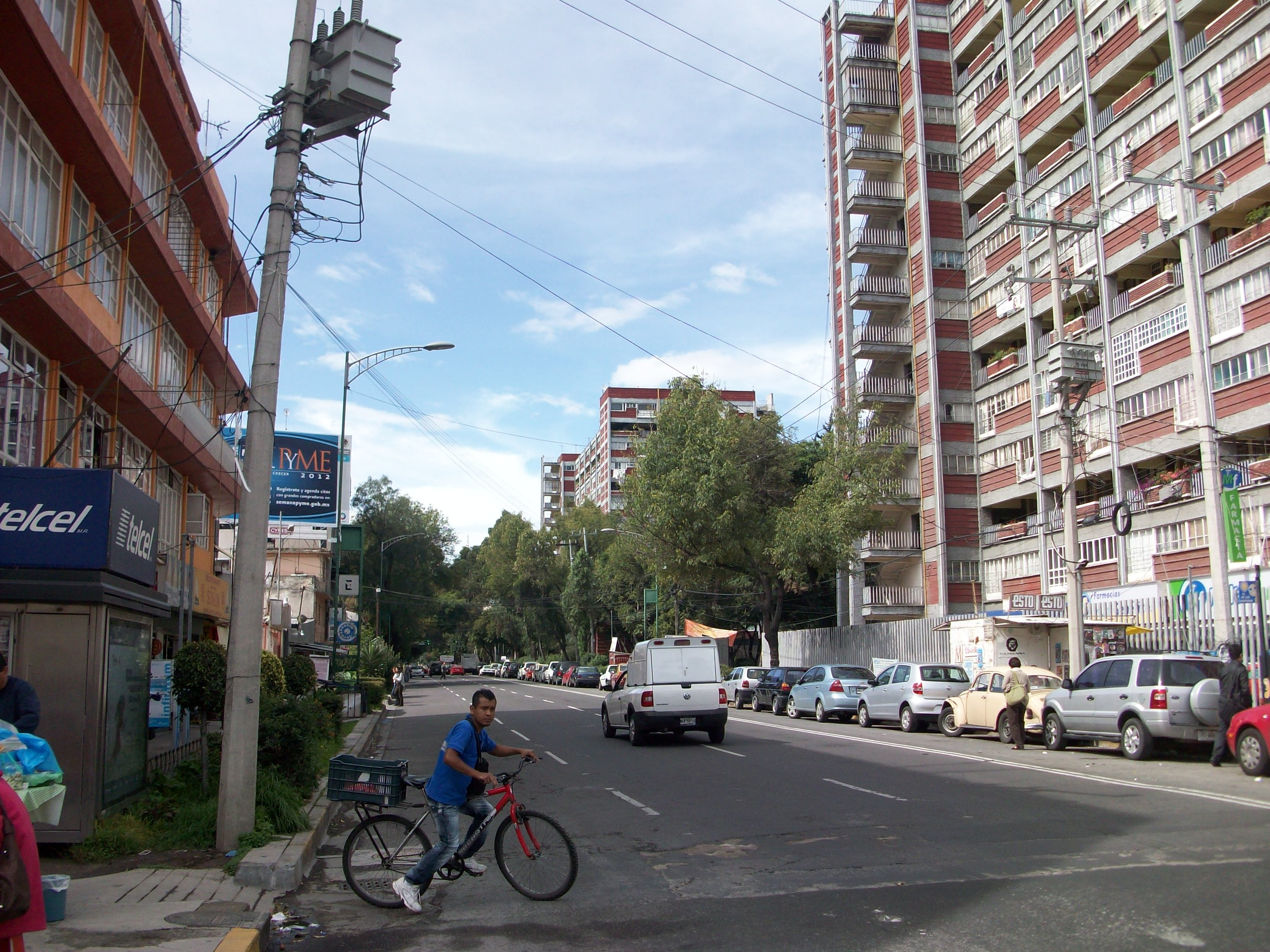
Eje 3 Poniente Av. Coyoacán

==== Eje 3 Poniente ====
(North-to-south)

- Thiers (From Ejercito Nacional Mexicano to Circuito Interior Melchor Ocampo)
- Rio Mississippi (From Circuito Interior to Paseo de la Reforma)
- Sevilla (From Paseo de la Reforma to Eje 1 Sur (Av. Chapultepec))
- Salamanca (From Av. Chapultepec to Álvaro Obregón)
- Yucatán (From Av. Álvaro Obregón to Insurgentes, este tramo funge como el Eje 3 Poniente and Eje 2 Sur)
- Medellín (From Eje 1 Sur (Av. Chapultepec) to Av. Obrero Mundial),
- Amores (From Av. Obrero Mundial to División del Norte / Glorieta de Riviera)
- Av. Coyoacán (From Av. Colonia del Valle to Circuito Interior Rio Churubusco)

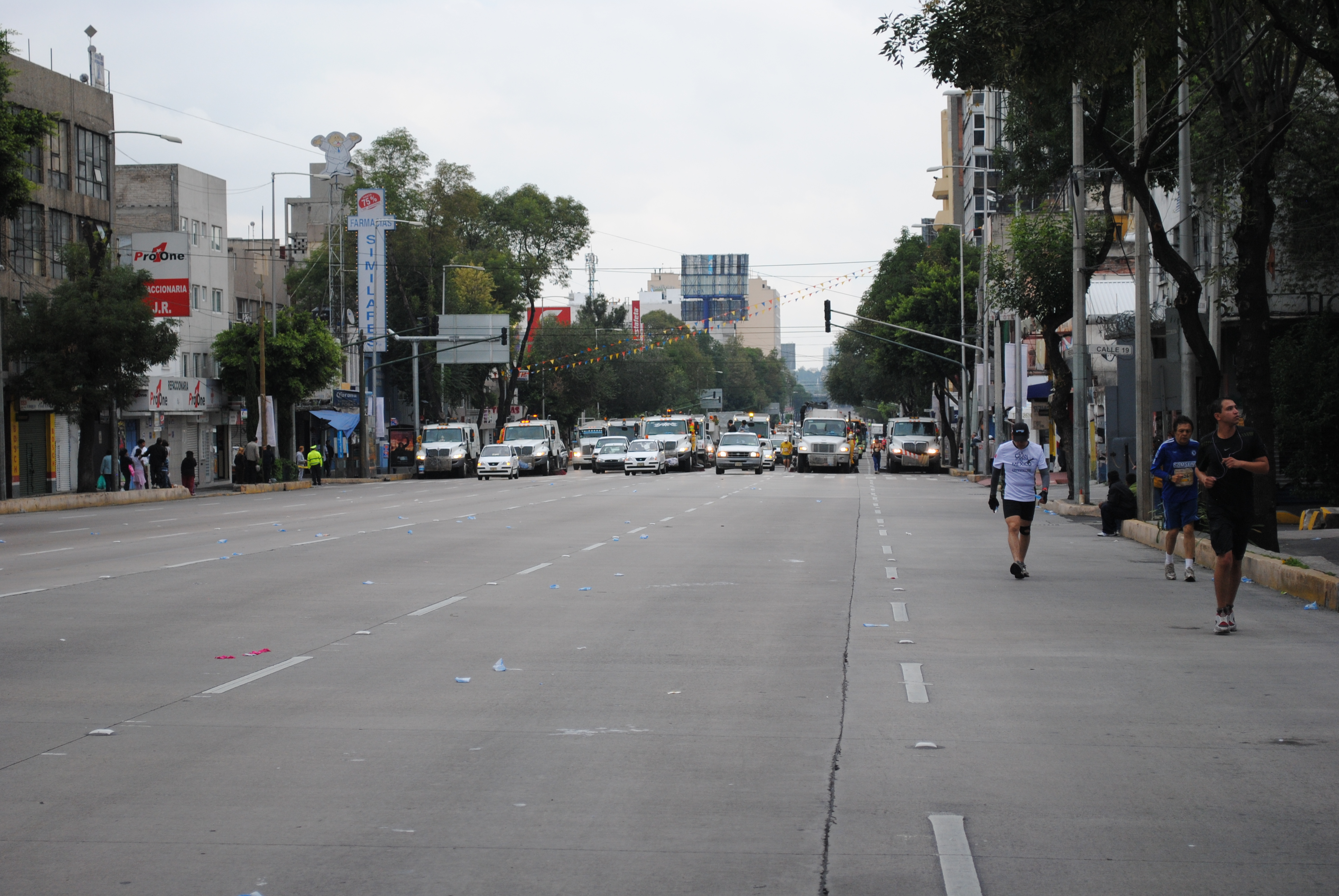
Eje 4 Poniente Av. Revolución

==== Eje 4 Poniente ====
(Two-way)

- Calzada Gral. Mariano Escobedo (From Ejercito Nacional Mexicano to Circuito Interior Melchor Ocampo / Paseo de la Reforma)
- Circuito Interior José Vasconcelos (From Paseo de la Reforma to Eje 3 and 4 Sur (Benjamín Franklin))
- Revolución (From Eje 3 and 4 Sur (Benjamín Franklin) to Via Escolar C.U.)

El tramo Revolución tiene sentido Norte - Sur de Benjamin Franklin a Circuito Interior Río Mixcoac, and posteriormente two-way.

==== Eje 4-A Poniente ====
- Patriotismo (Sur - Norte) (From Circuito Interior Rio Mixcoac to Circuito Interior José Vasconcelos)

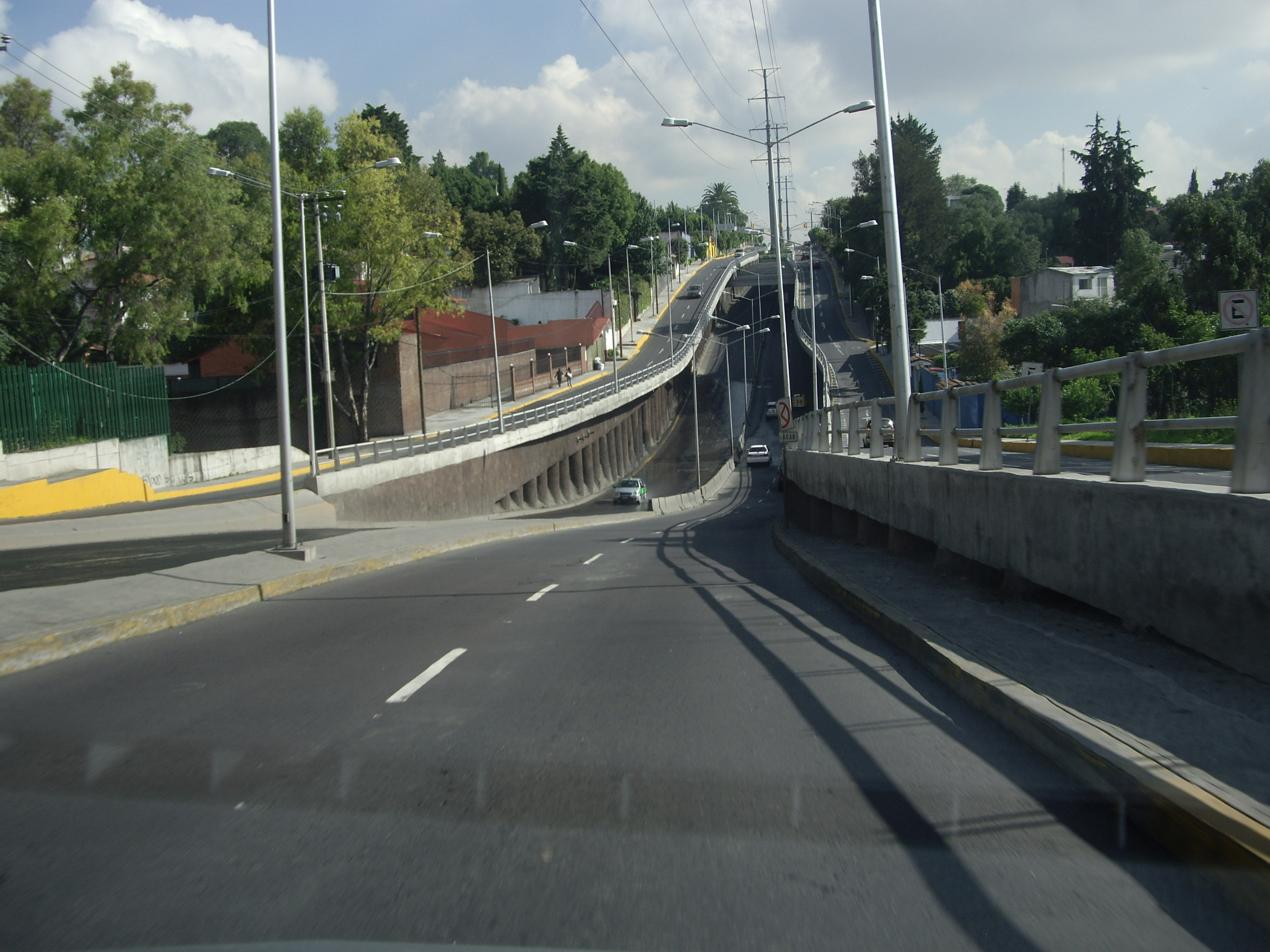
Eje 5 Poniente Av. Alta Tensión.

==== Eje 5 Poniente ====
(Two-way)

- Camino de los Toros (Sur - Norte) (From Constituyentes to Av. Observatorio)

(Sur 128 funge como su vialidad auxiliar sentido Norte - Sur)

- Sur 122 (From Av. Observatorio to Av. Camino Real a Toluca)
- Escuadrón 201 (From Av. Camino Real a Toluca to Av. Central)
- Av. Central (From Av. Escuadrón 201 to Eje 5 and 6 Sur (Prolongación San Antonio))
- Alta Tensión (From Prolongación San Antonio to Av. Centenario)
- Av. Alfonso Caso Andrade (From Av. Centenario to Rómulo O'Farril)

==== Eje 6 Poniente ====
(Non-continuous two-way)

- San Pedro Xalpa (From Eje 6 Norte (Av. Cultura Romana) to Av. Miguel Hidalgo)
- 22 de Febrero (From Eje 4 Norte (Calz. Azcapotzalzo-La Villa) to Eje 3 Norte (Calz. Camarones))

==== Eje 7 Poniente ====
(Two-way)

- Puente de Guerra (From Av. El Rosario to Zempoaltecas)
