= Tlaltenco metro station =

Mexico City Metro station

Tlaltenco
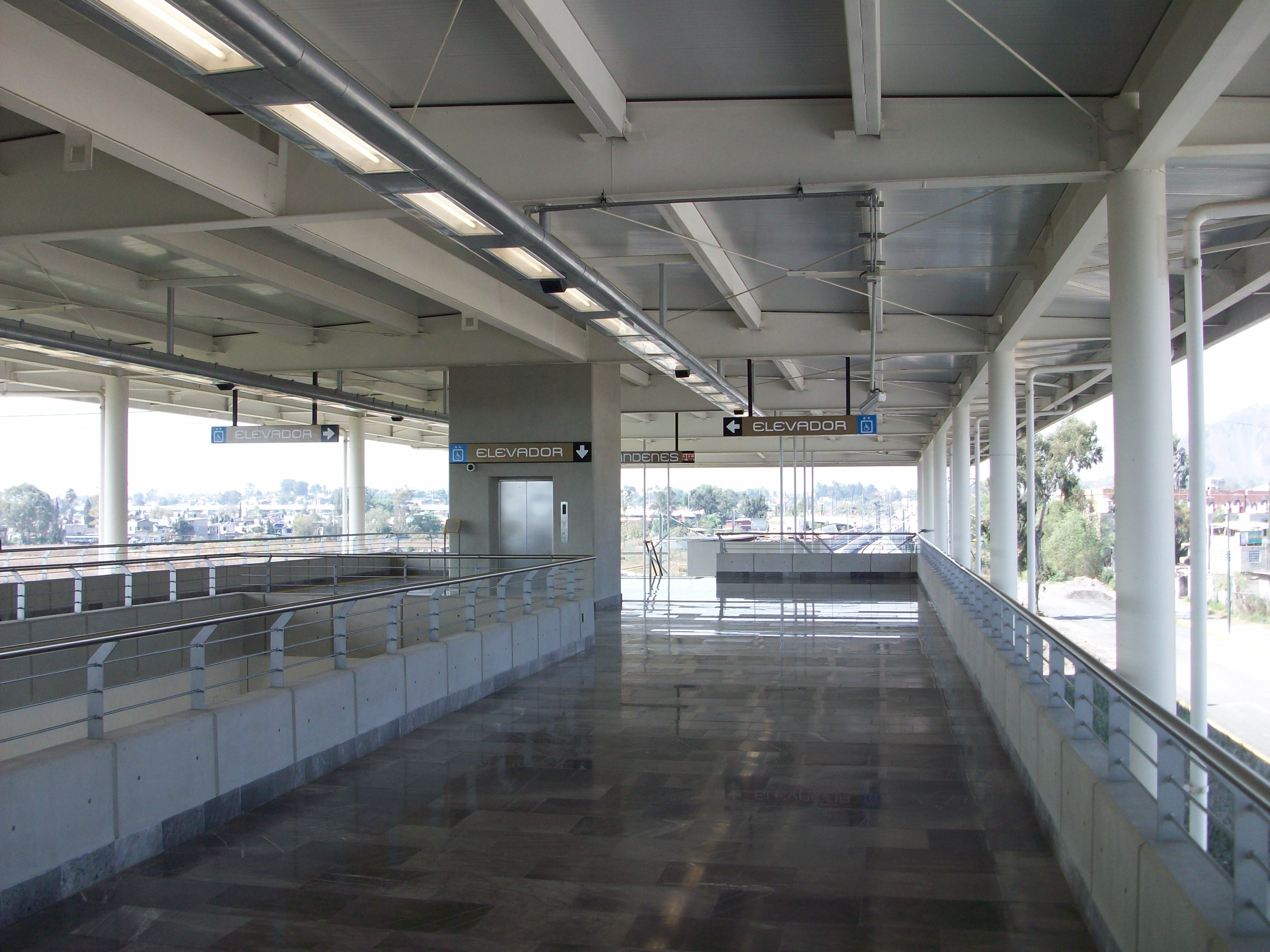
- Mezzanine, 2012

General information
- Location: Canal del Acalote; Tláhuac, Mexico City; Mexico
- Coordinates: 19.294380°N 99.024104°W
- System: Mexico City Metro
- Owner: Government of Mexico City
- Operator: Sistema de Transporte Colectivo (STC)
- Platforms: 1 island platform
- Tracks: 2

Construction
- Structure type: At grade
- Accessible: Yes

Other information
- Status: In service

History
- Opened: 30 October 2012; 14 years ago

Key dates
- 12 March 2014; 12 years ago: Temporarily closed
- 29 November 2015; 10 years ago: Reopened
- 19 September 2017; 9 years ago: Temporarily closed
- 30 October 2017; 9 years ago: Reopened
- 23 April 2020; 6 years ago: Temporarily closed
- 28 June 2020; 6 years ago: Reopened
- 3 May 2021; 5 years ago: Temporarily closed
- 30 January 2024; 2 years ago: Reopened

Passengers
- 2025: 1,674,428 (Note: The data here is limited to the most recent ten years to avoid excessive listings; earlier figures can be found in this page's history or on the Mexico City Metro website. To calculate the average daily ridership, the annual total is divided by 365 days (366 in leap years), with decimals omitted from the result. Each station per line is ranked individually, as the system counts transfer stations separately. The percentage change is calculated automatically using the data from the current year and the previous year.) ▲29.42%
- Rank: 182/195

Services
Preceding station	Mexico City Metro	Following station
Zapotitlán toward Mixcoac	Line 12	Tláhuac Terminus
Route map
Location
- Location within Mexico City urban area
- Area map

Tlaltenco metro station (Note: Estación del Metro Tlaltenco. Spanish pronunciation: [tlalˈteŋko]. The etymology comes from the Nahuatl language, "on the edge of the ground" or "on the edge of the hills".) is a Mexico City Metro station in Tláhuac, Mexico City. It is an at-grade station with one island platform, served by Line 12 (the Golden Line), between Zapotitlán and Tláhuac metro stations. Tlaltenco metro station serves the town of San Francisco Tlaltenco, from which it receives its name. The station's pictogram features a stone gateway known as La Puerta (lit. transl. "the Gateway"). The station was opened on 30 October 2012, on the first day of the Mixcoac–Tláhuac service.

The facilities are accessible to people with disabilities as there are elevators, tactile pavings and braille signage plates. In 2019, the station had an average daily ridership of 3,492 passengers, making it the 192nd busiest station in the network and the least busy of the line. Since it was opened, Tlaltenco metro station has had multiple incidents, including a 20-month closure in 2014 due to structural faults found in the elevated section of the line, a closure caused by the 19 September 2017 earthquake, and the subsequent collapse of the track near Olivos station in 2021.

== Location ==
Tlaltenco is a metro station along Canal del Acalote Avenue, in the Tláhuac borough, in southeastern Mexico City. The station serves San Francisco Tlaltenco, a town in the borough. Within the system, the station lies between Zapotitlán and Tláhuac metro stations.

=== Exits ===
There are two exists:

- Northeast: Canal del Acalote Avenue and Victoria Street, San Francisco Tlaltenco.
- Northwest: Canal del Acalote Avenue and Zacatenco Street, San Francisco Tlaltenco.

== History and construction ==
Line 12 of the Mexico City Metro was built by Empresas ICA, in association with Alstom Mexicana and Grupo Carso. Tlaltenco and Tláhuac stations were built at grade, and the track goes from the street level to the overground level between the Tlaltenco–Zapotitlán interstation; the Tlaltenco–Tláhuac section is 1,298 meters (4,259 ft) long, while the Tlaltenco–Zapotitlán stretch measures 1,115 meters (3,658 ft).

The station was opened on 30 October 2012, on the first day of the Mixcoac–Tláhuac service. The facilities are accessible to people with disabilities as there are elevators, tactile pavings and braille signage plates. The pictogram represents a stone gateway located in the town. Known as La Puerta de Tlaltenco (lit. transl. Tlaltenco's Gateway), the landmark was formerly used as a customs point to control the transit of goods.

=== Incidents ===
Since 2010, the Superior Auditor of the Federation has audited Line 12 several times and has reported several faults – like cracks and detachments – along the line, including some inside Tlaltenco metro station and at the Tlaltenco–Tláhuac interstation.

From 12 March 2014 to 29 November 2015, Tlaltenco was closed due to technical and structural faults in the stretch Atlalilco–Tláhuac. On 28 August 2017, a passenger jumped to the tracks and survived. He was in a state of intoxication and was fined $400,000 pesos. After the 19 September 2017 earthquake damaged Line 12 tracks, Tlaltenco remained closed until 30 October 2017. The earthquake derailed a train in the Tlaltenco–Zapotitlán overpass. From 23 April to 28 June 2020, the station was temporarily closed due to the COVID-19 pandemic in Mexico. On 3 May 2021, Tlaltenco metro station was closed after a portion of Line 12's elevated railway collapsed near Olivos station.

=== Ridership ===
According to the data provided by the authorities, the Tlaltenco metro station has been one of the least busy stations of the system's 195 stations. Except for the years when the station was closed for several months, commuters have averaged per year between 2,100 and 3,500 daily entrances. In 2019, before the impact of the COVID-19 pandemic on public transport, the station's ridership totaled 1,274,784 passengers, which was an increase of 155,870 passengers compared to 2018. In the same year, Tlaltenco was the 192nd busiest of the system and it was the least used of the line.

Annual passenger ridership
Year	Ridership	Average daily	Rank	% change	Ref.
2025	1,674,428	4,587	182/195	+29.42%	
2024	1,293,829	3,535	179/195	NA	
2023	0	0	188/195	NA	
2022	0	0	176/195	−100.00%	
2021	301,594	826	195/195	−61.05%	
2020	774,267	2,115	192/195	−39.26%	
2019	1,274,784	3,492	192/195	+13.93%	
2018	1,118,914	3,065	193/195	+24.49%	
2017	898,824	2,462	193/195	+3.93%	
2016	864,854	2,362	194/195	+1,165.65%	

== Gallery ==
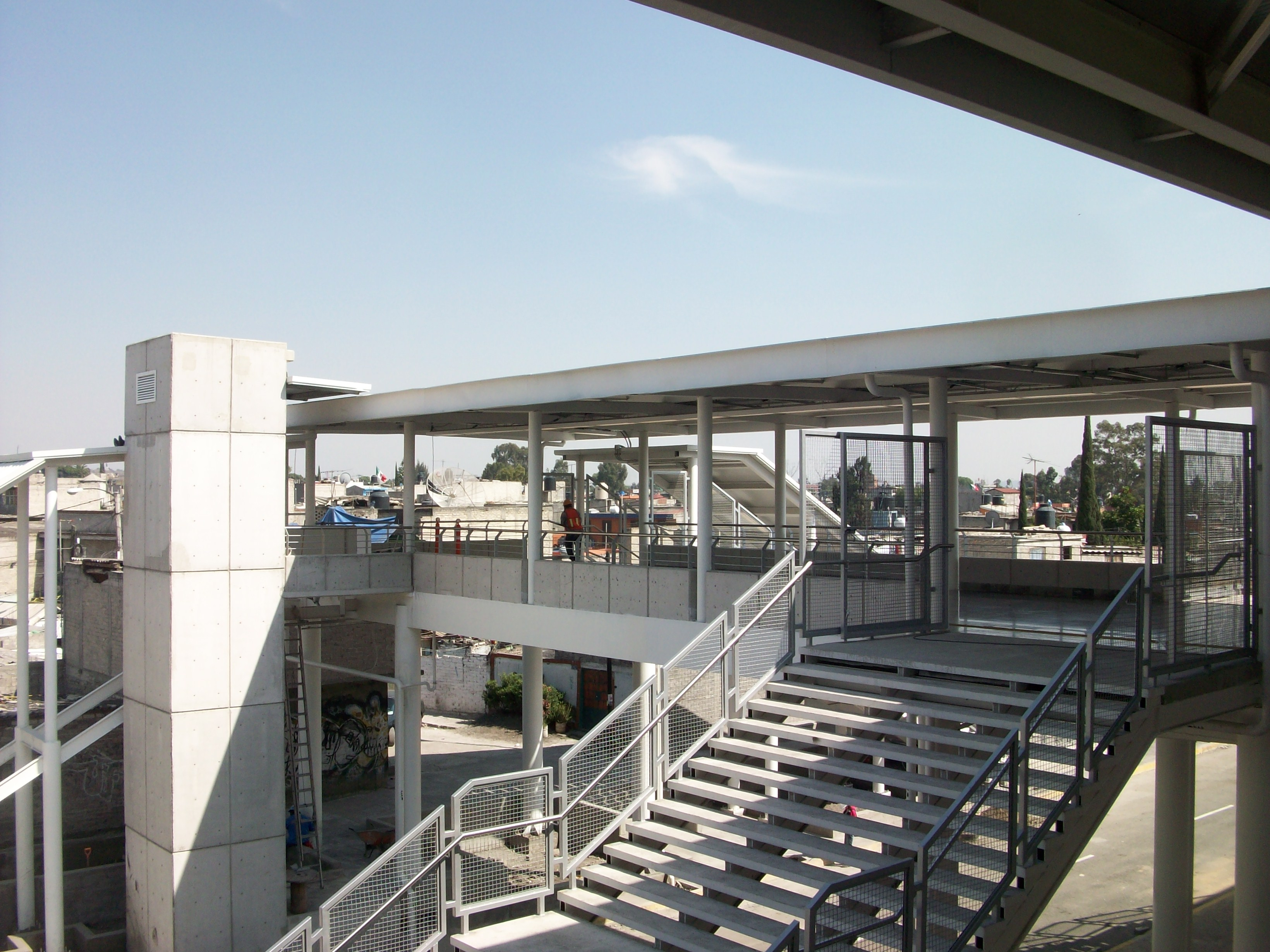
View of the entrance in 2012

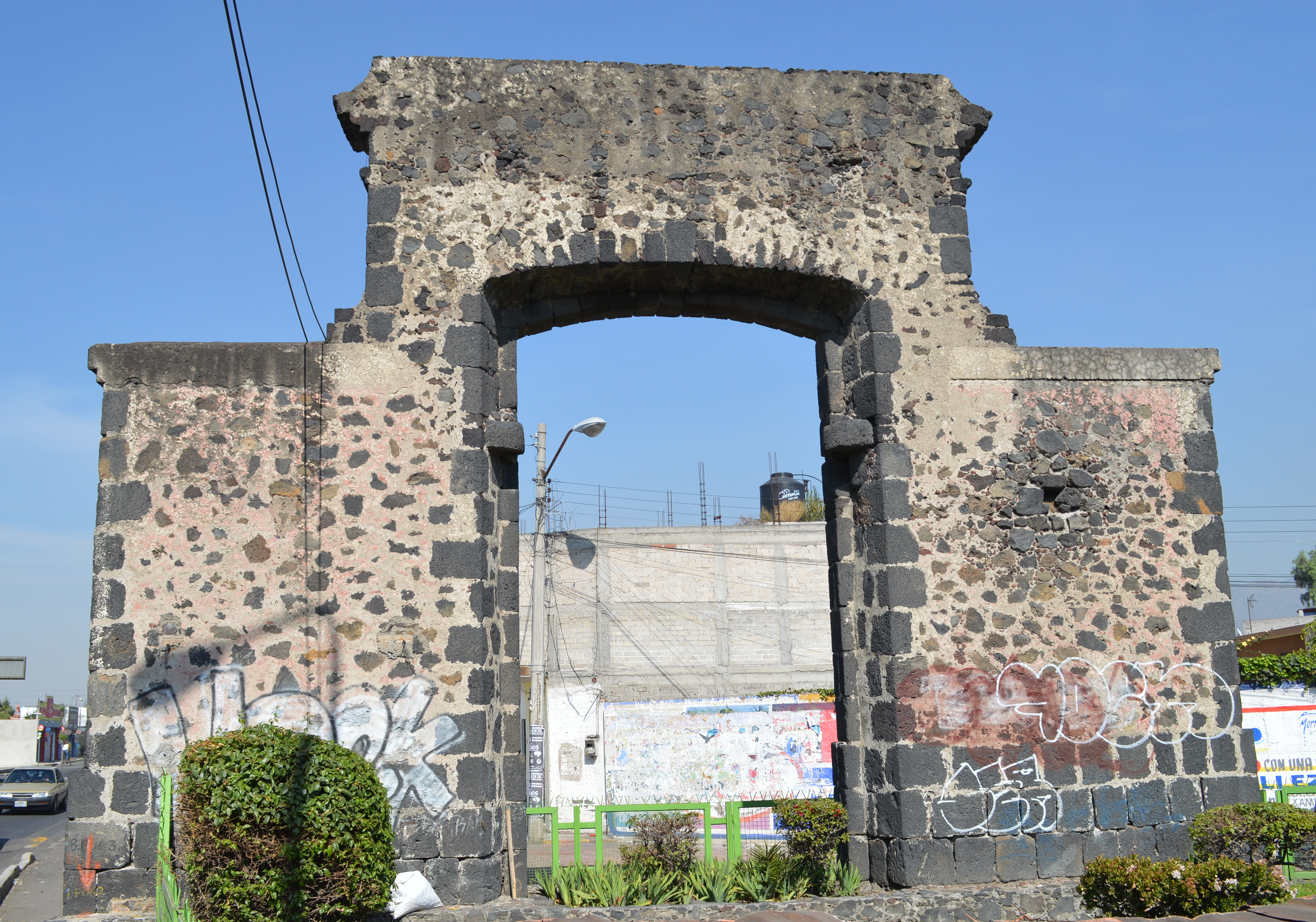
Tlaltenco's pictogram is based on the Tlaltenco's gateway
