= Enlace Hacktivista =

Wiki-based platform

- Website type: Wiki-based leak platform
- Owner: Anonymous collective
- Website: enlacehacktivista.org
- Commercial: No
- Registration: Optional
- Launched: December 2021

Enlace Hacktivista (Spanish for "Hacktivist Link") is an independent, wiki-based platform that hosts and distributes hacked and leaked datasets, publishes hacktivist communiqués, and maintains a repository of historical and educational resources for digital activists.

Founded in 2022, the site has served as a key distribution point for several prominent hack-and-leak operations in Latin America. It played a central role in the dissemination of the 2022–2023 "Guacamaya Leaks", a major operation that exposed tens of terabytes of emails and documents from military, police, and companies in the mining and oil sectors across the region.

== History ==
The domain enlacehacktivista.org was launched in December 2021 and became publicly active in early 2022. The platform was established by an anonymous collective with the goal of documenting the history of hackers and hacktivist activities. Additionally, the site aimed to share educational resources for digital activists and those interested in information security, as well as provide a secure space for hackers to publish their hacks, leaks, and communiqués. The site also functions as a platform to publish news relevant to hackers, particularly those facing legal challenges or imprisonment.

Enlace Hacktivista operates on a wiki-based platform, allowing collaborative editing and the contribution of content from various sources. The site is hosted by FlokiNET, an Icelandic hosting provider known for its commitment to privacy and freedom of speech. This platform has provided the means for hacktivists to share materials that might otherwise be suppressed, ensuring that important data is made available to the public.

The platform gained significant attention in March 2022 when it became the primary site for the Guacamaya hacktivist group to release a large-scale data leak from the Guatemalan mining company CGN-Pronico. This release marked the beginning of a series of major leaks facilitated through the platform, most notably the 2022–2023 Guacamaya Leaks. This operation exposed tens of terabytes of emails and documents from military, police, and companies in the mining and oil sectors across Latin America.

The collective behind Enlace Hacktivista has emphasized its commitment to transparency and the dissemination of information in the public interest. In addition to supporting hacktivist causes, the platform collaborates with organizations such as DDoSecrets to ensure sensitive materials are handled responsibly. This cooperation has allowed for the responsible sharing of important data with journalists, researchers, and the general public.

== Platform and operations ==
Enlace Hacktivista operates using MediaWiki software, providing a collaborative, open platform for contributing content and hosting information. The platform is designed to allow digital activists and hackers to easily upload, edit, and share documents, leaks, and communiqués in a secure, user-driven environment.

To maintain privacy and avoid hosting large datasets directly on its servers, Enlace Hacktivista uses an indirect approach for distributing large data dumps. Instead of storing the files themselves, the site publishes magnet links or S3 URLs, which are pointers to the actual files hosted on external servers. This method allows the platform to facilitate access to large data sets while minimizing the risks of direct hosting. For particularly sensitive data, Enlace Hacktivista distributes access credentials to vetted journalists and researchers, ensuring that those handling the information are trustworthy and adhere to privacy and security protocols.

The collective behind Enlace Hacktivista collaborates closely with transparency organizations, most notably DDoSecrets, which plays a key role in the dissemination and preservation of data leaks. Many of the significant releases made by Enlace Hacktivista are mirrored by DDoSecrets and vice versa, expanding the reach and impact of the leaked materials. This collaboration is instrumental in amplifying the reach of data leaks and ensuring they reach the hands of the public, journalists, and researchers.

== Notable publications ==
Date	Dataset (size)	Origin of hack	Key revelations	Ref.
Mar 2022	CGN/Pronico nickel mine (≈ 2 TB)	Guatemala	Environmental and human-rights concerns around the Fénix mine	
Aug 2022	Mining & environmental agencies (≈ 2 TB)	Colombia / Guatemala	Regulatory capture & pollution data	
Sep 2022	Joint Chiefs of Chile, SEDENA-Mexico, PNC El Salvador, Armed Forces of Peru & Colombia (≈ 10 TB)	Various militaries	Internal security assessments, weapons logs	
Jul 2022	Liberty Counsel & affiliated U.S. evangelical NGOs (74 GB)	United States	Donor lists linked to anti-abortion lobbying	
Jan 2023	Cellebrite (1.7 TB) & MSAB (103 GB) forensic software	Israel / Sweden	Source code and manuals for phone-extraction tools	

== Collaborations and impact ==
Investigative consortia such as OCCRP, Forbidden Stories, and Latin American outlets including CIPER Chile and Animal Político have used Enlace Hacktivista links to obtain primary data for cross-border projects.

Academic researchers cite the site as an example of "grey-zone" information-sharing in hack-and-leak activism.

== Reception ==
Transparency advocates view the platform as a valuable repository when used with rigorous source-handling protocols. These advocates emphasize the importance of verification and transparency in ensuring that the data shared through Enlace Hacktivista is credible and can contribute to public accountability.

Security firms have warned that the site lacks explicit legal or ethical disclaimers, which could lead to the facilitation of illicit submissions. They argue that without proper safeguards, the platform may inadvertently encourage unlawful activities.

Government officials in Chile and Mexico criticized the publication of sensitive military data, claiming it posed risks to national security. These criticisms highlight concerns over the potential misuse of leaked information and the vulnerabilities it creates for the countries involved.

== See also ==
- Guacamaya (hacktivist group)
- Distributed Denial of Secrets
- Hacktivism
