= Tláhuac metro station =

Mexico City Metro station

Tláhuac
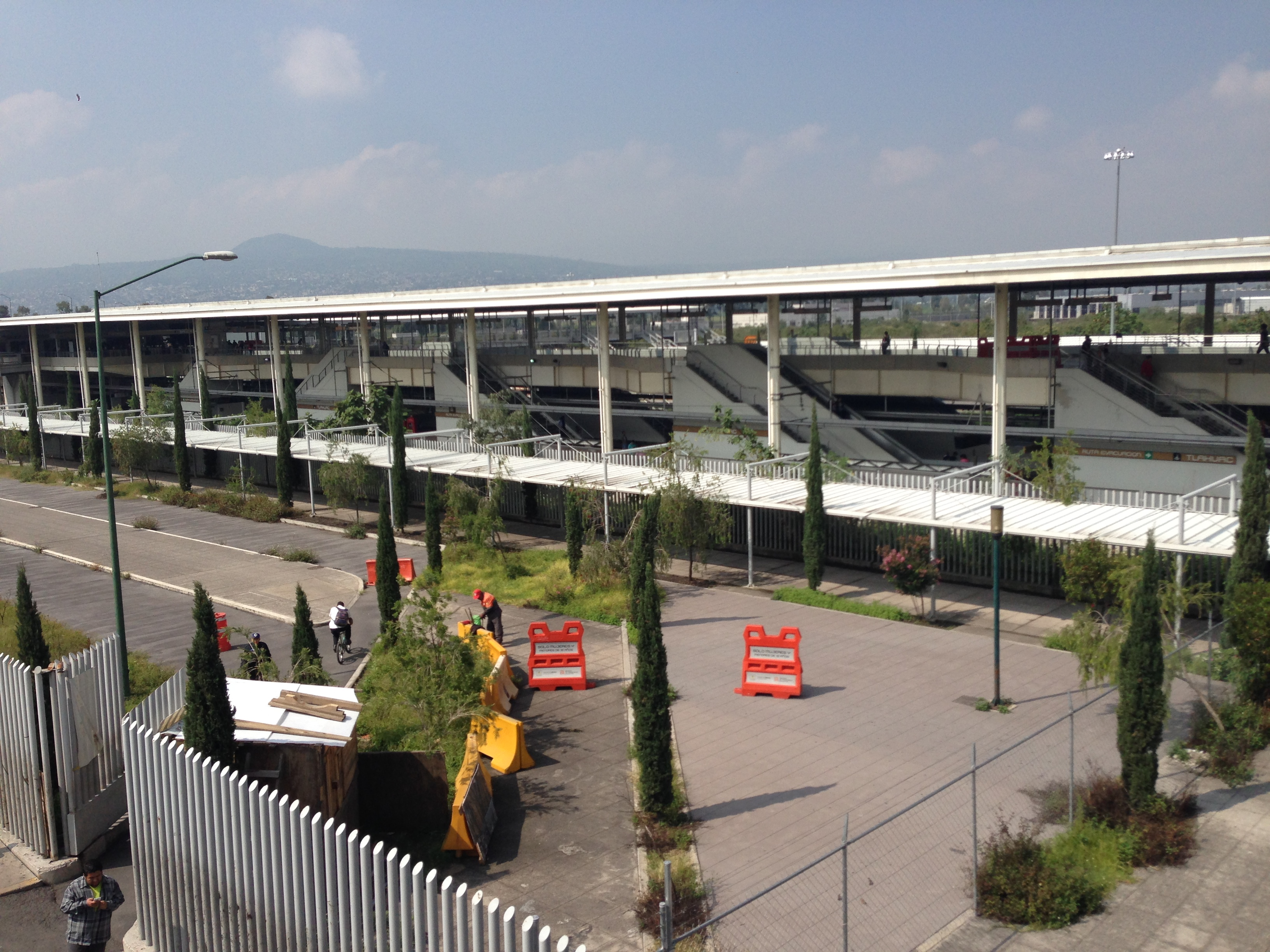
- Tláhuac station, 2017

General information
- Location: San Rafael Atlixco Avenue; Tláhuac, Mexico City; Mexico
- Coordinates: 19°17′11″N 99°00′51″W
- System: Mexico City Metro
- Owner: Government of Mexico City
- Operator: Sistema de Transporte Colectivo (STC)
- Platforms: 2 island platforms
- Tracks: 3
- Connections: Tláhuac; Routes: 141, 148, 149

Construction
- Structure type: At grade
- Cycle facilities: Bicycle parking-only
- Accessible: Yes

Other information
- Status: In service

History
- Opened: 30 October 2012

Key dates
- 12 March 2014; 12 years ago: Temporarily closed
- 29 November 2015; 10 years ago: Reopened
- 19 September 2017; 9 years ago: Temporarily closed
- 30 October 2017; 9 years ago: Reopened
- 3 May 2021; 5 years ago: Temporarily closed
- 30 January 2024; 2 years ago: Reopened

Passengers
- 2025: 19,273,158 (Note: The data here is limited to the most recent ten years to avoid excessive listings; earlier figures can be found in this page's history or on the Mexico City Metro website. To calculate the average daily ridership, the annual total is divided by 365 days (366 in leap years), with decimals omitted from the result. Each station per line is ranked individually, as the system counts transfer stations separately. The percentage change is calculated automatically using the data from the current year and the previous year.) ▲23.9%
- Rank: 6/195

Services
Preceding station	Mexico City Metro	Following station
Tlaltenco toward Mixcoac	Line 12	Terminus
Route map
Location
- Location within Mexico City urban area
- Area map

Tláhuac metro station (Note: Estación del Metro Tláhuac. Spanish pronunciation: [ˈtlawak]. The etymology comes from the Nahuatl language. There are different interpretations for "Tláhuac", including "land that emerges", "land where it is cultivated or sown", "place where the Tlatoani sings", among others.) is a station of the Mexico City Metro in the colonia of El Triángulo, Tláhuac, Mexico City. It is an at-grade station with two island platforms that serves as the southern terminus of Line 12 (the Golden Line). The station's pictogram features the glyph of Tláhuac. It is followed by Tlaltenco station, in the same borough. The station was opened on 30 October 2012, on the first day of the service Tláhuac–Mixcoac.

Since it was planned, Tláhuac metro station has had multiple conflicts and incidents, including protests from the previous owners of the land lots, a 20-month closure in 2014 due to structural faults found in the elevated section of the line, and the subsequent collapse of the track near Olivos station. The facilities are accessible to people with disabilities as there are elevators, tactile pavings and braille signage plates. Additionally, there is a bicycle parking station, an Internet café, and a bus terminal. In 2019, the station had an average daily ridership of 56,831 passengers, making it the 14th busiest station in the network and the busiest of the line.

== Location ==
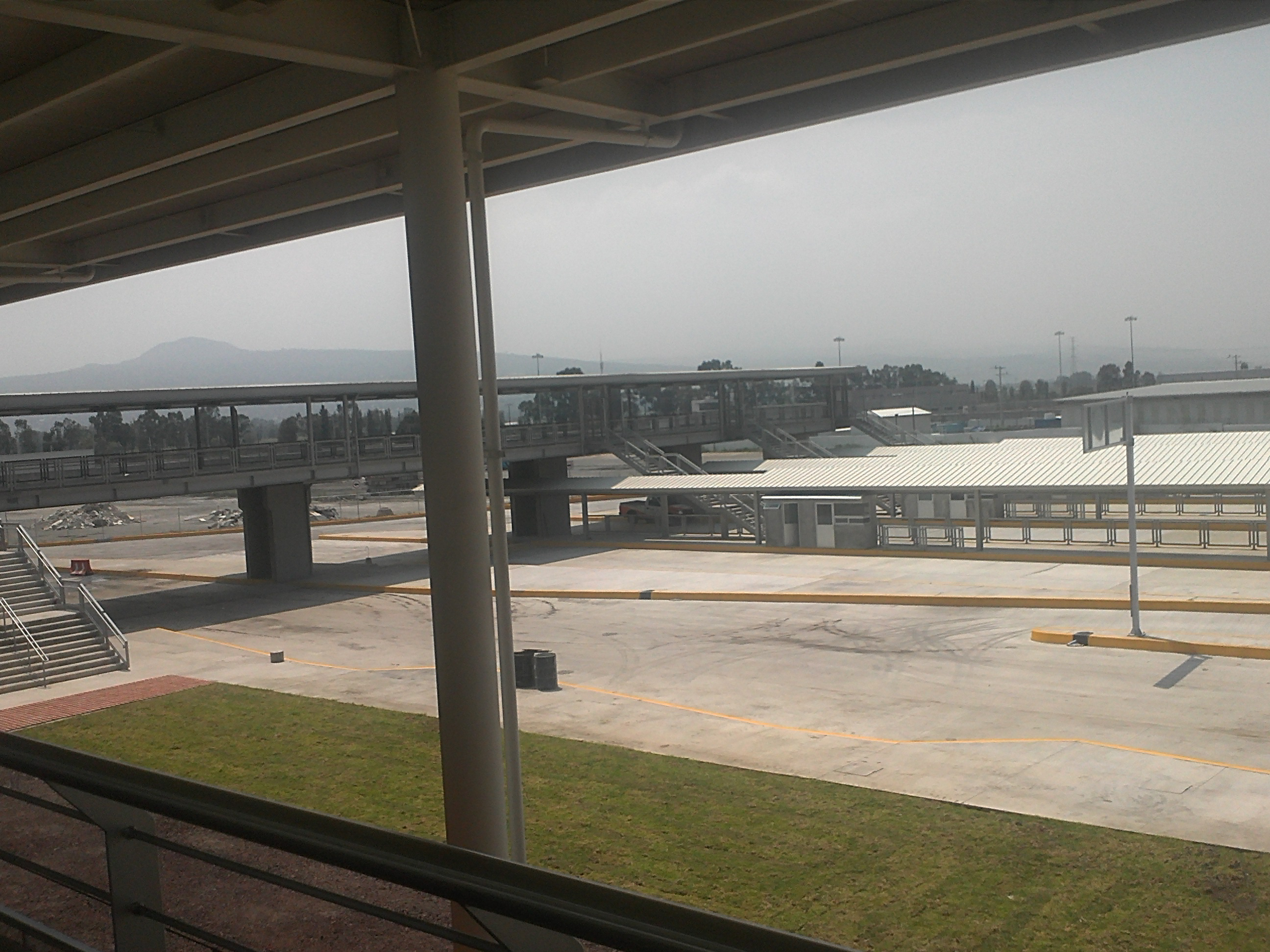
View of the bus terminal at Tláhuac station, 2012

Tláhuac is a metro station along San Rafael Atlixco Avenue, in the colonia (Mexican Spanish for "neighborhood") of El Triángulo, in the Tláhuac borough, in southeastern Mexico City. Within the system, Tlaltenco is the next station.

Tláhuac is serviced by a bus terminal, whose tender process for its construction started in September 2010 and required an investment of 280 million pesos. Although the bus terminal was built along with the station, the Centro de transferencia modal (CETRAM), a type of transport hub, was officially opened until January 2014. The delay was caused by a conflict between the representatives of 108 concessionary transport routes. The area is serviced by Routes 141, 148, and 149 of the Red de Transporte de Pasajeros network.

=== Exits ===
There are two exits:

- Northeast: San Rafael Atlixco Avenue and Antonio Bejaral Avenue, El Triángulo.
- Northwest: San Rafael Atlixco Avenue and José Bernal Street, El Triángulo.

== History and construction ==
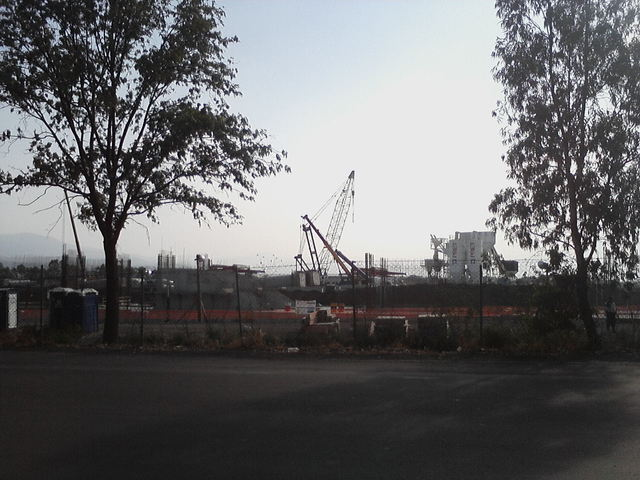
Tláhuac station under construction, April 2011

To build Tláhuac metro station and Line 12's rail yard, the Government of Mexico City expropriated a place called Terromotitla in November 2008, and 126 parcels of the ejido San Francisco Tlaltenco in April 2009. According to the then-General Director of the Metro, Francisco Bojórquez, all the parcels were legally purchased at 600 pesos per square meter. However, both expropriations were protested by ejidatarios, who considered them to have been illegally acquired.

Line 12 of the Mexico City Metro was built by Empresas ICA in association with Alstom Mexicana and Grupo Carso. The station was opened on 30 October 2012, on the first day of the Mixcoac–Tláhuac service. The pictogram of the station references the glyph of the borough. Tláhuac station was built at grade; the Tláhuac–Tlaltenco interstation is 1,298 meters (4,259 ft) long. The facilities are accessible to people with disabilities as there are elevators, tactile pavings and braille signage plates; there is also a bicycle parking station and an Internet café.

=== Incidents ===
Since 2010, the Superior Auditor of the Federation has audited Line 12 several times and has reported several faults—like cracks and detachments—along the line, including some inside the Tláhuac metro station, the Tlaltenco–Tláhuac interstation, and at Tláhuac's rail yard.

From 12 March 2014 to 29 November 2015, Tláhuac was closed due to technical and structural faults in the Atlalilco–Tláhuac stretch. After the 19 September 2017 earthquake damaged the Line 12 tracks, Tláhuac remained closed until 30 October 2017. The earthquake damaged a CETRAM's elevated walkway, which separated 5 centimeters (2.0 in) from the stairs and had subsidence of 10 centimeters (3.9 in) from the lobby. On 13 September 2020, a sixteen-year-old woman gave birth inside the station, the second of the year in the network.

On 3 May 2021, Tláhuac metro station was closed after a portion of Line 12's elevated railway collapsed near Olivos station. Since then, the city has provided public and private transportation from Tláhuac to Atlalilco, Tasqueña and Universidad metro stations. On 26 May 2021, the Mexico City Metrobús started a free, temporary route from Tláhuac to Atlalilco station. On 21 June 2021, an alternate route toward Coyuya metro station was started.

The Tláhuac station was reopened on January 30th, 2024.

=== Ridership ===
According to the data provided by the authorities, the Tláhuac metro station has been one of the busiest stations of the system's 195 stations. Except for the years when the station was closed for several months, commuters have averaged per year between 34,000 and 57,000 daily entrances. In 2019, before the impact of the COVID-19 pandemic on public transport, the station's ridership totaled 20,743,670 passengers, an increase of 2,118,568 passengers compared to 2018. In the same year, Tláhuac was the 14th busiest of the system and it was the busiest of the line.

Annual passenger ridership
Year	Ridership	Average daily	Rank	% change	Ref.
2025	19,273,158	52,803	6/195	+23.90%	
2024	15,555,130	42,500	9/195	NA	
2023	0	0	188/195	NA	
2022	0	0	176/195	−100.00%	
2021	3,245,863	8,892	101/195	−75.65%	
2020	13,331,263	36,424	10/195	−35.73%	
2019	20,743,670	56,831	14/195	+11.37%	
2018	18,625,102	51,027	15/195	+23.47%	
2017	15,084,248	41,326	20/195	+4.21%	
2016	14,475,541	39,550	22/195	+1,492.72%	

== Gallery ==
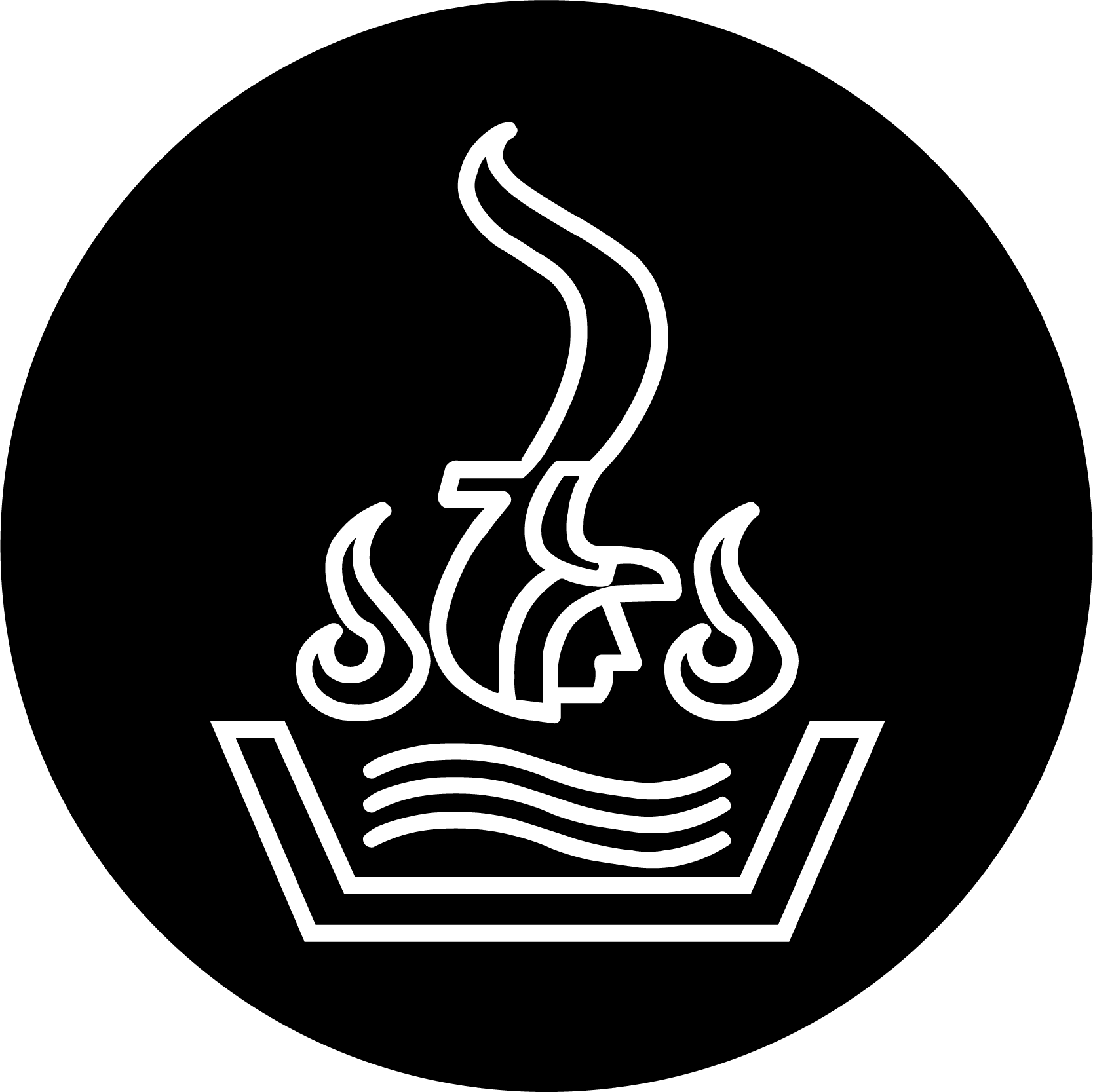
The shield of Tláhuac served as the inspiration for the station's pictogram.
