= Mexico City Metro overpass collapse =

2021 railway accident in Tláhuac, Mexico

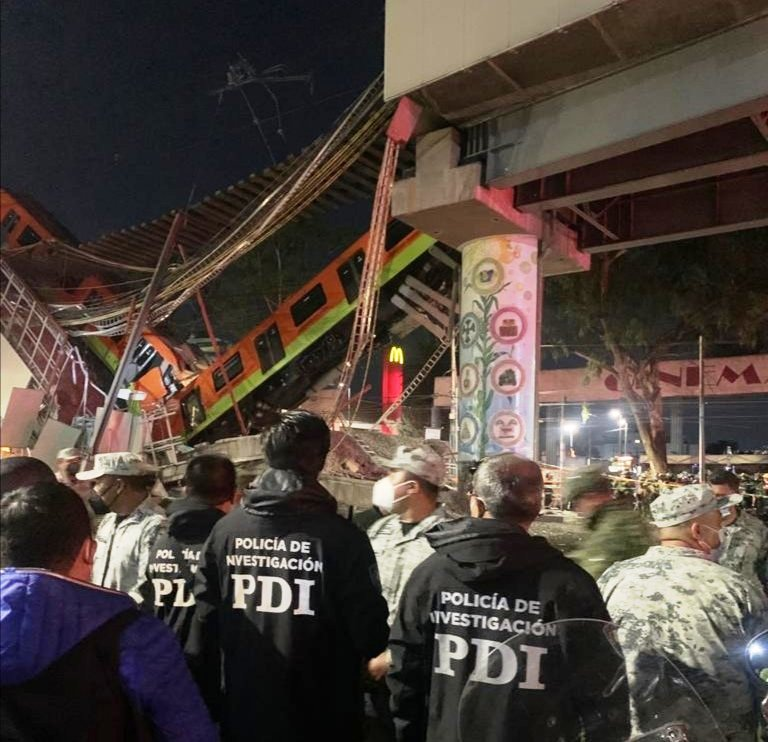
- Investigators on site the night of the collapse

Details
- Date: 3 May 2021; 5 years ago 22:22 CDT (UTC-5)
- Location: Tezonco–Olivos elevated interstation Tláhuac Avenue, Tláhuac, Mexico City
- Coordinates: 19.3049°N 99.0613°W
- Country: Mexico
- Line: Line 12
- Operator: Sistema de Transporte Colectivo (STC)
- Incident type: Railway collapse
- Cause: Structural failure caused by faulty welding and lack of functional studs that led to fatigue in the collapse point

Statistics
- Trains: 1
- Vehicles: 1
- Crew: 1
- Deaths: 26
- Injured: 98

On 3 May 2021, at 22:22 CDT (UTC−5), a girder overpass in the borough of Tláhuac carrying Line 12 of the Mexico City Metro collapsed beneath a passing train. The overpass, along with the last two railcars of the train, fell onto Avenida Tláhuac near Olivos station, resulting in 26 fatalities and 98 injuries. It was the deadliest accident in the Metro's history in nearly 50 years.

Before the line opened, it faced technical and structural issues that persisted during its operation, resulting in a partial closure of the elevated section where the accident occurred, lasting from 2014 to 2015. An earthquake in 2017 further damaged the structure; although repairs were completed within a few months, residents reported that problems persisted for years. Originally announced in 2007, Line 12 was supposed to be an underground line capable of operating rubber-tired trains. However, budget and time constraints led to modifications that allowed underground and above-ground operation with steel-wheeled trains. The construction was carried out by Empresas ICA, in partnership with Alstom Mexicana and Grupo Carso. It was the first railroad construction project assigned to Carso, the conglomerate owned by businessman Carlos Slim, which built the section that later collapsed.

Claudia Sheinbaum, the head of government of the city at the time of the collapse, hired the Norwegian risk management firm Det Norske Veritas (DNV) to investigate the causes of the event. Preliminary findings linked the accident to bridge construction deficiencies, including a lack of functional studs and faulty welds, fatiguing the collapsed beam. Researchers have identified the design change as a factor in track instability and damage since the line commenced operations. Further investigations concluded that the bridge had been designed and built without adhering to quality standards, that the line's construction and design changes had been inadequately supervised, and that there were insufficient fixing and safety elements. Additionally, it was found that periodic maintenance checks, which could have detected the girder buckling, had not been conducted—a claim contested by the city government.

Carso denied any wrongdoing; however, Slim agreed with the Mexican government to repair the section at no cost. In December 2021, the city's attorney general's office filed charges against ten former officials involved in the construction and supervision of the project, including its director. As of November 2026, the surviving defendants were awaiting trial on charges of manslaughter, injury, and property damage. The bridge was rebuilt, the sections constructed by Carso were reinforced, and the line underwent general maintenance, fully reopening on 30 January 2024.

== Background ==
=== Metro system ===
The Sistema de Transporte Colectivo (STC) operates the Mexico City Metro, one of the world's busiest urban transportation systems, which served approximately 4.5 million passengers daily in 2019. It was the second-largest metro system in North America in 2021.

Deterioration within the rail system resulted in multiple accidents and incidents, including a collision between two trains at Tacubaya metro station in March 2020, a railway coupler breaking while a train was operating near Misterios metro station the following month, a fire in the Metro's downtown headquarters in January 2021 that resulted in the death of a police officer, hospitalized 30 people, temporarily shut down six metro lines for several days, or a reported fire on metro tracks in April 2021.

In December 2018, the recently appointed head of government of Mexico City, Claudia Sheinbaum, designated Florencia Serranía as the general director of the STC. Serranía had previously held the same position from 2004 to 2006, under the administration of Andrés Manuel López Obrador, who was the president of Mexico at the time of the collapse. From 2020 to April 2021, the position of STC deputy director-general of maintenance was vacant, and Serranía assumed management of that role.

=== Line 12 and rolling stock ===
Line 12 route map

Line 12 operates from south-central Mexico City to the semi-rural southeastern borough of Tláhuac, serving approximately 350,000 passengers daily in 2019. In May 2021, it was the newest line in the Metro system.

The head of government of Mexico City, Marcelo Ebrard, announced the line in August 2007, and construction commenced in September 2008. Originally, the line was planned to be primarily underground, featuring 23 stations, 20 of which were to be underground (from Mixcoac to Nopalera), the section where the collapse occurred. The original budget for the project was MX$13 billion.

The opening was initially expected to coincide with the 200th anniversary of Mexico's independence in 2010. Multiple construction delays postponed its inauguration by Ebrard and required intervention from the federal government, led by the president Felipe Calderón. The project was modified to have fewer underground stations and nine elevated stations (from Culhuacán to Zapotitlán). Additionally, the elevated section would run along a different avenue to that originally planned, Avenida Tláhuac.

The line was constructed by Empresas ICA in association with Alstom Mexicana and Grupo Carso, the latter owned by business magnate Carlos Slim. It was Carso's first project in railway construction, and they built the bridge between Calle 11 and Zapotitlán stations. Ebrard and Calderón inaugurated the line in October 2012 a few days before the end of their terms. The project's cost soared to MX$26 billion (US$1.29 billion as of 2021).

The line runs FE-10 trains, a steel-wheeled model manufactured by Construcciones y Auxiliar de Ferrocarriles (CAF). Francisco Bojórquez, the then-general director of the Metro system, advocated for rubber tires, considering them a safer option. However, an internal labor commission disagreed, supporting the more cost-effective steel wheels. Bojórquez explained that CAF trains have European specifications, but were promised to be ready one year before the proposed Bombardier trains, which followed American specifications.

Line 12 was designed similarly to Line A, the other line in the system that uses steel-wheeled trains, with considerations based on the specifications of its Bombardier trains, which are 2.50 meters (8 ft 2 in) wide and weigh 170 metric tons (170 long tons; 190 short tons) per railcar. In contrast, the FE-10 trains are wider and heavier, measuring 2.80 meters (9 ft 2 in) in width and weighing 240 metric tons (240 long tons; 260 short tons) per railcar. The change was performed without considering the track requirements or reviewing the structural calculation of an elevated overpass.

=== Line 12 issues ===
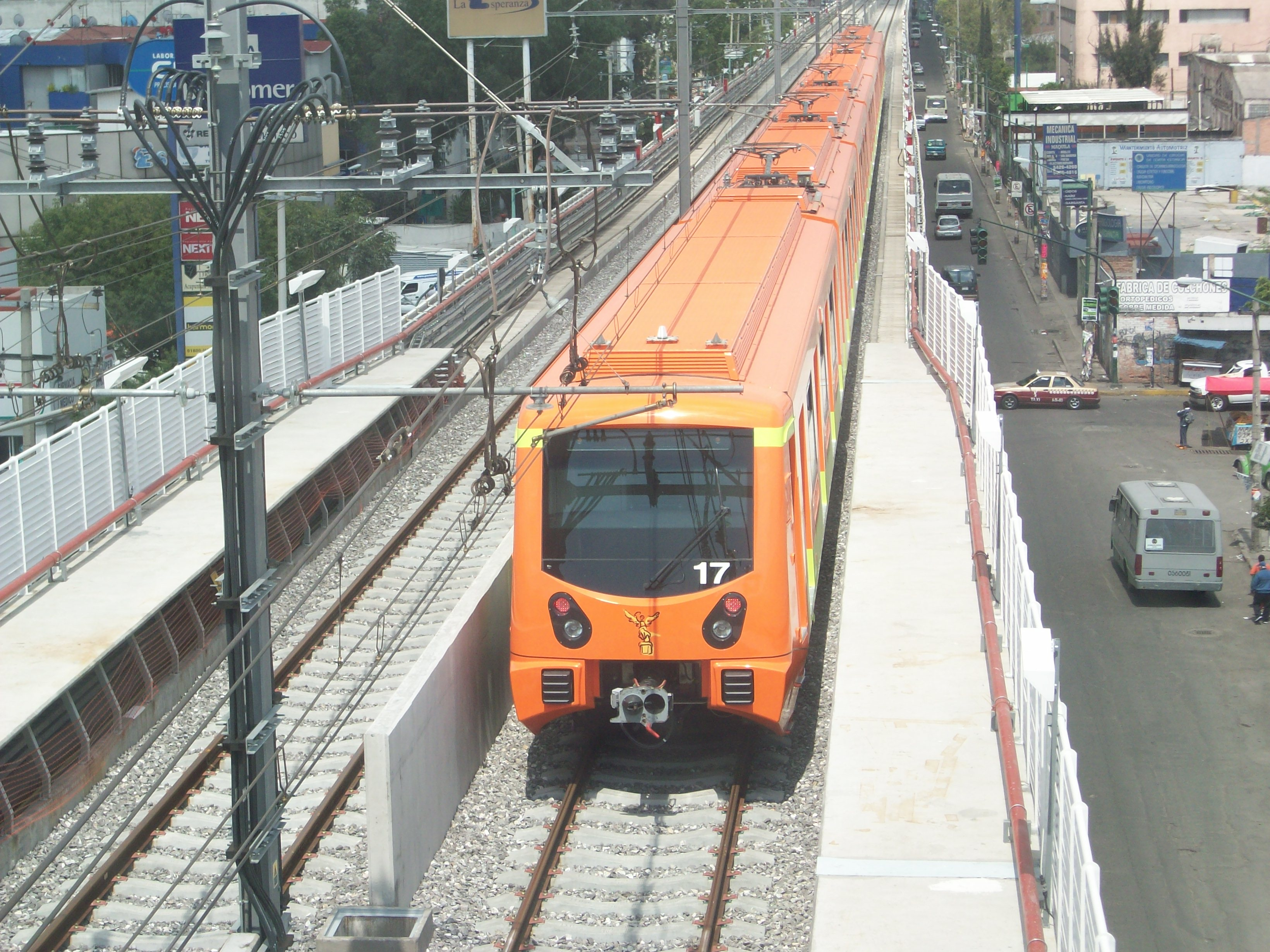
An outbound FE-10 at Calle 11 station. Several investigations have found that the train wheels caused damage to the tracks.

Line 12 encountered issues with trains on elevated sections during its construction. Before pre-operational testing began, topographic monitoring detected subsidence on several columns. Personnel recorded vibrations on the tracks in the Tláhuac area. Passenger testing commenced in June 2012; the Metro system noticed damage to approximately 10,000 ties due to vibrations in the following months. Operations necessitated speeds as low as 5 km/h (3.1 mph) on some segments to prevent damage to the tracks. A congressional report indicated that coupling unprotected rails with substandard wheels could lead to train derailments, and that Line 12 was officially certified less than an hour prior to its inauguration, despite thousands of unfinished tasks.

In March 2014, the city government closed the elevated section for 20 months for repairs due to technical and structural faults, and established a special board to investigate the errors that led to it. Thirty-three officials and former officials, including Enrique Horcasitas, the director of the Line 12 project, faced sanctions that included disqualifications from public work, fines, or both.

The administration of Miguel Ángel Mancera, Ebrard's successor, hired SYSTRA in 2014 to conduct an independent investigation and provide a report. After reviewing over 2,900 documents and testing the tracks, the team concluded that errors occurred during the "planning, design, construction, and operation" of the line. In a non-public report published by SinEmbargo.mx after the collapse, SYSTRA had noted that the wear and tear was unusual for a project that was only two years old, which they attributed to "mediocre quality" work. The group concluded that the Metro system would need to address the root causes of the wear to avoid future problems, as repairs would only serve as temporary fixes. They notified government authorities that a permanent resolution to the issues was infeasible and recommended developing a maintenance manual customized to the line's requirements for continuous operation.

In 2015, the Superior Auditor of the Federation (Auditoría Superior de la Federación; ASF) identified twelve irregularities in the construction process, including the incompatibility between the train wheels and the rails, which could lead to track instability, while noting that train operations were within accepted safety limits. According to Serranía, the French company Tricaud Société Organisée (TSO) was contracted in 2016 to maintain the daily operating conditions of the line's fixed installations and reported no concerns before the collapse.

The 2017 Puebla earthquake damaged the line's tracks, leading to the temporary closure of six stations, from Tezonco metro station to the eastern terminal. The Associated Press reported that experts advised closing the line for a comprehensive inspection instead of merely reinforcing it. The ASF noted damage to the section that eventually collapsed. Following the earthquake, residents reported visible structural cracks in the structure, prompting transport authorities to address these complaints. In January 2018, they also repaired a column between Olivos and Nopalera stations that had cracks in its base.

In 2019, residents provided photographs and videos to the authorities, expressing concerns that the bridge was buckling and that the structure was moving abnormally as trains passed. By the end of that year, the engineering firm Ingeniería, Servicios y Sistemas Aplicados (ISSA) conducted a study on the structural and geotechnical behavior of the overpass, concluding that there was no risk to the line's operation.

== Collapse ==
The Olivos–Tezonco overpass in 2012, viewed from Olivos station. The collapse site is circled in red.

On 3 May 2021 at 22:22 CDT (UTC−5), an eastbound train was traveling on the track between Olivos and Tezonco stations in Tláhuac. Approximately 220 meters (720 ft) before reaching Olivos station, the section of track between columns 12 and 13 collapsed due to a failure of the girder, causing the rear two train cars to derail. The fallen railcars formed a V shape, with one car coming to rest on the ground and the other left suspended. Debris from the collapse struck a vehicle traveling along Avenida Tláhuac, resulting in the death of the driver and injuries to his wife. The overpass was approximately 5 meters (16 ft) above ground level, situated over a concrete median strip, which minimized casualties among motorists and pedestrians below.

Twenty-six people died in the collapse, including fifteen reported deceased by midnight on 4 May, while 98 others were hospitalized. It marked the deadliest event for the Metro since 1975, when a collision between two trains resulted in the deaths of thirty-one passengers at Viaducto metro station. It was the third fatal accident within 14 months. Following the collapse, 22 individuals were reported missing; by 6 May, the number was reduced to five. According to the city government, it is likely that none of these individuals were on board the train, as they had been missing for several days prior to the accident.

Rodrigo García, the driver of the train, felt a jolt just before arriving at Olivos station, after which his control panel indicated a power failure. García activated the emergency brake, exited the cab, and observed smoke and passengers evacuating from the last car. The control center instructed him to assess the situation and reassure the passengers accordingly. He was later informed of the collapse. In the fifth and last available car, García encountered injured and unconscious people, estimating that the train was three-quarters full.

The STC warned residents to avoid the area. Witnesses began rescue efforts, later joined by first-response teams. Neighbors provided rescuers with coffee, water, and bread. A nearby shopping mall cleared its parking lot to allow authorities to establish a control post. Rescue operations were suspended after a few hours due to the structure's instability. A crane was deployed to lift sections of the train while search-and-rescue teams looked for survivors. The first train car was removed the following day at 09:20 CDT, and the second car was removed before 14:00 on the same day. All debris was cleared by the end of the month.

== Immediate aftermath ==
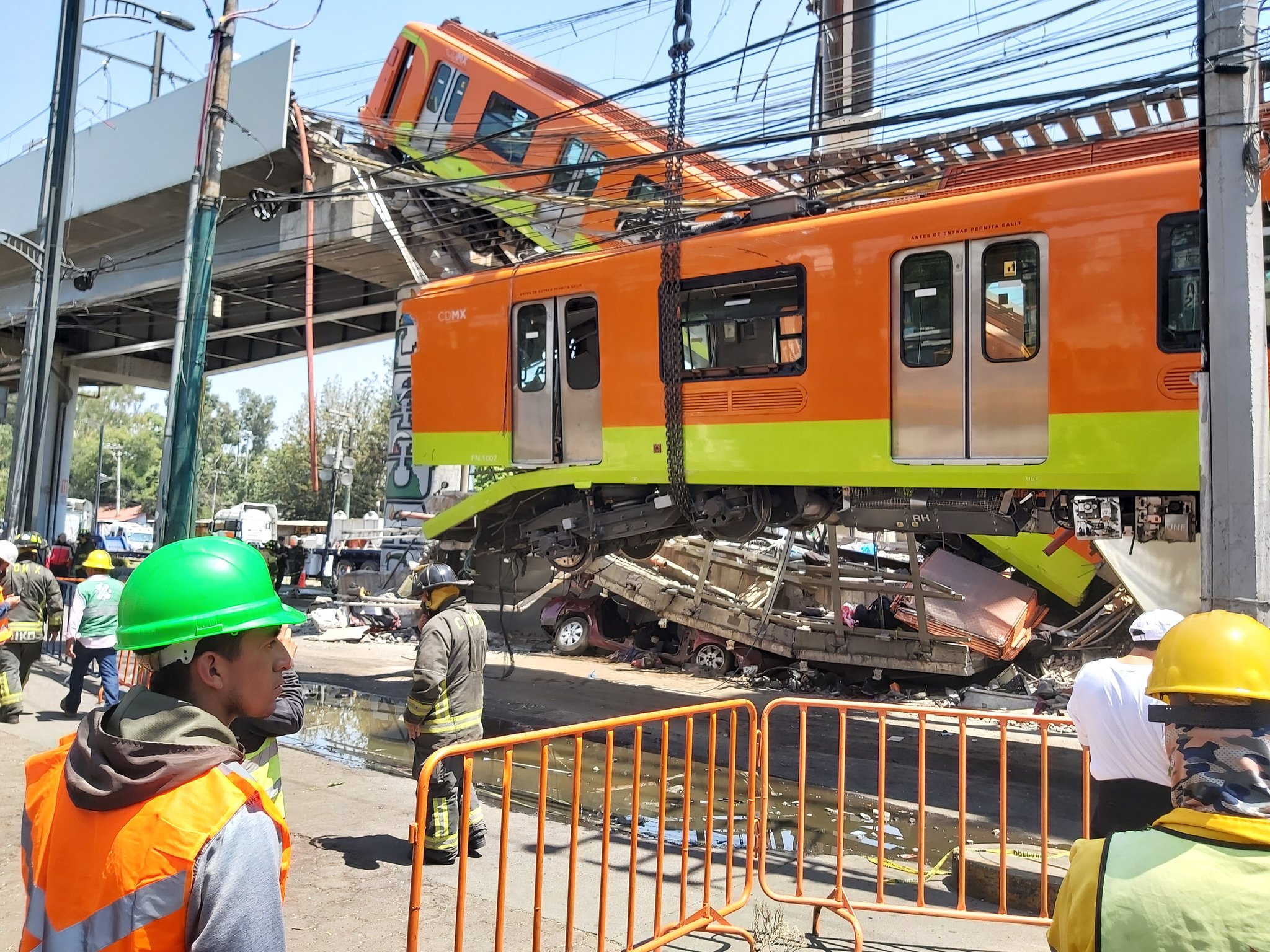
A railcar being lifted the day after the accident

Service on Line 12 was suspended. The following day, a rail replacement bus service was established, utilizing 490 city buses, which were inadequate to meet passenger demand. To enhance the service, the city contracted additional buses from Autobuses de Oriente, and added temporary bus routes to Tasqueña, Universidad, Atlalilco, and Coyuya metro stations. The federal government declared three days of national mourning. Social media users reported structural damage at other elevated stations, including Oceanía, Consulado, and Pantitlán; Sheinbaum stated that these stations would be inspected. The general secretary of the Mexican Union of Metro Workers announced that approximately 8,000 workers would go on strike due to unsafe working conditions.

Sheinbaum said that the families of those who lost their lives would receive MX$700,000 (US$35,000) each, which included MX$50,000 (US$2,500) from the city and MX$650,000 (US$32,650) from the Metro. This compensation was later increased to MX$1,870,000 per family.

When Serranía was asked about satellite images showing that the collapsed section was slightly warped, she said, "There is no such information; it is not true". The National Regeneration Movement (MORENA), the ruling party in Mexico, voted against the establishment of a special commission to investigate the collapse, referring to the proposal as "vulturesque" and asserting that the collapse had no "urgent and obvious resolution".

== Reactions ==
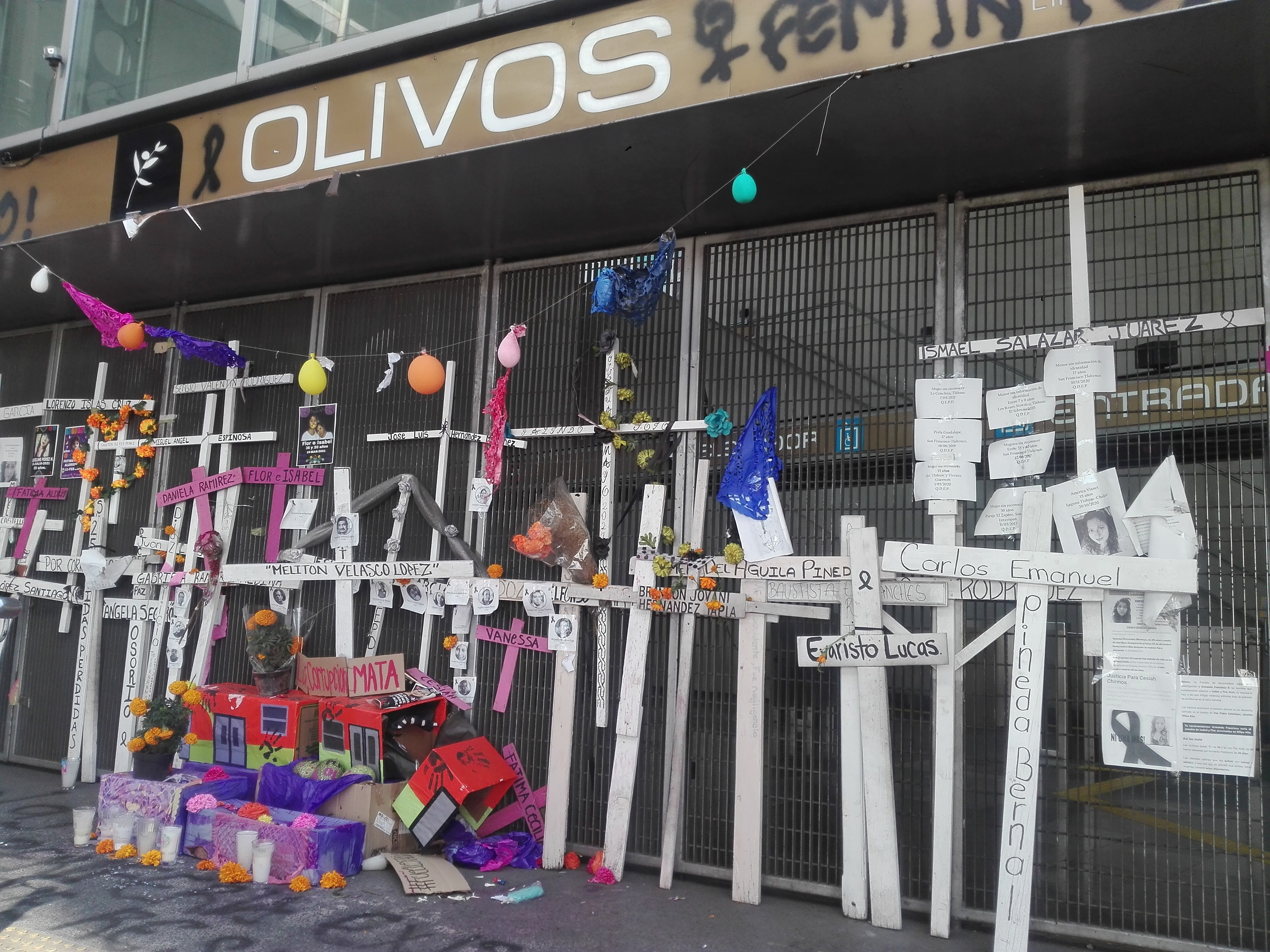
Altars set for the 2021 Day of the Dead in honor of the victims at Olivos station

Minutes after the collapse, Sheinbaum arrived at the accident site. Ebrard, who was the Secretary of Foreign Affairs, said on Twitter, "What happened today in the Metro is a terrible tragedy ... My sympathy to the victims and their families". The following morning, López Obrador extended his condolences and said, "Nothing will be hidden; we should not fall into speculation ... no accusations will be made without evidence". Carso announced that they would await official expert analyses before making any statements regarding the incident.

=== Protests and tributes ===
In the days following the collapse, protesters expressed anger over the incident and the authorities' responses by vandalizing several Metro stations, breaking glass partitions and painting slogans such as "It wasn't an accident—It was negligence" on the walls. Demonstrators marched from Periférico Oriente metro station to the accident site, carrying banners that read, "It was not an accident; those responsible have first and last names", and "Corruption kills, and the deaths are brought upon the people". Local residents set up an altar in a shopping mall near the site of the collapse. On 7 May, hundreds of protesters held a vigil at the scene, demanding justice.

For Day of the Dead in 2021, local residents encouraged others to create a thematic altar called "Train to Mictlān". On the eve of the first anniversary of the collapse, the National Action Party (PAN) installed a temporary sculpture on Paseo de la Reforma in front of the Antimonumento +43 memorial. It referenced the overpass collapse and featured the inscriptions "#FueMorena" (#ItWasMorena) and "La tragedia de la Línea 12" (The Tragedy of Line 12) on a wine-colored plinth, reflecting MORENA's colors. On the anniversary of the collapse, family members, survivors, and residents visited the site to place altars and candles. They planned to establish a memorial at the site of the collapse.

== Investigations ==
The office of the federal Attorney General (FGR), along with its Mexico City counterpart (FGJCDMX) led by Ernestina Godoy Ramos, and the Norwegian risk management firm Det Norske Veritas (DNV) were appointed to investigate the collapse.

=== DNV report ===
Some photographs from the first DNV report illustrate the root causes of the collapse

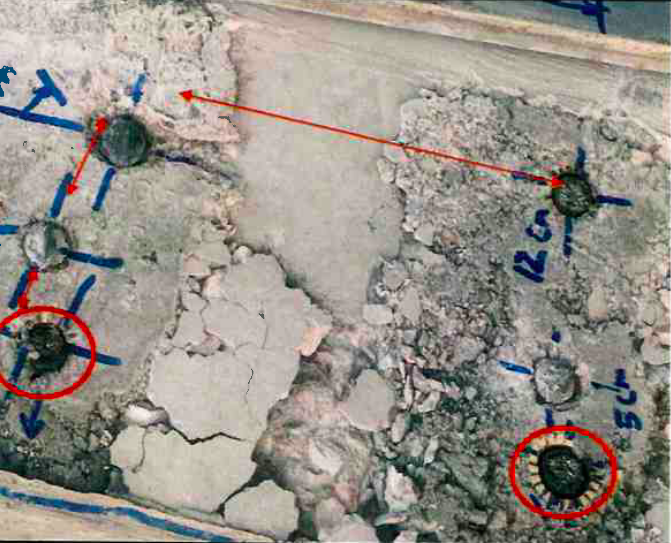
Red circles mark studs with remaining ceramic protection, highlighting surface deficiencies at the joint, while red arrows indicate uneven spacing.

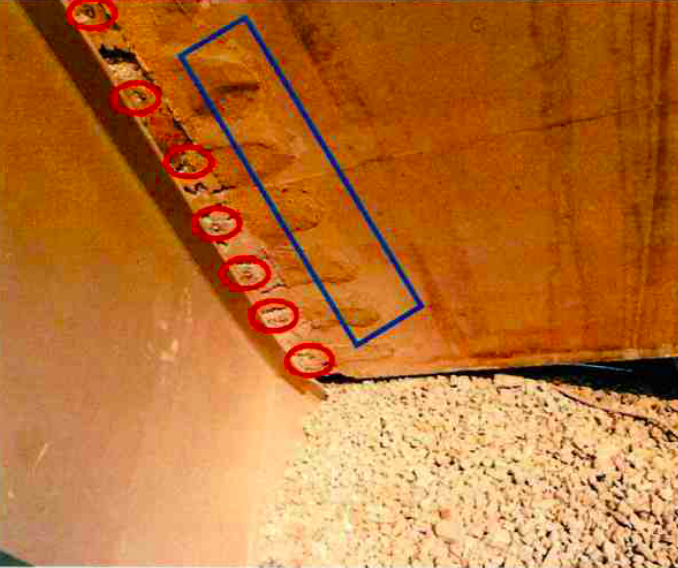
The position of the studs (highlighted in red circles) and the differences in concrete compared to the prefabricated girder (outlined in blue).

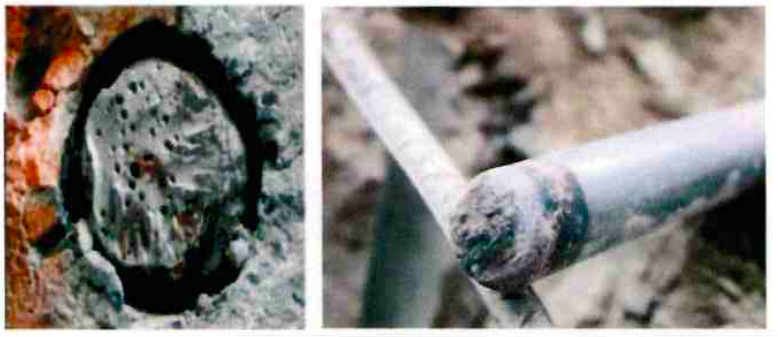
Poor welds that caused insufficient fusion to the girder.

On 5 May 2021, the city government contracted DNV to conduct an investigation into the collapse. The investigation was divided into three parts: the first part, costing MX$8,169,343, addressed the preliminary causes of the accident; the second part, which included the immediate cause, was set at MX$5,049,743; and the final part, costing MX$9,394,914, focused on the root cause and provided recommendations for the line's reopening. According to the contract, DNV was authorized to "collect information for documentary analyses, covering design, construction, rehabilitation, intervention, operation, maintenance, and supervision" of the line up to the date of the collapse.

DNV published the first part of the report on 16 June 2021, which identified structural faults associated with six construction deficiencies:

- Poor welding process of Nelson studs
- Porosity and lack of fusion in the stud–beam joint
- Insufficient Nelson studs in the beams spanning the bridge assembly
- Use of different types of concrete in the girder
- Unfinished or improperly executed welds
- Inadequate supervision and dimensional control in fillet welds

DNV investigated the adequacy of the design and materials, assessed whether the structure's performance met the design requirements, and evaluated how operations, repairs, and renovations had affected the bridge. The group reported that fewer bolts than necessary to support the structure had been installed and that the concrete covering them might have been faulty. It found an alert issued by supervisors in August 2010 regarding the construction of the Tezonco–Olivos overpass, which said that only ten reinforcement bars were to be used in the bridge, despite the original project plans specifying 20. According to El Financiero, the final report omitted four additional lines of inquiry that were previously included in a draft report: "lateral-torsional buckling of the steel beams", "crushing of the concrete slab", "influence of loads from the railroad system", and "lack of infrastructure maintenance".

DNV was initially expected to deliver the second part of the report on 14 July 2021; however, the group postponed it until 7 September of that year. In the 180-page investigation, DNV concluded that the collapse was caused by a lack of functional Nelson studs in the affected section, which resulted in the buckling of the north and south beams. Insufficient functioning studs caused the girders to function independently in conditions for which they were not designed, leading to distortion in the central transverse frame and fatigue in the support. Additionally, poor distribution of the existing bolts and inadequate welds in the area contributed to the collapse.

The third part of the report was initially expected in August 2021 but was delivered on 28 February of the following year. The city government rejected the report's conclusions and withheld its publication. On 4 May 2022, when she was asked about its existence, Sheinbaum described the report as a "deficient, poorly produced, [...] tendentious and false" document that presented "technical issues". She said that it served the interests of opposition parties, that DNV had unilaterally altered the methodology originally presented when the firm was hired, and that the company had a conflict of interest because one of DNV's lawyers had previously litigated against López Obrador. She announced a civil lawsuit against DNV and indicated that the firm would not receive payment for the final part of the report. Andrés Lajous, the city's Secretary of Mobility, explained that what the government referred to as a change in the report's methodology pertained to DNV's decision to "plant maintenance" as a cause of the collapse. DNV maintained that its report was delivered "in accordance with the agreed [root cause analysis] methodology and to strict internal quality and revision procedures". The firm added that Héctor Salomón Galindo Alvarado, the referred lawyer, was hired in July 2019 and had no authority over the reports or investigations conducted by the company or being contracted by DNV México.

On 9 May 2022, the Spanish newspaper El País published part of the third report, in which DNV concluded that the root cause of the accident was the bridge's design not complying with construction standards. Key factors included the lack of certification by an independent entity, inadequate supervision, changes to the original design, misplaced, poorly welded, or missing studs throughout the girders, and a lack of maintenance inspections from 2012 to 2019, despite recommendations for annual inspections in the ICA–Carso–Alstom manual. During the 2019 inspection, the hired company commented that they were not given sufficient time to conduct a thorough review. The city government gave a conference two days later and explained the discrepancies they identified, including:

- DNV did not compare the collapsed section with similar segments
- DNV relied on Google tools, including Google Street View, despite a disclaimer indicating that the data may not reflect actual conditions
- DNV initially claimed that the deformations were not visible to the naked eye but later contradicted this using Google Street View images
- The ICA–Carso–Alstom maintenance manual did not specify methodologies for assessing deformation criteria
- The report initially stated that no maintenance reports were provided but later acknowledged that reports for 2019 and 2020 did exist
- DNV did not follow the requested methodology.

Sheinbaum announced that the contract with DNV would be terminated and that a group of engineers would be hired to "present the complete truth".

=== Other investigations ===
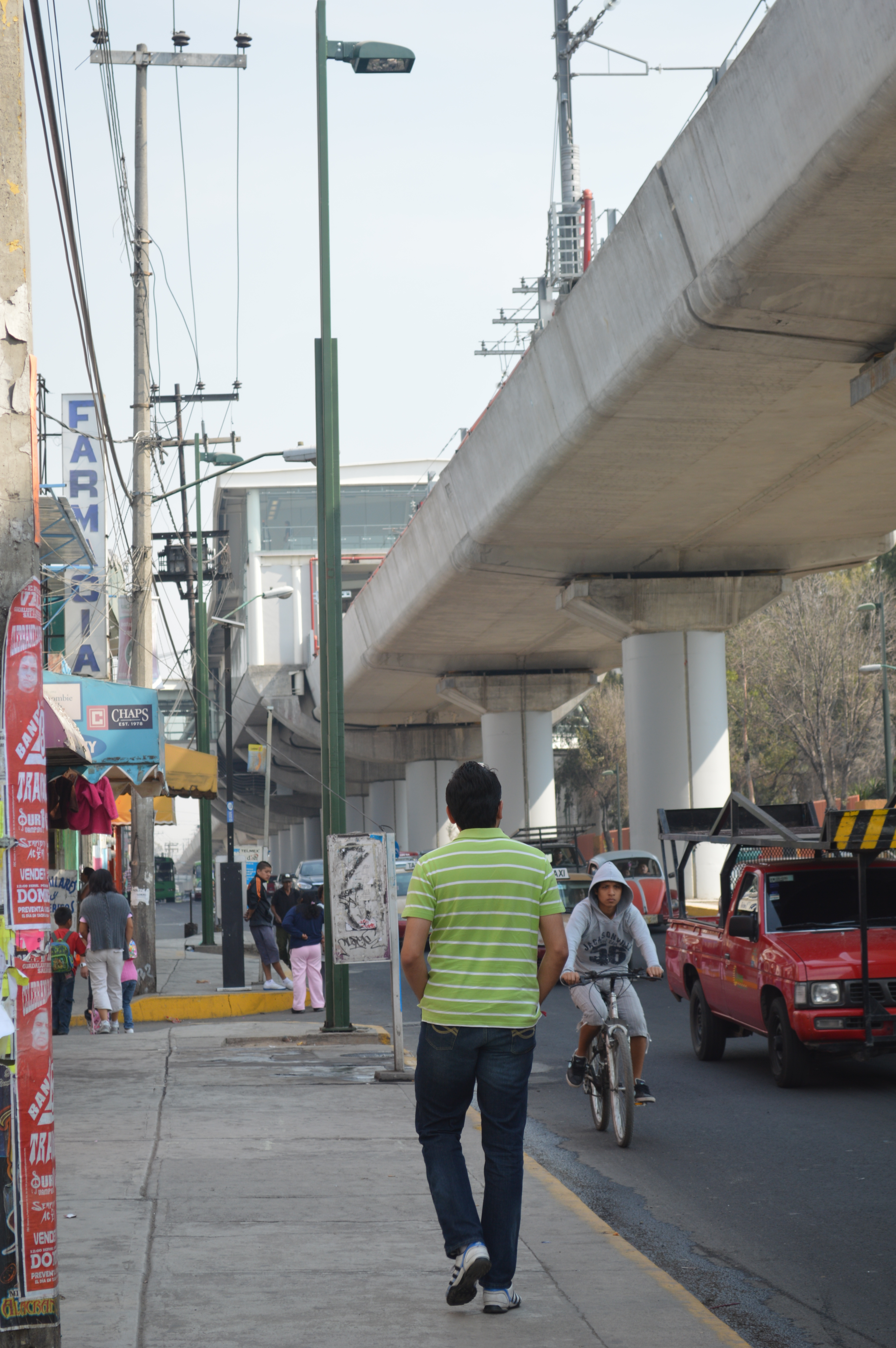
Concrete girders used by ICA (shown near Zapotitlán station). The CICM found that, unlike the steel girders used in the collapsed section, these concrete girders showed only "minor and common deficiencies" along the overpass.

Three days before DNV released its report, journalists from The New York Times (NYT) published an investigation attributing the collapse to a series of errors originating in its planning. The report indicated that the line was built hastily as Ebrard's administration was nearing its end, and steel studs connecting the steel to the concrete slab failed due to poor-quality welds and failure to remove ceramic rings. It also noted that the city approved substandard work and that audits after the 2017 earthquake revealed errors in the original construction, including missing steel components and improperly poured concrete. Sheinbaum criticized the NYT article, asserting that the newspaper has sought to confront the Fourth Transformation—the president's political platform. Ebrard said that the collapse resulted from a lack of maintenance rather than structural faults.

The FGJCDMX investigation found results similar to DNV's initial report. It revealed that shear bolts connecting the concrete slabs to the beams were misaligned, and in some cases, the studs were not fused with the beams, causing distortion-related fatigue. The report concluded that the collapse occurred when the eastbound beam suddenly failed, dragging the westbound beam down within 1.9 seconds. Additionally, a study by specialists for the FGR indicated that the collapsed section had only 65 percent of the necessary bolts. They noted a lack of inspection reports addressing bridge issues, stating that existing deformities and defects could have been identified with proper maintenance and specialized examinations.

The College of Civil Engineers of Mexico (Colegio de Ingenieros Civiles de México; CICM) conducted independent studies of Line 12, excluding the collapsed area. They found that the bridge features two types of girders: concrete girders built by ICA from Culhuacán to Calle 11 stations, and steel girders built by Carso from Calle 11 to Zapotitlán stations. The study found that 68 percent of the elevated section exhibited minor and common deficiencies, while the remaining 32 percent—between Periférico Oriente and Zapotitlán stations—showed vulnerabilities requiring further analyses. These vulnerabilities included poor welds, improper spacing between beams, cracks in columns and beams, and irregularities in the steel structure support. The institution recommended a reinforcement and rehabilitation project before any reopening, and cautioned against reopening the underground section, as the railway workshops necessary for train maintenance are situated after Tláhuac metro station, the line's terminus.

== Reconstruction and reopening ==
In June 2021, Sheinbaum discussed with ICA and Carso their potential financial responsibility for the reconstruction of the elevated section. On 22 June, López Obrador met with Sheinbaum and Slim, where they reached an agreement that Slim would assist with the reconstruction. López Obrador emphasized the urgency, stating that the work should be completed "as soon as possible" and aimed for Line 12 to be operational "within a year at the latest, with full safety". After a week, López Obrador announced that Carso had agreed to rebuild the collapsed section at no cost, with Slim remarking that there were no errors in the construction.

In December 2021, Sheinbaum stated that the reconstruction of the collapsed section was anticipated to be finished by the end of 2022. In multiple technical meetings, various officials—including Serranía—discussed the possibility of replacing the trains due to the damage they were causing to the tracks, warning that without replacement, repairs would only be temporary. Sheinbaum stated there was no budget and that she needed to keep the line operational before leaving office.

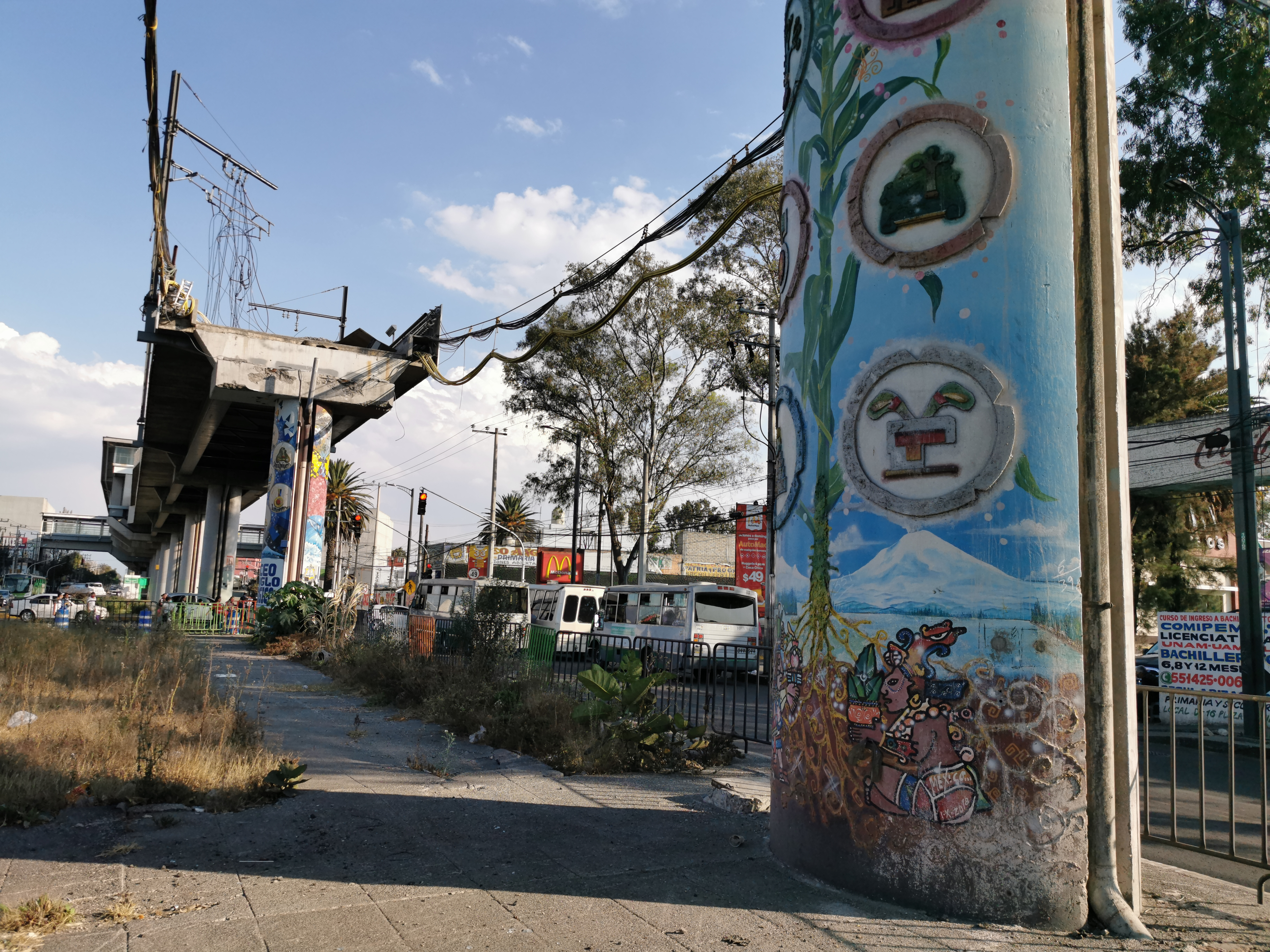
The collapse site in January 2022, before reconstruction work began.

Reconstruction of the collapsed section began on 16 February 2022. A total of 6.7 km (4.2 mi) underwent strengthening with column reinforcements and supports, including struts, diaphragms, and tensors. A girder located 200 meters (660 ft) from the accident site was dismantled and rebuilt. According to the Guacamaya Leaks, which involved multiple internet leaks of classified documents from the Secretariat of National Defense by the hacktivist group Guacamaya, Mexico City authorities requested the army to donate 20,000 t (20,000 long tons; 22,000 short tons) of steel for the girders' reinforcement, which was originally intended for the canceled Texcoco Airport. Sheinbaum confirmed this information, stating that the unused material from the construction of Felipe Ángeles International Airport was repurposed for the reinforcement of Line 12.

The underground section of Line 12, which runs from Mixcoac to Atlalilco stations, reopened on 15 January 2023. In preparation for the section reopening, 15,000 ties and rails were replaced in interstation tunnels, leaks were repaired, and the track ballast was upgraded to a firmer material. The section operated thirteen trains and was patrolled by members of the National Guard, who were deployed to all metro stations following the 2023 Mexico City Metro train crash, amid Sheinbaum's allegations that the system was under attack from saboteurs. The next section, from Culhuacán to Periférico Oriente stations, opened on 15 July 2023. The last section, including the area where the collapse occurred, reopened on 30 January 2024.

== Aftermath and litigation ==
After the first DNV report, Grupo Carso lost MX$7.8 billion on the Mexican Stock Exchange. They lost an additional MX$2.7 billion after announcing plans to rebuild the collapsed section. Just days before the second report's delivery, DNV filed a complaint with the FGJCDMX due to a breach in the chain of custody regarding a package sent to the United States for further studies. Upon its return to Mexico, the box containing the samples had been tampered with, which could impact the investigation.

In August 2021, the FGJCDMX initiated an investigation into 11 welders and two supervisors. By October, charges of manslaughter, injury, and property damage were announced against Horcasitas, along with nine former officials and supervisors. Many of these individuals had been disqualified from public office in 2014 and 2015 for their roles in the project's planning and construction. Horcasitas' defense argued that errors arose when the city sought to modify the original project and contracted different companies, claiming that the line's infrastructure had not received proper maintenance since its opening. The defense also pointed out that the Spanish version of DNV's report omitted maintenance-related information. Ten former officials were charged in December 2021, and as of May 2026, eight of them were awaiting trial, with no date had been set for a preliminary hearing. In the meantime, two of the defendants had died.

Carso estimated that the reconstruction and reinforcement of the collapsed bridge would cost MX$800 million. In November 2021, the company stated that it had subcontracted the stud-welding company J. J. Jiménez, S. A. de C. V. in 2010, and that Carso had supervised the work through a verification system that assessed the welding of the studs, their alignment, and their final positions.

By February 2022, 80 percent of those affected had received compensation from Carso as part of a deal stipulating that they would not pursue legal action or seek additional payments. This percentage increased to 90 percent by May 2022. Compensation amounts varied based on the severity of injuries, ranging from 450,000 to six million pesos (about US$21,600 to 290,000) for the families of deceased victims. Carso retained the right to seek reimbursement from those found legally responsible for the collapse and to take legal action against them. By February 2022, the remaining parties who had not accepted the compensation were pursuing legal action against Carso.

Sheinbaum and Ebrard were both candidates for MORENA in the 2024 presidential election. According to international journalists, the collapse could have impacted their presidential campaigns, as Ebrard oversaw the construction of Line 12, regarded as his signature infrastructure project, while Sheinbaum had over two years to address concerns about the line's condition and ensure its proper maintenance.
