= Eduardo Molina metro station =

Mexico City Metro station

Eduardo Molina
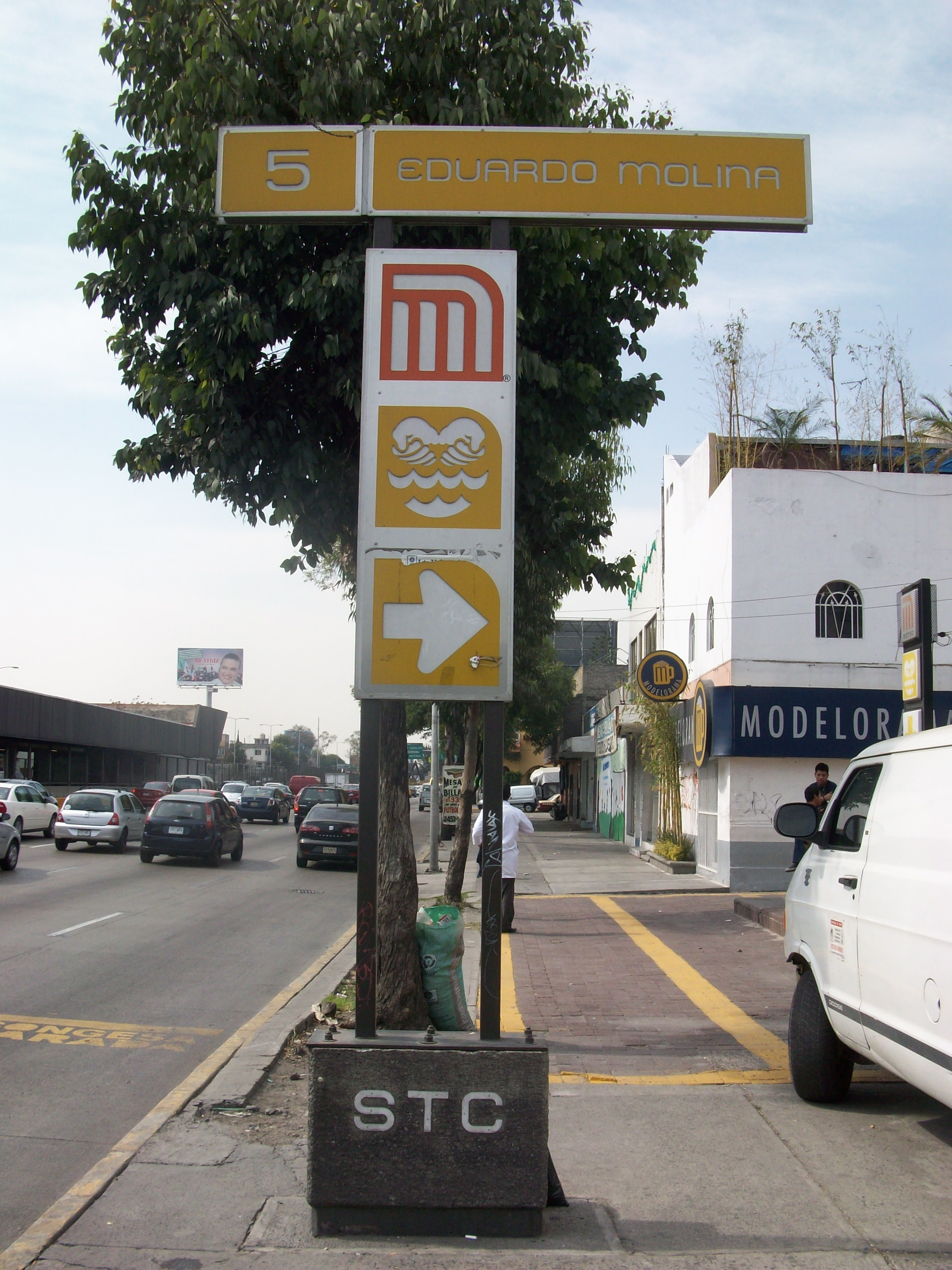
- Station sign, 2012

General information
- Location: Río Consulado Avenue; Gustavo A. Madero and Venustiano Carranza, Mexico City; Mexico
- Coordinates: 19°27′05″N 99°06′20″W
- System: Mexico City Metro
- Owner: Government of Mexico City
- Operator: Sistema de Transporte Colectivo (STC)
- Platforms: 1 island platform
- Tracks: 2
- Connections: Río Consulado; Route: 200; Route: 20-B

Construction
- Structure type: At grade

Other information
- Status: In service

History
- Opened: 19 December 1981; 44 years ago

Key dates
- 23 April 2020; 6 years ago: Temporarily closed
- 15 June 2020; 6 years ago: Reopened

Passengers
- 2025: 2,189,174 (Note: The system's website counts only passenger entries into stations and does not include passengers passing through, transferring between lines, or exiting the station. The data here is limited to the most recent ten years to avoid excessive listings; earlier figures can be found in this page's history or on the Mexico City Metro website. To calculate the average daily ridership, the annual total is divided by 365 days (366 in leap years), with decimals omitted from the result. Each station per line is ranked individually, as the system counts transfer stations separately. The percentage change is calculated automatically using the data from the current year and the previous year.) ▼4.93%
- Rank: 175/195

Services
Preceding station	Mexico City Metro	Following station
Consulado toward Politécnico	Line 5	Aragón toward Pantitlán
Route map
Location
- Location within Mexico City
- Area map and exits

Eduardo Molina metro station (Note: Estación del Metro Eduardo Molina. Spanish pronunciation: [eˈðwaɾðo mo'lina].) is a station of the Mexico City Metro in the city's boroughs of Gustavo A. Madero and Venustiano Carranza. It is an at-grade railway stop with one island platform serving Line 5 (Yellow Line), between Consulado and Aragón. It was opened on 19 December 1981, providing service west toward Consulado and east toward Pantitlán station.

Eduardo Molina metro station services the Colonias (neighborhoods) of 20 de Noviembre and Malinche, along Avenida Río Consulado. The station is named after Eduardo Molina, an engineer who helped solve the problem of water scarcity in the Valley of Mexico during the 1960s. The station's pictogram represents two hands holding water, as featured on the mural El agua, origen de la vida, painted by Mexican muralist Diego Rivera in the Cárcamo de Dolores, located in Chapultepec.

Outside, there are a few bus services in the area. In 2025, the metro station had an average daily ridership of 5,997 passenger entries, ranking it the 175th busiest stop in the network, making it one of the least-accessed stations in the system.

== Location and layout ==
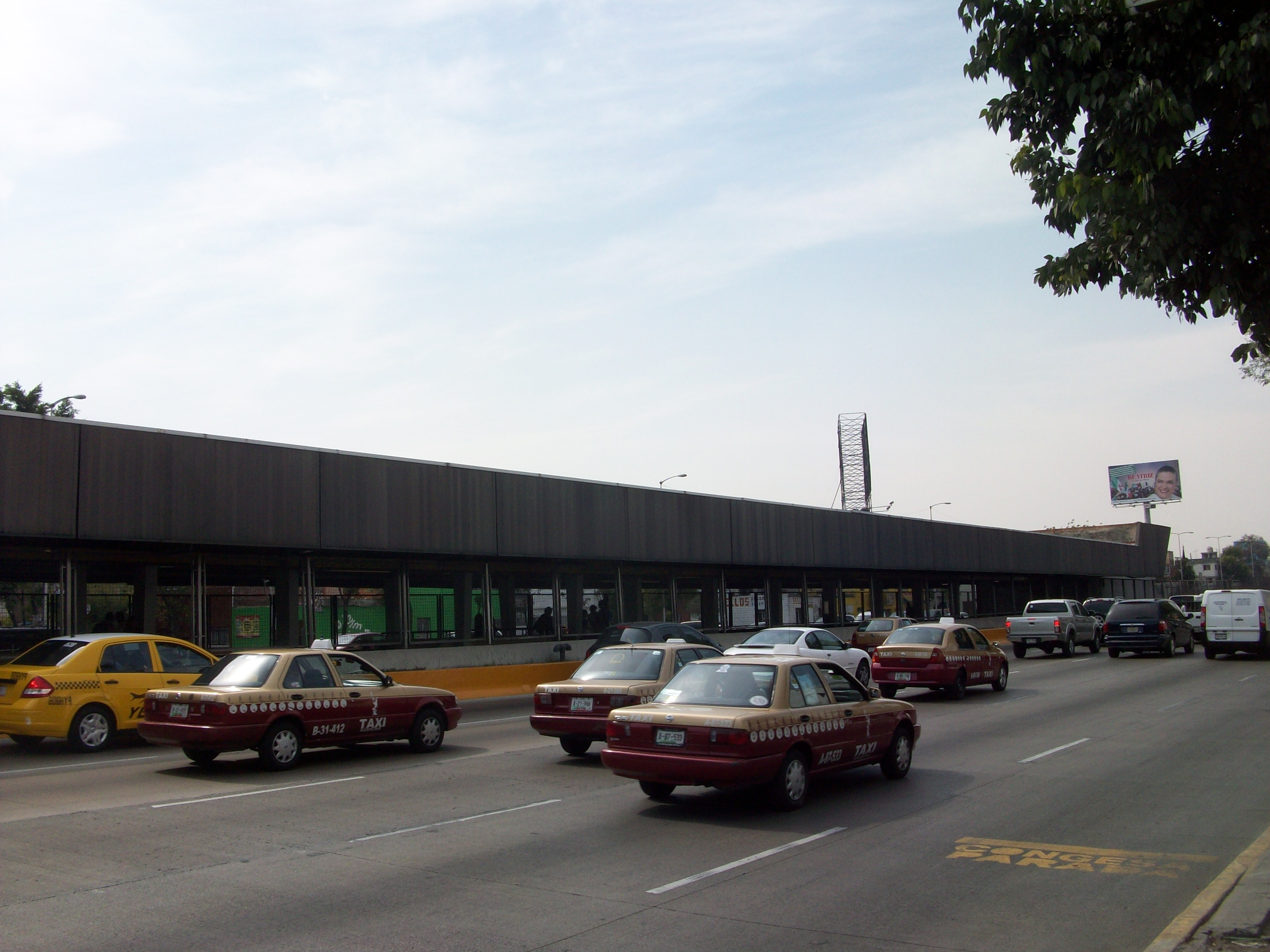
Eduardo Molina metro station lies next to the Río Consolado Avenue.

Eduardo Molina is an at-grade metro station on Line 5 along Circuito Interior, at the Avenida Río Consulado segment. The station is found in the limits of the boroughs of Gustavo A. Madero and Venustiano Carranza, in northeastern Mexico City. The station serves the Colonias ("neighborhoods") of Malinche, Gustavo A. Madero, and 20 de Noviembre, Venustiano Carranza. It has two exits leading to Circuito Interior: the northern exit serves Colonia Malinche at the corner of Calle Norte 86, while the southern exit serves Colonia 20 de Noviembre.

Within the system, Eduardo Molina metro station lies between Consulado and Aragón. The area is serviced by Routes 20-B of the city's public bus system, as well as Route 200 of the Red de Transporte de Pasajeros network. The Río Consulado bus stop on Line 5 of the Metrobús rapid transit system is located a few blocks away.

== History and construction ==
Line 5 of the Mexico City Metro was built by Cometro, a subsidiary of Empresas ICA. Its first section, which includes Eduardo Molina metro station, opened on 19 December 1981, running from Pantitlán to Consulado stations.

The section between Eduardo Molina and Consulado mesures 815 meters (2,674 ft), while the opposite section toward Aragón is 860 meters (2,820 ft) long.

=== Name and pictogram ===
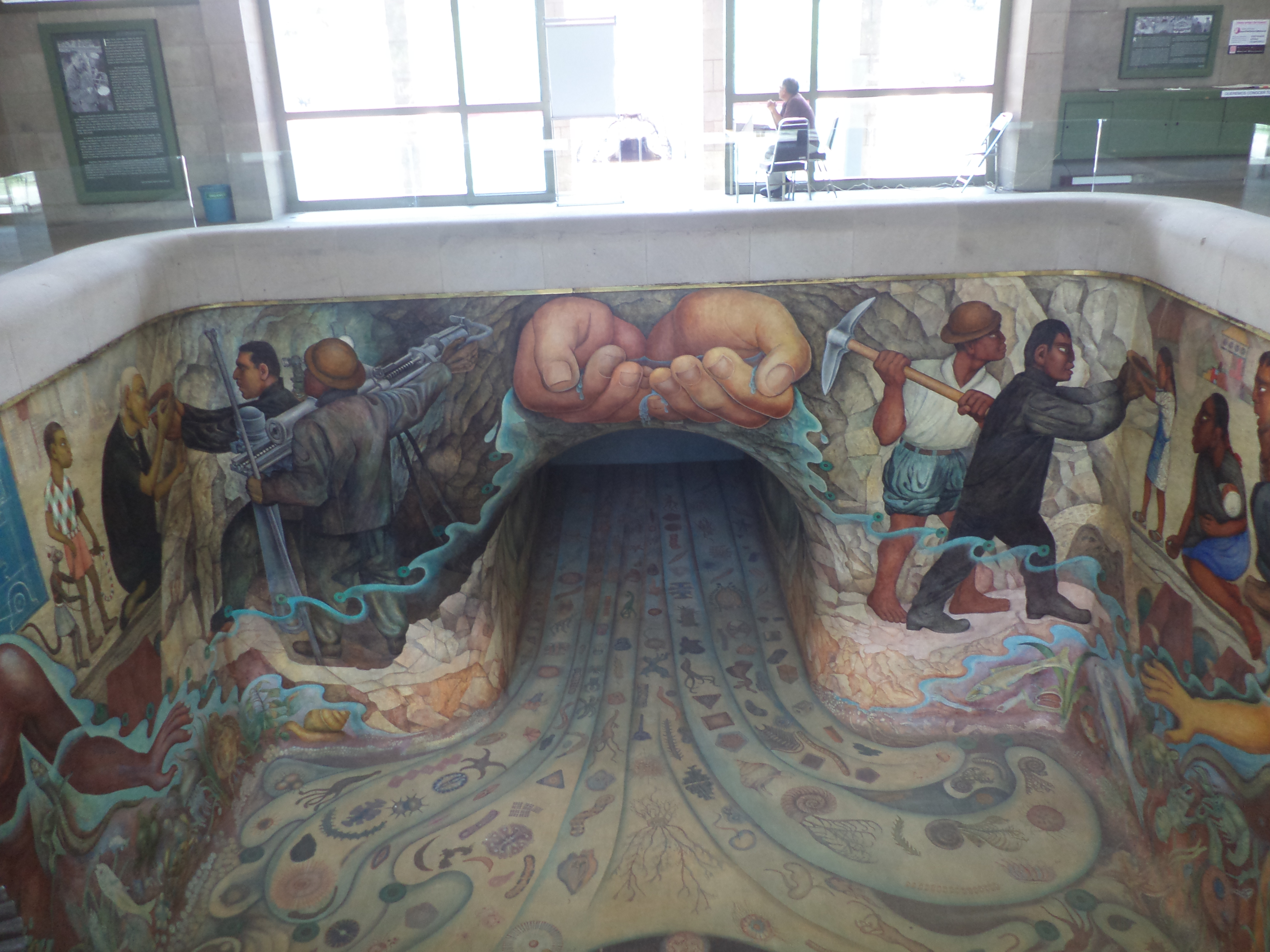
Eduardo Molina station's pictogram features a fragment of Diego Rivera's mural El agua, origen de la vida (detail pictured)

The station is named after Eduardo Molina, a Mexican engineer who helped address water scarcity in the Valley of Mexico during the 1960s through the Lerma River system. The station's pictogram features two hands holding water, referencing a fragment of the mural El agua, origen de la vida (lit. transl. Water, Origin of Life), painted by Diego Rivera inside the main building of the Cárcamo de Dolores, a hydraulic sump structure in Chapultepec, Mexico City.

=== Incidents ===
Eduardo Molina metro station was temporarily closed for repairs after the 2015 Oceanía metro station train crash. From 23 April to 15 June 2020, the station was temporarily closed due to the COVID-19 pandemic in Mexico.

== Ridership ==
Daily ridership for Eduardo Molina station in 2024

According to official data, before the impact of the COVID-19 pandemic, the station recorded between 6,800 and 7,100 average daily entries from 2016 to 2019. In 2025, it recorded 2,189,174 passenger entries, ranking 175th among the system's 195 stations.

Annual passenger ridership
Year	Ridership	Average daily	Rank	% change	Ref.
2025	2,189,174	5,997	175/195	−4.93%	
2024	2,302,701	6,291	162/195	+5.48%	
2023	2,183,048	5,980	153/195	+16.50%	
2022	1,873,834	5,133	155/195	+44.84%	
2021	1,293,750	3,544	161/195	+0.40%	
2020	1,288,544	3,520	177/195	−48.17%	
2019	2,486,165	6,811	176/195	−2.96%	
2018	2,561,895	7,018	175/195	+5.08%	
2017	2,437,928	6,979	173/195	−4.72%	
2016	2,558,663	7,010	174/195	−4.04%	
