= Mexico City Metro Line 5 =

Metro line in Mexico City

Line 5

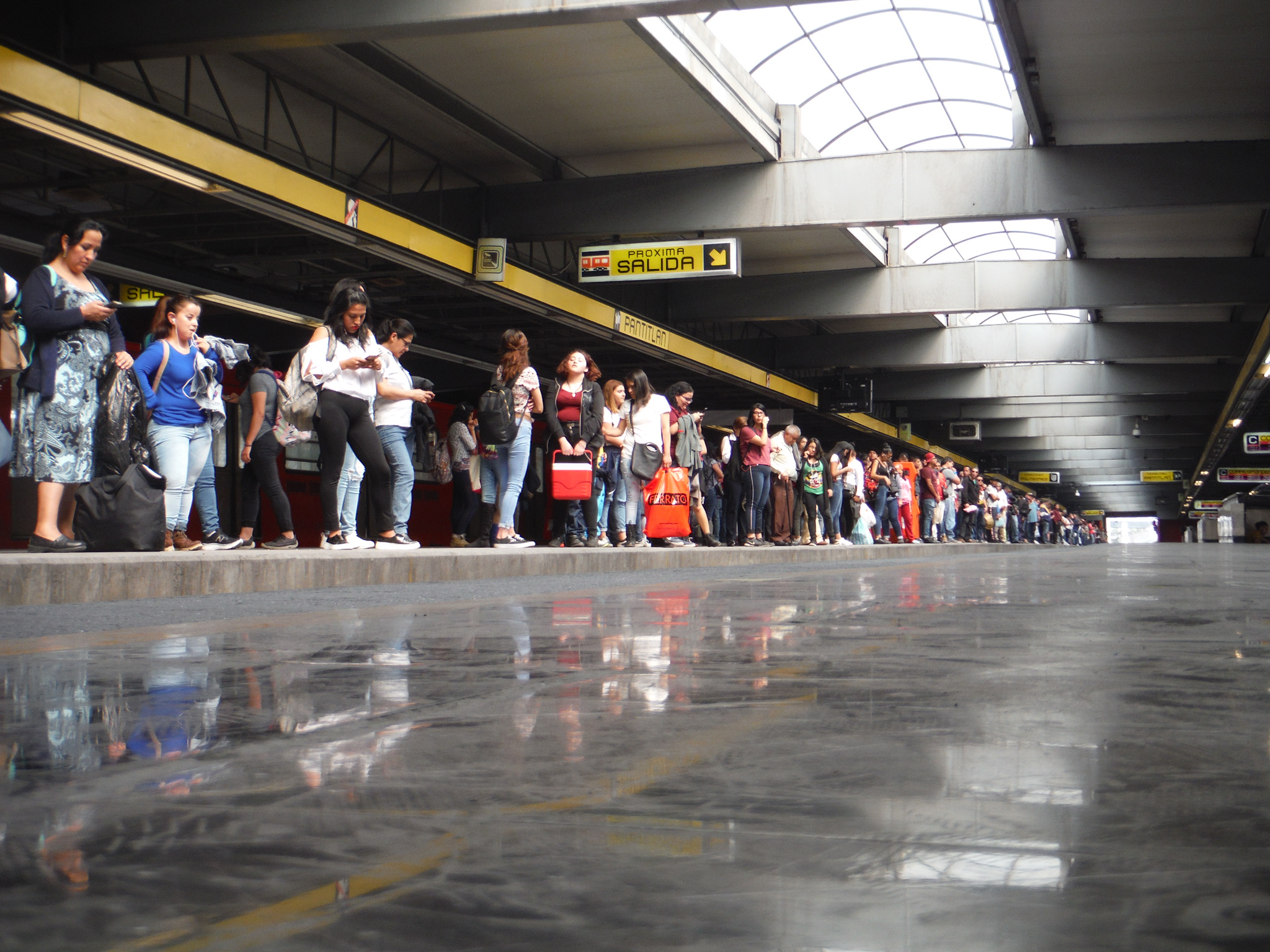
- Platforms at Pantitlán

Overview
- Other name: Yellow Line
- Locale: Mexico City
- Termini: Pantitlán; Politécnico
- Connecting lines: at Instituto del Petróleo; at La Raza; at Consulado; at Oceanía; at Pantitlán
- Stations: 13
- Website: metro.cdmx.gob.mx

Service
- Type: Rapid transit
- System: Mexico City Metro
- Operator(s): Sistema de Transporte Colectivo (STC)
- Rolling stock: MP-68, NM-73AR, MP-82
- Ridership: 59,639,476 (2024)

History
- Opened: 19 December 1981; 44 years ago
- Last extension: 1982

Technical
- Line length: 14.435 km (9.0 mi)
- Track length: 15.675 km (9.7 mi)
- Number of tracks: 2
- Character: At-grade and underground
- Track gauge: 1,435 mm (4 ft 8 1/2 in) standard gauge with roll ways along track
- Electrification: Guide bar, 750 V DC
- Operating speed: 36 km/h (22 mph)
Route map
Line 5 route highlighted in gray

Line 5, also known as the Yellow Line from its color on the system map, is a rapid transit line of the Mexico City Metro network. It travels 15.6 kilometers (9.7 mi) along the boroughs of Gustavo A. Madero, Cuauhtémoc and Venustiano Carranza in northern, northeastern and eastern Mexico City, serving thirteen stations. The line was inaugurated on 19 December 1981, going from Pantitlán to Consulado station. In 1982, the line was expanded twice, first from Consulado to La Raza station on 1 July, and later from La Raza to Politécnico station on 30 August.

Line 5 was built by Mexican construction company Empresas ICA and it runs at grade and underground levels. The interchange stations are Instituto del Petróleo (Line 6), La Raza (Line 3), Consulado (Line 4), Oceanía (Line B), and Pantitlán (Lines 1, 9 and A). The line serves the Mexico City International Airport (AICM) at Terminal Aérea station and connects with other transport systems in the city, including the trolleybus, the Metrobús and the Mexibús systems.

In 2019, Line 5 had a total ridership of 86,512,999 passengers, averaging 237,021 passengers per day and making it one of the least used lines on the network.

== History and construction ==
Line 5 of the Mexico City Metro was built in early 1980s by Cometro, a subsidiary of Empresas ICA. The line was inaugurated on 19 December 1981 and originally ran from Pantitlán (in Venustiano Carranza) to Consulado station (in the limits of Venustiano Carranza and Gustavo A. Madero), with seven operative stations and a 9.154 kilometers (5.688 mi) long track. Pantitlán, Oceanía, Aragón, Eduardo Molina and Consulado stations were built at-grade level, while Hangares and Terminal Aérea were built underground. Between Consulado and Eduardo Molina a station named Simón Bolivar was planned but never built due to budget constraints.

The line was expanded northbound to La Raza station, in Gustavo A. Madero, slightly passing through the Cuauhtémoc borough at Misterios station. Valle Gómez and Misterios stations were built underground, while La Raza was built at-grade level. The expansion was opened on 1 July 1982. The second and last expansion was northbound toward Politécnico station, in Gustavo A. Madero with all the stations built at grade, and it was opened on 30 August 1982.

During the early excavations, a road that connected Tenochtitlan with the Tepeyac hill was found in the Valle Gómez–Misterios stretch. The road was built with materials dated from the Mesoamerican Postclassic Period. In Peñon de los Baños (near Terminal Aérea station), workers found the remains of mamuts, bisons, horses, camels, birds and fishes, as well as a Teotihuacan settlement.

In 2015, during an evening with heavy rain and hail, two trains crashed while both were going toward Politécnico station. One person indirectly died and twelve others resulted injured. In 2021, the whole line ceased operations for three days after a fire occurred on the STC's Central Control Center.

=== Planned expansion ===
During the 1980s and 1990s, it was proposed to expand Line 5 northbound to the municipality of Tlalnepantla de Baz, in the State of Mexico. The expansion was proposed again for the 2018 master plan, and if built it would connect with the Tren Suburbano's Tlalnepantla Station.

== Rolling stock ==
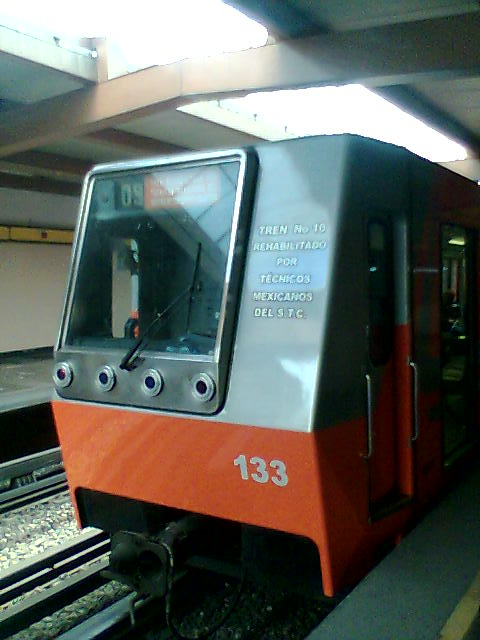
A restored NM-73 train on Line 5

Line 5 has had different types of rolling stock. As of August 2021, 25 trains are operating in the line, with a combination of MP-68 (coded as MP-68R93) and NM-73 (coded as NM-73AR) rubber-tired metro trains. The MP-68 trains were built in 1968 in France by Alstom and they were modeled after the MP 59 trains on the Paris Metro. With a service life of 25 years, all the MP-68 trains were restored and refurbished by Bombardier in 1993. The second type, the NM-73 model, were built in 1973 in Mexico by Concarril with the supervision of Alstom. Both models received further restoration works in 2016.

Other models that have operated at Line 5 and have been removed from circulation there include the MP-68R96C, the NM-79, the NC-82 and the NM-83.

== Route ==
Politécnico station, the northern terminus of the line, lies next to Eje Central Avenue (at the section named 100 Metros Avenue), near the National Polytechnic Institute main campus. The line heads southeast along the avenue to Instituto del Petróleo station, serving the Mexican Petroleum Institute. The track continues to Autobuses del Norte station, located next to the city's Northern Bus Terminal. As the line reaches La Raza station, it moves from Eje Central to Circuito Interior (at the section named Río Consulado Avenue), entering the first tunnel toward two underground stations: Misterios, near Calzada de los Misterios Avenue, and Valle Gómez, in the neighborhood of the same name.

The line goes back to the surface to avoid a conflict with the underground Consulado River and reaches Consulado station. It continues along the avenue to Eduardo Molina and Aragón stations until the intersection of Circuito Interior and Oceanía Avenue where Oceanía station is located. Circuito Interior changes its section name from Río Consulado Avenue to Puerto Aéreo Boulevard. From there, the line goes under another tunnel toward Terminal Aérea station, which serves the city's airport. The track moves from Puerto Aéreo Boulevard to Eje 1 Norte, at the section named Fuerza Aérea Avenue, and arrives at Hangares station, located next to the airport's hangars. The line continues and leaves the tunnel; Eje 1 Norte changes to the next section, named Miguel Lebrija Avenue, and reaches the southeastern terminal of Pantitlán, where it connects with three other metro lines.

== Station list ==
Key (Note: The following list was adapted from different websites and official maps.: Metro connections obtained from the official Mexico City Metro system map.; Accessibility obtained from the Mexico City Metro system map. In some cases, the map omits the accessibility icon as the station(s) are actually partially accessible. However, the respective websites of each station on the official site indicate the respective accessibility methods. Stations with the symbol ‡ are fully accessible; stations with the symbol † are partially accessible.; Cablebús obtained from their official website.; Centro de transferencia modal (CETRAM;) obtained from the official website of the Órgano Regulador de Transporte.; Ecobici obtained from their official website.; Metrobús obtained from the Mexico City Metrobús system map.; Mexibús obtained from the official Mexico City Metro system map.; Mexicable obtained from the official Mexico City Metro system map.; Public buses network (peseros) obtained from the official website of the Órgano Regulador de Transporte.; Red de Transporte de Pasajeros obtained from their official website.; Trolleybuses obtained from their official website.)
Handicapped/disabled access	Fully accessible station	Cablebús Line {{{3}}}	Cablebús connection	Red de Transporte de Pasajeros	RTP connection
Handicapped/disabled access	Partially accessible station	Mexibús	Mexibús connection	Tren Interurbano	Tren Interurbano connection
Transfer hub	CETRAM transfer station	Mexicable	Mexicable connection	Tren Suburbano	Tren Suburbano connection
Transfer hub	ETRAM transfer station	Mexico City Metro	Mexico City Metro connection	Trolleybus	Trolleybus connection
Ecobici	Ecobici bikeshare	Mexico City minubus	Pesero connection	Xochimilco Light Rail	Xochimilco Light Rail connection

Station	Handicapped/disabled access	Opened	Level	Distance (km)		Connections	Location
Station	Handicapped/disabled access	Opened	Level	Between stations	Total	Connections	Location
Politécnico	Handicapped/disabled access	30 August 1982	Ground-level	—N/a	0.0	23, 103; 3A, Z1E, Z1H, Z1I, Z1J	Gustavo A. Madero
Instituto del Petróleo		30 August 1982	Ground-level	1.3	1.3	23, 27A, 103	Gustavo A. Madero
Autobuses del Norte	Handicapped/disabled access	30 August 1982	Ground-level	1.2	2.5	North Bus Terminal; 23, 103; 15A	Gustavo A. Madero
La Raza	Handicapped/disabled access	1 July 1982	Ground-level	1.1	3.7	(at Norte 1-G); 23, 27A, 103; 20C, 20D, Z1G, Z1M, Z1N, Z1Ñ, Z1O	Gustavo A. Madero
Misterios		1 July 1982	Underground	1.0	4.7	(at Río Consulado); 200; 20A	Gustavo A. Madero/ Cuauhtémoc
Valle Gómez		1 July 1982	Underground	1.2	5.9	200; 20A	Gustavo A. Madero/ Venustiano Carranza
Consulado		19 December 1981	Ground-level	0.8	6.7	37; 5A, 20A, 20B	Gustavo A. Madero/ Venustiano Carranza
Eduardo Molina		19 December 1981	Ground-level	0.9	7.6	200; 20B	Gustavo A. Madero/ Venustiano Carranza
Aragón		19 December 1981	Ground-level	1.0	8.6	200; 20B	Gustavo A. Madero/ Venustiano Carranza
Oceanía	Handicapped/disabled access	19 December 1981	Ground-level	1.4	10.0	43, 200; 10D, 20B	Venustiano Carranza
Terminal Aérea		19 December 1981	Underground	1.2	11.3	Mexico City Airport; Aerotren (at Terminal 1); (at Terminal 1); 43, 200; 20B	Venustiano Carranza
Hangares		19 December 1981	Underground	1.4	12.6	11C	Venustiano Carranza
Pantitlán	Handicapped/disabled access	19 December 1981	Ground-level	1.8	14.4	168; 11B, 11C, 19F, 19G	Venustiano Carranza

=== Pictograms ===
Top, from left to right: Pantitlán, Hangares, Terminal Aérea, Oceanía Center top, from left to right: Aragón, Eduardo Molina, Consulado, Valle Gómez Center bottom, from left to right: Misterios, La Raza, Autobuses del Norte, Instituto del Petróleo Bottom: Politécnico

Like the rest of the system, Line 5 stations have pictograms. Most of them allude to elements surrounding their respective areas. The term "Pantitlán", which derives from the Nahuatl "between flags" and has pre-Hispanic origins, refers to the region in which flags were erected to mark specific locations of Lake Texcoco where boat navigation was hazardous due to the rapid currents. Hangares features a biplane inside a hangar since it is located adjacent to the Mexico City International Airport's hangars. Terminal Aérea displays a control tower and an airliner to reference the airport's main metro station. Oceanía is named after Oceanía Avenue; thus, the authorities selected a kangaroo to represent the continent.

Aragón station shows a squirrel, an animal typically found in parks. At the time of its opening, the station was the closest to San Juan de Aragón Park. Eduardo Molina station is named after the namesake avenue and its pictogram features two hands holding water, referencing the mural El agua, origen de la vida by Diego Rivera, painted inside the main building of the Cárcamo de Dolores, a hydraulic sump designed by Ricardo Rivas and Eduardo Molina. The logo for Consulado station depicts a water duct, representing the ducted part of the underground river of the same name. Valle Gómez station is named after the namesake neighborhood, where agave plants grew.

Misterios station is named after the Calzada de los Misterios Avenue, whose main attractions are multiple hermitages featuring the Mysteries of the Rosary; the station is represented by one of those buildings. La Raza station's logo represents the Monumento a la Raza pyramid, found nearby the station. Autobuses del Norte station displays an intercity bus as it is adjacent to the city's North Bus station. Instituto del Petróleo is named after the Mexican Petroleum Institute headquarters and it is represented by an oil derrick. Politécnico station is found near the National Polytechnic Institute; thus, it displays a stylized version of the institution's logotype.

== Ridership ==
According to the data provided by the authorities since the 2000s, Line 5 is one of the least used of the system. In 2019, the line registered 86,512,999 entrances, averaging 237,021 commuters per day. Pantitlán is the busiest station on the line—and one of the busiest of the system—averaging 100,260 entrances that year; in contrast, Consulado, Hangares and Valle Gómez stations averaged fewer than 5,000 passengers per day and consistently rank among the least used on the Metro network.

Line 5 annual passenger ridership (2014–2023)
Year	Ridership	Average daily	% change	Ref.
2023	59,894,845	164,095	+0.62%	
2022	59,523,338	163,077	+21.25%	
2021	49,090,953	134,495	+0.56%	
2020	48,816,889	133,379	−43.57%	
2019	86,512,999	237,021	−0.94%	
2018	87,336,862	239,279	+4.33%	
2017	83,712,705	229,349	−1.23%	
2016	84,752,993	231,565	−0.37%	
2015	85,067,083	233,060	+1.83%	
2014	83,535,630	228,864	−0.92%	

Annual passenger ridership by station (2019)
Rank	System rank	Station	Total ridership	Average daily
1	4	Pantitlán†‡	36,594,748	100,260
2	28	Politécnico‡	12,624,212	34,587
3	68	Autobuses del Norte	8,280,147	22,685
4	96	Terminal Aérea	6,712,062	18,389
5	155	La Raza†	3,578,110	9,803
6	161	Oceanía†	3,129,656	8,574
7	164	Misterios	2,953,802	8,093
8	172	Aragón	2,754,754	7,547
9	176	Eduardo Molina	2,486,165	6,811
10	180	Instituto del Petróleo†	2,215,325	6,069
11	187	Consulado†	1,799,502	4,930
12	188	Hangares	1,772,609	4,856
13	189	Valle Gómez	1,611,907	4,416
Total			86,512,999	237,021

†	Transfer station
‡	Terminal
†‡	Transfer station and terminal

== See also ==
- List of Mexico City Metro lines
