= Aragón metro station =

Mexico City Metro station

Aragón
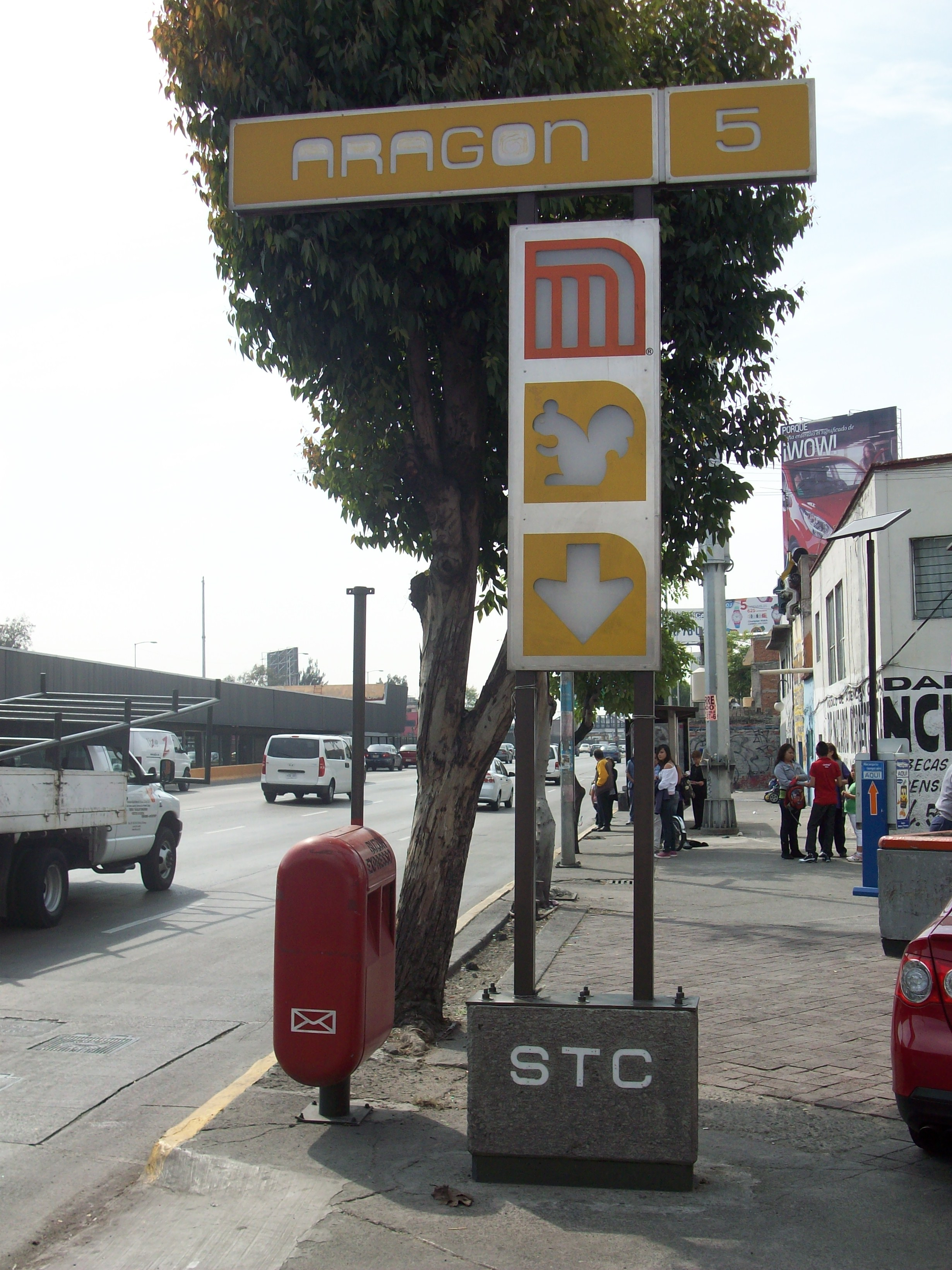
- Station sign, 2012

General information
- Location: Río Consulado Avenue; Gustavo A. Madero and Venustiano Carranza, Mexico City; Mexico
- Coordinates: 19°27′04″N 99°05′45″W
- System: Mexico City Metro
- Owner: Government of Mexico City
- Operator: Sistema de Transporte Colectivo (STC)
- Platforms: 1 island platform
- Tracks: 2
- Connections: Route: 200; Route: 20-B

Construction
- Structure type: At grade

Other information
- Status: In service

History
- Opened: 19 December 1981; 44 years ago

Key dates
- 23 April 2020; 6 years ago: Temporarily closed
- 15 June 2020; 6 years ago: Reopened

Passengers
- 2025: 2,242,171 (Note: The system's website counts only passenger entries into stations and does not include passengers passing through, transferring between lines, or exiting the station. The data here is limited to the most recent ten years to avoid excessive listings; earlier figures can be found in this page's history or on the Mexico City Metro website. To calculate the average daily ridership, the annual total is divided by 365 days (366 in leap years), with decimals omitted from the result. Each station per line is ranked individually, as the system counts transfer stations separately. The percentage change is calculated automatically using the data from the current year and the previous year.) ▼0.7%
- Rank: 172/195

Services
Preceding station	Mexico City Metro	Following station
Eduardo Molina toward Politécnico	Line 5	Oceanía toward Pantitlán
Route map
Location
- Location within Mexico City
- Area map and exits

Aragón metro station (Note: Estación del Metro Aragón. Spanish pronunciation: [aɾaˈɣon].) is a Mexico City Metro station within the limits of Gustavo A. Madero and Venustiano Carranza, in Mexico City. It is an at-grade station with one island platform, serving Line 5 (Yellow Line), between Eduardo Molina and Oceanía stations. Aragón metro station was inaugurated on 19 December 1981, providing northwestward service toward Consulado and eastward service toward Pantitlán.

The station services the colonias of Casas Alemán and Simón Bolívar, along Avenida Río Consulado. Aragon metro station is named after the San Juan de Aragón Park public park and zoo. The pictogram for the station features a squirrel. In 2019, the station had an average daily ridership of 7,547 passengers, ranking it the 172nd busiest station in the network.

== Location and layout ==
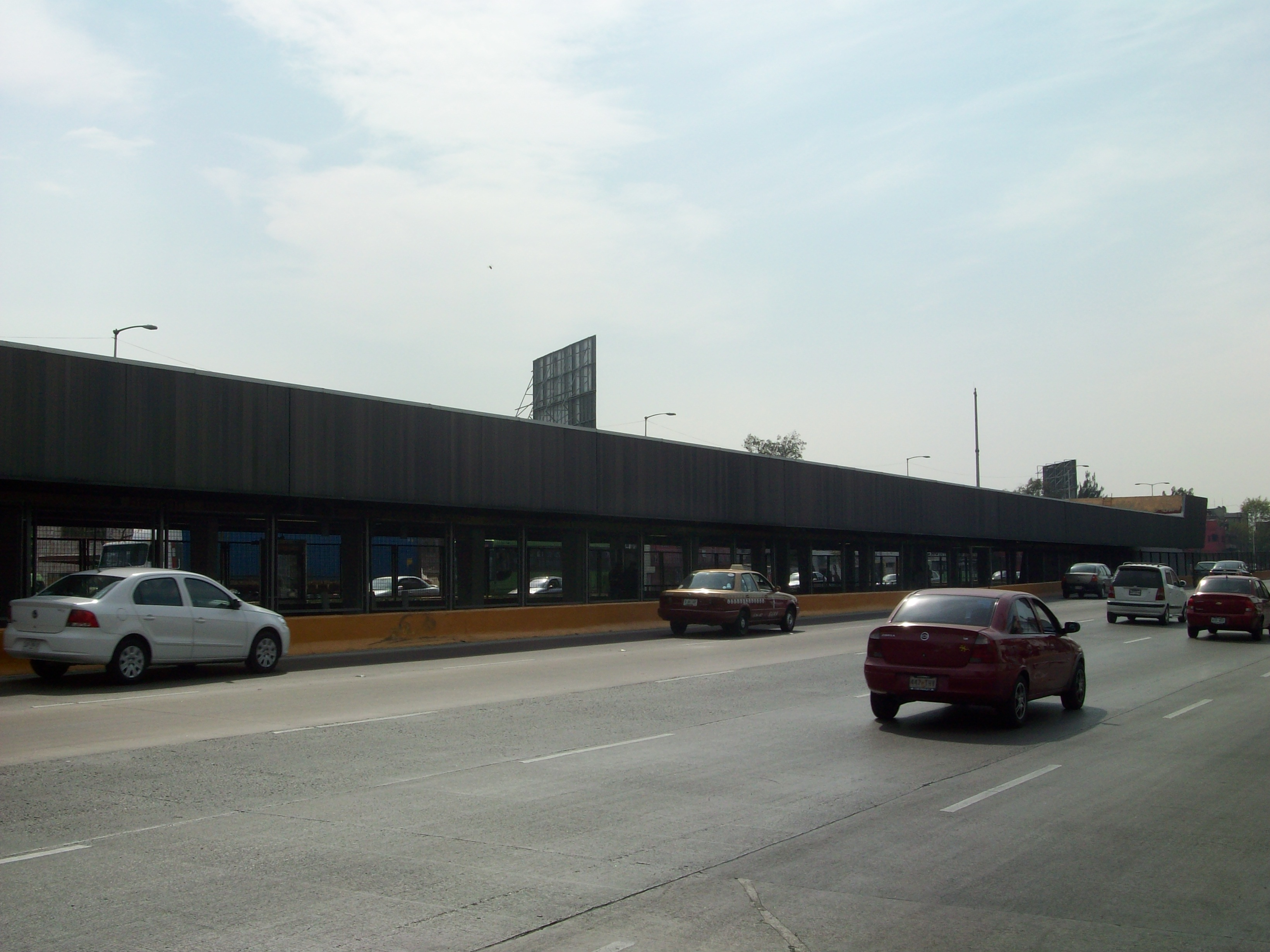
Aragón station (pictured) lies next to the Río Consolado Avenue

Aragón is an at-grade metro station on Line 5 along Circuito Interior, at the Avenida Río Consulado segment. The station is found in the limits of the boroughs of Gustavo A. Madero and Venustiano Carranza, in northeastern Mexico City. The station serves the Colonias ("neighborhoods") of Casas Alemán, Gustavo A. Madero, and Simón Bolívar, Venustiano Carranza. It has two exits leading to Circuito Interior: the northern exit serves Colonia Casas Alemán at the corner of Calle Dólares, while the southern exit serves Colonia Simón Bolívar, at the corner of Calle Peniques.

Within the system, the station lies between Eduardo Molina and Oceanía. Route 20-B of the city's public bus system and Route 200 of the Red de Transporte de Pasajeros network service the area.

== History and construction ==
Line 5 of the Mexico City Metro was built by Cometro, a subsidiary of Empresas ICA. Its first section, which includes Aragó metro station, opened on 19 December 1981, running from Pantitlán to Consulado stations.

The section between Aragón and Eduardo Molina mesures 860 meters (2,820 ft), while the opposite section toward Oceanía is 1,219 meters (3,999 ft) long. The latter section has reported subsidence issues.

=== Name and pictogram ===
The pictogram for Aragón metro station depicts the silhouette of a squirrel, symbolizing its proximity to the San Juan de Aragón Park public park and zoo, as it was the closest station to the park when it opened. The Bosque de Aragón metro station later replaced this function.

=== Incidents ===
Aragón metro station was temporarily closed for repairs after the 2015 Oceanía metro station train crash. From 23 April to 15 June 2020, the station was temporarily closed due to the COVID-19 pandemic in Mexico.

== Ridership ==
Daily ridership for Aragón station in 2024

According to official data, before the impact of the COVID-19 pandemic, the station recorded between 7,100 and 7,600 average daily entries from 2016 to 2019. In 2025, it recorded 2,242,171 passenger entries, ranking 172nd among the system's 195 stations.

Annual passenger ridership
Year	Ridership	Average daily	Rank	% change	Ref.
2025	2,242,171	6,142	172/195	−0.70%	
2024	2,257,969	6,169	163/195	−0.60%	
2023	2,271,668	6,223	152/195	+6.42%	
2022	2,134,549	5,848	150/195	+32.94%	
2021	1,605,655	4,399	153/195	+11.99%	
2020	1,433,746	3,917	174/195	−47.95%	
2019	2,754,754	7,547	172/195	+0.78%	
2018	2,733,501	7,489	171/195	+4.17%	
2017	2,624,161	7,189	171/195	+0.17%	
2016	2,619,656	7,157	172/195	−1.89%	
