= Oceanía metro station =

Mexico City Metro station

Oceanía
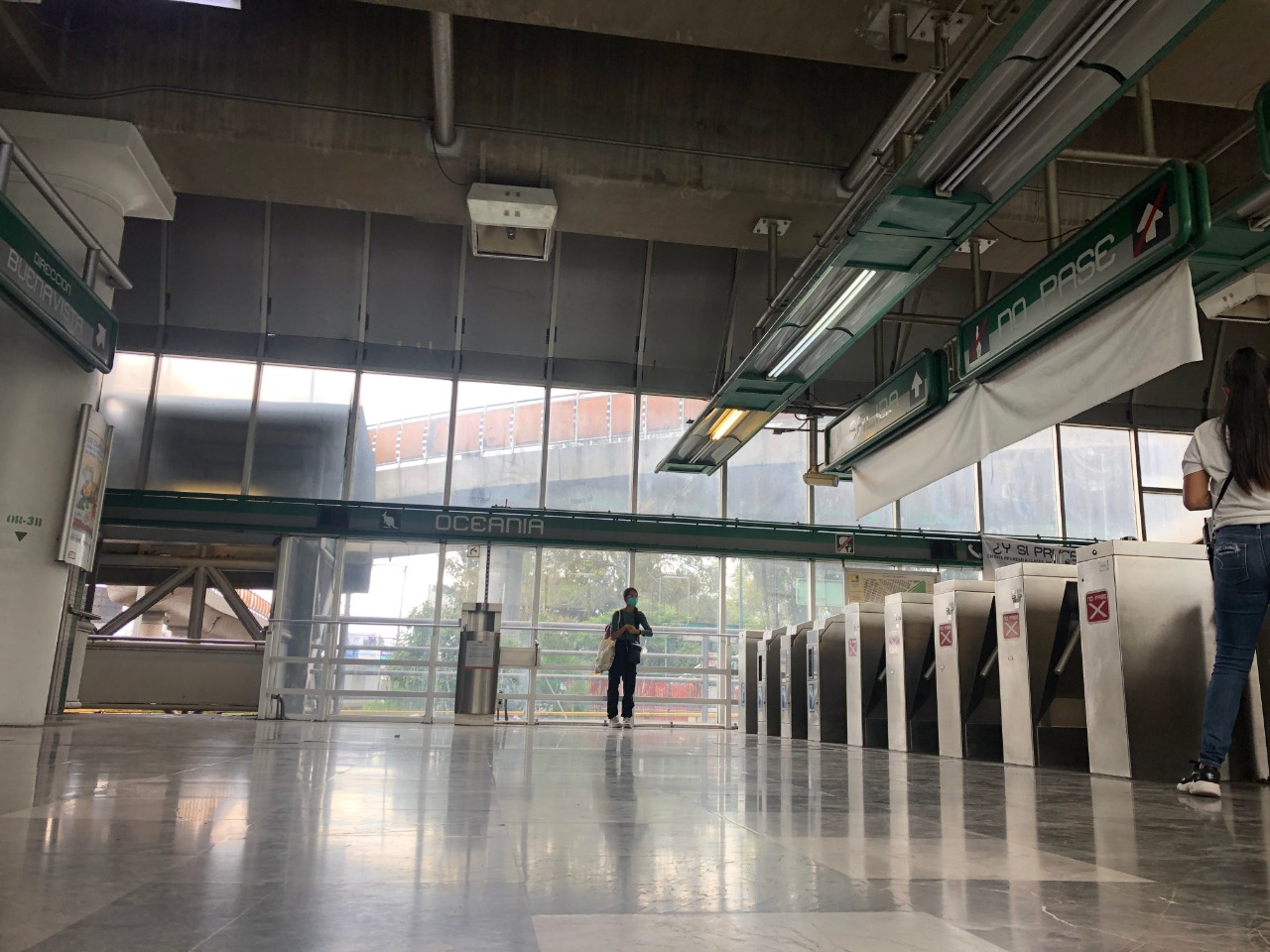
- Line B lobby, 2021

General information
- Location: Circuito Interior and Avenida Oceanía; Venustiano Carranza, Mexico City; Mexico
- Coordinates: 19°26′44″N 99°05′14″W
- System: Mexico City Metro
- Owner: Government of Mexico City
- Operator: Sistema de Transporte Colectivo (STC)
- Platforms: 1 island platform; 2 side platforms
- Tracks: 4
- Connections: Routes: 43, 200; Trolleybus Line 4: Oceanía; Routes: 10-D, 20-B

Construction
- Structure type: At grade; Elevated
- Accessible: Partial

Other information
- Status: In service

History
- Opened: 19 December 1981; 44 years ago; 15 December 1999; 26 years ago

Passengers
- 2025: 5,417,560 (Note: The Mexico City Metro system counts the entries from interchange stations separately. Individually, Line 5 saw 2,666,169 passengers, while Line B recorded 2,751,391 passengers.) (Note: The system's website counts only passenger entries into stations and does not include passengers passing through, transferring between lines, or exiting the station. The data here is limited to the most recent ten years to avoid excessive listings; earlier figures can be found in this page's history or on the Mexico City Metro website. To calculate the average daily ridership, the annual total is divided by 365 days (366 in leap years), with decimals omitted from the result. Each station per line is ranked individually, as the system counts transfer stations separately. The percentage change is calculated automatically using the data from the current year and the previous year.) ▼8.32%
- Rank: 159/195; 156/195

Services
Preceding station	Mexico City Metro	Following station
Aragón toward Politécnico	Line 5	Terminal Aérea toward Pantitlán
Deportivo Oceanía toward Ciudad Azteca	Line B	Romero Rubio toward Buenavista
Route map
Location
- Location within Mexico City
- Area map and exits

Oceanía metro station (Note: Estación del Metro Oceanía. Spanish pronunciation: [oseaˈni.a]. The name of the station literally means "Oceania" in Spanish.) is a transfer station on the Mexico City Metro in Venustiano Carranza, Mexico City. Oceanía is a combined elevated and at-grade station divided into two lines. It serves Lines 5 (Yellow Line) and B (Green-and-Gray Line). Line 5 has one island platform while Line B two side platforms. Oceanía metro station is located between Aragón and Terminal Aérea stations on Line 5, and between Deportivo Oceanía and Romero Rubio stations on Line B. The stop serves the Colonias (neighborhoods) of Pensador Mexicano and Aquiles Serdán. The Line 5 building is situated along Circuito Interior, while the Line B station is above Avenida Oceanía.

Oceanía metro station opened on 19 December 1981 on Line 5 as part of the inaugurated service from Pantitlán to Consulado. Service on Line B began on 15 December 1999, providing service to Villa de Aragón and Buenavista. The pictogram representing Oceanía metro station depicts a kangaroo, symbolizing Avenida Oceanía with a representative animal from the continent Oceania.

Since its opening, Oceanía metro station has experienced several incidents, including two unrelated fake bomb threats and a train crash, where one person indirectly died and twelve others were injured.

In 2025, Oceanía served 5,417,560 passenger entries. The station facilities are partially accessible to people with disabilities including tactile paving and braille signage plates.

== Location and layout ==
Line 5 platforms along Río Consulado in 2026, seen toward Terminal Aérea station

Oceanía is a transfer metro station, located in the Colonias (neighborhoods) of Pensador Mexicano and Aquiles Serdán, in Venustiano Carranza borough, northeastern Mexico City. The stop is situated along the median strip of Circuito Interior, in the section named Avenida Río Consulado (Line 5) and situated above Avenida Oceanía (Line B).

Within the system, Oceanía metro station is followed by Aragón and Terminal Aérea stations on Line 5 and Deportivo Oceanía and Romero Rubio stations on Line B. The station has four exits: to the north, at the intersection of Calle Norte 174 and Calle Río Blanco, and to the southeast, on Avenida Río Consulado, both serving Colonia Pensador Mexicano on Line 5; to the north, at the intersection of Avenida Río Consulado and Calle Norte 170, Colonia Pensador Mexicano, and to the south, at the intersection of Avenida Oceanía and Calle Dinares, serving Colonia Aquiles Serdán station on Line B.

The area is serviced by Line 4 (formerly Line G) of the trolleybus system, by Routes 43 and 200 of the Red de Transporte de Pasajeros network, and by Routes 10-D and 20-B of the city's public bus system.

At 76.6 meters (251 ft), the passenger transfer overpass that connects Line 5 with Line B is the shortest in the system, and, according to Roberto Remes, director of Ciudad Humana MX, a sustainable mobility non-governmental organization, it is too narrow and potentially dangerous for riders during rush hours. The station facilities are partially accessible to people with disabilities as there are tactile paving and braille signage plates.

== History and construction ==
=== Name and pictogram ===
The pictogram depicting Oceanía metro station shows the silhouette of a kangaroo, a representative animal from Oceania. The station's name references the avenue where it lies.

=== Line 5 ===
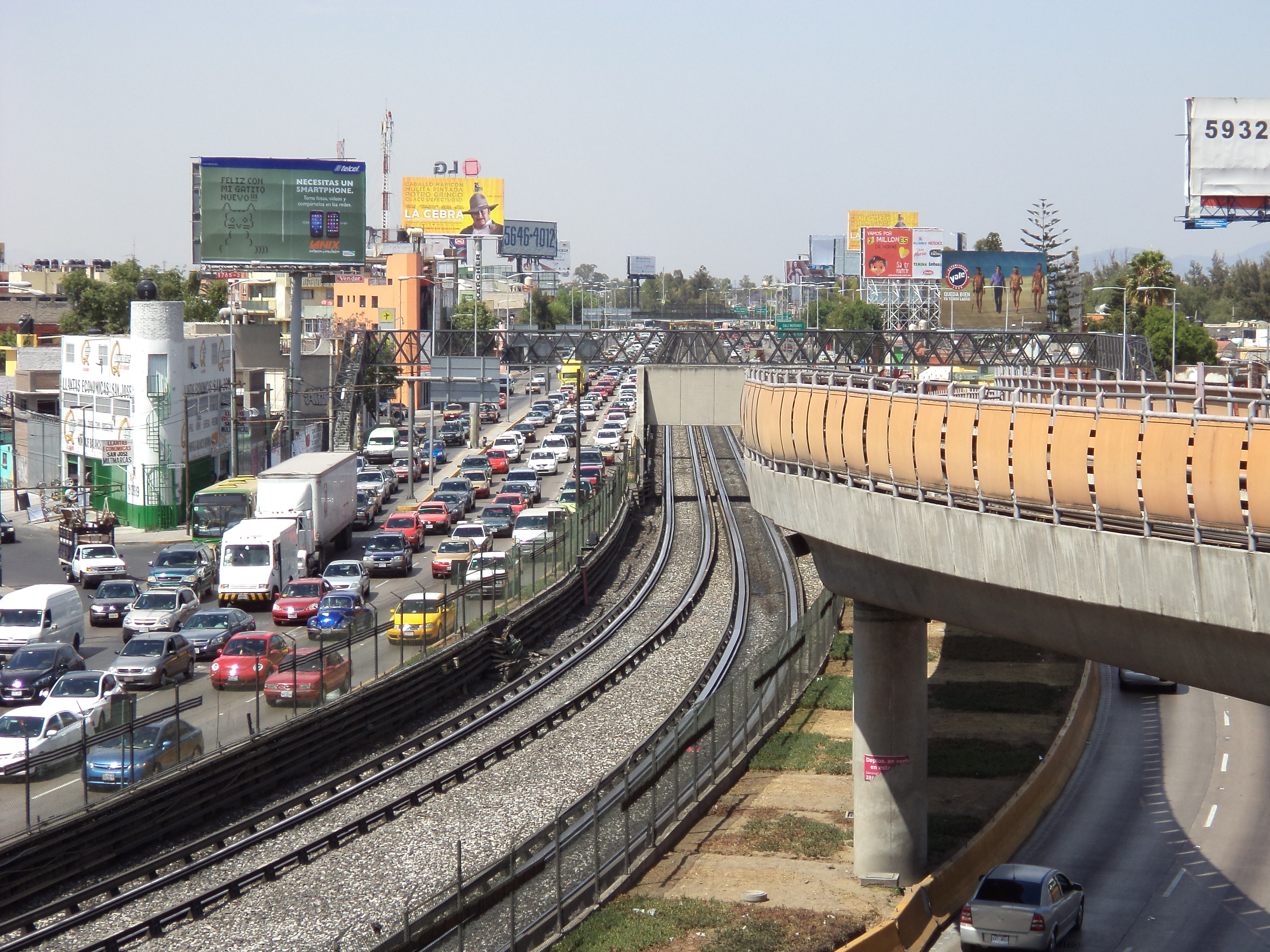
The system's interchange tracks for Lines 5 and B

The line was built Cometro, a subsidiary of Empresas ICA. The station was opened on 19 December 1981, providing service westward toward Consulado station and eastward toward Pantitlán station station.

The line's span between Oceanía and Aragón is 1,229 meters (4,032 ft) long, and presents subsidence in the tracks. The opposite section toward Terminal Aérea measures 1,174 meters (3,852 ft), and goes from the street level to the underground level. The track had a 4.9% slope when it was opened.

In 2008, Metro authorities had maintenance work done on the station's roof.

=== Line B ===
The line was built by Empresas ICA. Its first sectionn opened on 15 December 1999, providing service from Buenavista to Villa de Aragón.

The interstation section between Oceanía and Deportivo Oceanía stations is 863 m (2,831 ft), going from the street level to the overground one. The section toward Romero Rubio is 890 meters (2,920 ft) long.

=== Incidents ===
==== 2015 train crash ====
On 4 May 2015, at around 18:00 local time (23:00 UTC) during heavy rain with hail, two trains crashed while both were going toward Politécnico station. The first train, No. 4, was parked at the end of Oceanía station's platform after the driver reported that a plywood board was obstructing the tracks. The second train, No. 5, left Terminal Aérea station with the autopilot turned on despite the driver being asked to turn it off and to operate the train manually, as the protocol requires when it rains because trains have to run at reduced speed. Train No. 5 crashed into Train No. 4 at 31.8 km/h (19.8 mph), double the average on arrival at the platforms, and left twelve people injured.

According to the driver, the train began to slide because of the rain and hail; when he noticed, he tried to brake and then to deactivate the autopilot. As both actions failed, he contacted the Central Control Center to ask it to cut the power. The Center did not reply and, as he realized the train would impact the parked one, he decided to jump out of the cab before the crash.

The train event recorder stated that the train had reached 54.66 km/h (33.96 mph) at the Oceanía–Terminal Aérea slope, whose gradient had increased to at least 7% since its opening, and the driver did brake, reducing the speed to 49.7 km/h (30.9 mph), but the braking was ineffective as the tracks were wet and the slope increased the speed to 53.6 km/h (33.3 mph).

The Metro system director, Joel Ortega, concluded that the accident was mainly a consequence of a "double human error"; the first one caused by the driver, who did not deactivate the autopilot when he was requested to do so, and the second by the Central Control Center dispatcher, who did not order Train No. 5 to stop at any point, even when the driver of Train No. 4 had warned he would stop due to the obstruction.

Train No. 5 was a 40-year-old model that had been refurbished recently. It was removed from circulation in 2011 after it had multiple braking problems. By 2014, it operated for four hours on Line 7 before being returned to the workshops. As Line 5 is one of the least used lines in the system, the train ran on that line instead.

After the crash, the station was temporarily closed for repairs; a worker was killed when he fell to the tracks after a railcar in which he was standing uncoupled during cleanup operations.

To keep the tracks from getting wet, a 1 km (0.62 mi) tunnel was planned, but due to a lack of budget that project was canceled. Instead, an 800 m (0.50 mi) roof that cost 65 million pesos was built to prevent the tracks from getting wet and to prevent trains from sliding.

==== Other ====
Two unrelated fake bomb threat hoaxes have occurred at Oceanía station. The first was in 1994 and was attributed to the Zapatista Army of National Liberation; the second was not attributed to any group and happened on 7 May 2015. After the collapse of the elevated railway near Olivos metro station on Line 12 in May 2021, users reported the structural damage to other elevated stations, including Oceanía station. The then-head of government of Mexico City, Claudia Sheinbaum, said that the reports would be examined accordingly.

On 6 June 2023, the station master died on the Line B tracks while performing track-switching work. While he was walking from one track to another, he stepped on a walkway that broke. When he fell, he hit his head on a track, possibly the third rail. It was not disclosed whether he died from electrocution or from the impact. System personnel reported the damaged condition of the walkway since 2022.

After a homeless person allegedly started a fire by burning trash under the bridge connecting Oceanía and Deportivo Oceanía, service bound to Ciudad Azteca was canceled on 4 November 2026. The fire damaged electrical equipment.

== Ridership ==
Daily ridership for Line 5 in 2024

Daily ridership for Line B in 2024

According to official data, Line B records higher entries than Line 5. Prior to the impact of the COVID-19 pandemic, Oceanía metro station recorded a total ridership of 6,918,126 passengers in 2019, averaging 18,953 daily entries.

The station's total ridership for 2025 was 5,417,560 passengers, with a daily average of 14,842 entries. By line, Line 5 recorded 2,666,169 passengers, averaging 7,304 per day. Line B recorded 2,751,391 passengers, averaging 7,538. In the same year, when considered individually among the system's 195 stations, the Line 5 station ranked 159th busiest, while the Line B station ranked 156th.

Annual passenger ridership (Line 5)
Year	Ridership	Average daily	Rank	% change	Ref.
2025	2,666,169	7,304	159/195	−7.93%	
2024	2,895,727	7,911	146/195	−4.49%	
2023	3,031,730	8,306	133/195	+18.31%	
2022	2,562,528	7,020	137/195	+27.99%	
2021	2,002,185	5,485	139/195	−21.16%	
2020	2,539,621	6,938	136/195	−18.85%	
2019	3,129,656	8,574	161/195	+1.77%	
2018	3,075,329	8,425	162/195	+1.30%	
2017	3,035,718	8,317	161/195	−3.43%	
2016	3,143,547	8,588	160/195	−0.27%	

Annual passenger ridership (Line B)
Year	Ridership	Average daily	Rank	% change	Ref.
2025	2,751,391	7,538	156/195	−8.71%	
2024	3,013,790	8,234	142/195	−5.64%	
2023	3,193,934	8,750	129/195	+9.82%	
2022	2,908,426	7,968	134/195	+37.87%	
2021	2,109,569	5,779	137/195	−14.15%	
2020	2,457,375	6,714	138/195	−35.14%	
2019	3,788,470	10,379	153/195	+4.89%	
2018	3,612,009	9,895	155/195	+0.86%	
2017	3,581,354	9,811	154/195	−6.92%	
2016	3,847,734	10,512	145/195	−2.74%	
