= Deportivo Oceanía metro station =

Mexico City metro station

Deportivo Oceanía
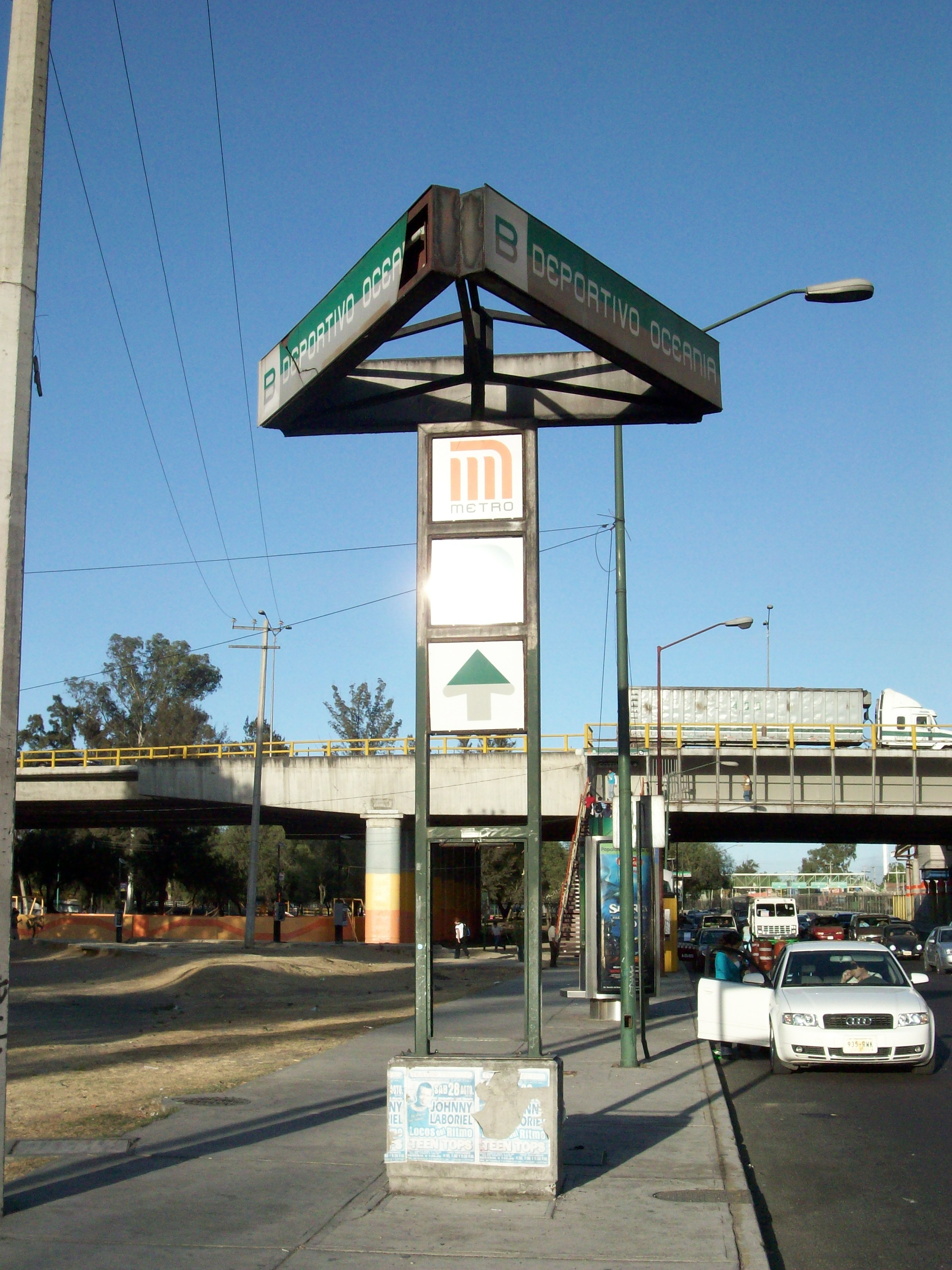

General information
- Location: Mexico City; Mexico
- Coordinates: 19°27′04″N 99°04′45″W
- System: Mexico City Metro
- Platforms: 1 island platform
- Tracks: 2

Construction
- Structure type: At grade

History
- Opened: 15 December 1999

Passengers
- 2025: 4,380,121 (Note: The data here is limited to the most recent ten years to avoid excessive listings; earlier figures can be found in this page's history or on the Mexico City Metro website. To calculate the average daily ridership, the annual total is divided by 365 days (366 in leap years), with decimals omitted from the result. Each station per line is ranked individually, as the system counts transfer stations separately. The percentage change is calculated automatically using the data from the current year and the previous year.) ▼5.08%
- Rank: 120/195

Services
Preceding station	Mexico City Metro	Following station
Bosque de Aragón toward Ciudad Azteca	Line B	Oceanía toward Buenavista
Route map
Location
- Location within Mexico City
- Area map

Deportivo Oceanía is an at-grade metro station in Gustavo A. Madero borough, in México City Mexico. Its represented by a koala clinging to a soccer ball. This metro station is named after nearby Deportivo Oceanía sports center, located north of the city; it offers many sports activities, like Tae Kwon Do, Volleyball, Soccer, with low fares, from $26.00 México Peso to $40. Deportivo Oceanía has facilities for the handicapped, and it is located near Avenida 608 avenue.

The station was opened on 15 December 1999.

From 23 April to 28 June 2020, the station was temporarily closed due to the COVID-19 pandemic in Mexico.

== Ridership ==
Annual passenger ridership
Year	Ridership	Average daily	Rank	% change	Ref.
2025	4,380,121	12,000	120/195	−5.08%
2024	4,614,355	12,607	107/195	−9.18%
2023	5,080,575	13,919	91/195	+9.58%
2022	4,636,198	12,701	92/195	+59.66%
2021	2,903,706	7,955	114/195	+27.64%
2020	2,274,937	7,265	133/195	−60.31%
2019	5,731,450	15,702	115/195	+2.53%
2018	5,589,942	15,314	120/195	+1.51%
2017	5,506,834	15,087	117/195	−7.71%
2016	5,966,690	16,302	111/195	−3.61%
