= Pantitlán metro station =

Mexico City Metro station

Pantitlán
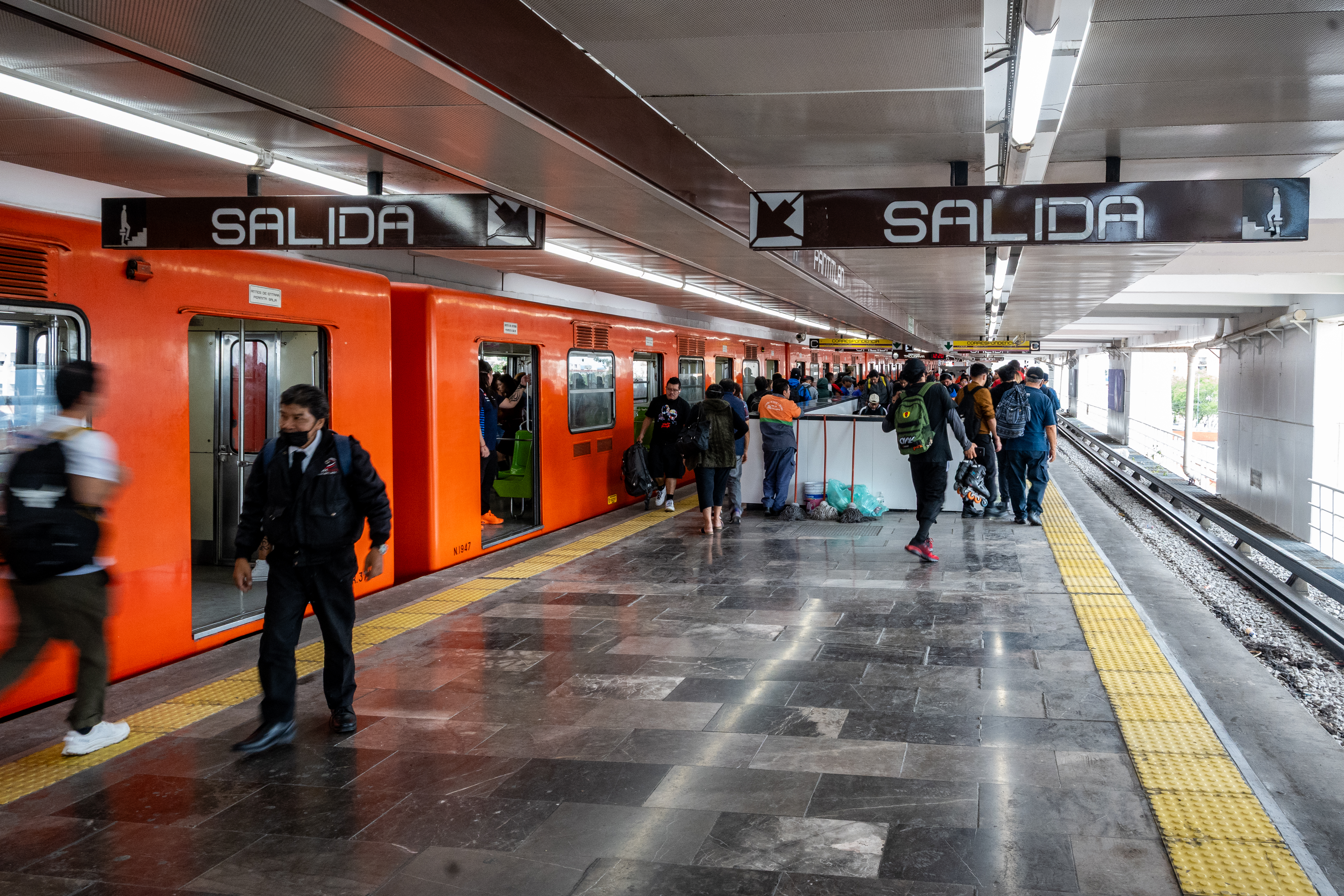
- Line 9 platforms, 2025

General information
- Location: Miguel Lebrija Avenue and Río Churubusco Avenue; Iztacalco and Venustiano Carranza, Mexico City; Mexico
- Coordinates: 19°24′55″N 99°04′20″W
- System: Mexico City Metro
- Owner: Government of Mexico City
- Operator: Sistema de Transporte Colectivo (STC)
- Platforms: 2 island platforms; 2 island platforms; 2 island platforms; 2 side platforms
- Tracks: 11
- Connections: Pantitlán; Pantitlán; Pantitlán; Route 168; Trolleybus Line 2: Pantitlán; Routes: 11-B, 11-C, 19-F, 19-G; Various local and intercity service routes

Construction
- Structure type: Underground; At grade; Elevated; Underground
- Depth: 12 m (39 ft)
- Cycle facilities: Bicycle parking-only
- Accessible: Yes

Other information
- Status: In service

History
- Opened: 22 August 1984; 42 years ago; 19 December 1981; 44 years ago; 26 August 1987; 39 years ago; 12 August 1991; 35 years ago

Key dates
- 11 July 2022; 4 years ago: Temporarily closed
- 29 October 2023; 3 years ago: Reopened
- 17 December 2023; 2 years ago: Temporarily closed
- 10 September 2024; 2 years ago: Reopened

Passengers
- 2025: 55,089,833 (Note: The Mexico City Metro system records entries at interchange stations separately. Individually, Line 1 saw 11,368,824 passengers, Line 5 had 16,510,012 passengers, Line 9 recorded 16,260,300 passengers, and Line A had 10,950,697 passengers.) (Note: The system's website counts only passenger entries into stations and does not include passengers passing through, transferring between lines, or exiting the station. The data here is limited to the most recent ten years to avoid excessive listings; earlier figures can be found in this page's history or on the Mexico City Metro website. To calculate the average daily ridership, the annual total is divided by 365 days (366 in leap years), with decimals omitted from the result. Each station per line is ranked individually, as the system counts transfer stations separately. The percentage change is calculated automatically using the data from the current year and the previous year.) ▲32.6%
- Rank: 19/195; 8/195; 9/195; 23/195

Services
Preceding station	Mexico City Metro	Following station
Zaragoza toward Observatorio	Line 1	Terminus
Hangares toward Politécnico	Line 5	Terminus
Puebla toward Tacubaya	Line 9	Terminus
Terminus	Line A	Agrícola Oriental toward La Paz
Route map
Location
- Location within Mexico City
- Area map and exits

Pantitlán metro station (Note: Estación del Metro Pantitlán. Spanish pronunciation: [pantiˈtlan]. The etymology comes from the Nahuatl language, "Between flags".) is a Mexico City Metro transfer station in the boroughs of Iztacalco and Venustiano Carranza, in Mexico City. The station features a combination of underground, at-grade, and elevated buildings. It has six island platforms and two side platforms, serving Lines 1 (Pink Line), 5 (Yellow Line), 9 (Brown Line), and A (Purple Line). Pantitlán metro station is the only four-line interchange station in the system. It serves as the terminal station for all lines and is followed by Zaragoza (Line 1), Hangares (Line 5), Puebla (Line 9), and Agrícola Oriental (Line A) metro stations.

Pantitlán metro station opened on 19 December 1981 providing service northwest toward Consulado on Line 5; westward service toward Observatorio on Line 1 began on 22 August 1984; service west toward Centro Médico on Line 9 started on 26 August 1987; and southeastward service toward La Paz on Line A commenced on 12 August 1991. The station serves the colonias (neighborhoods) of Ampliación Adolfo López Mateos, Aviación Civil, and Pantitlán, and is named after the last one, along Avenida Miguel Lebrija and Avenida Río Churubusco. The station's pictogram features the silhouettes of two flagpoles with blank flags, reflecting the meaning of "Pantitlán", which in Nahuatl means "between flags".

The station facilities offer partial accessibility for people with disabilities as there are elevators, wheelchair ramps, tactile paving, and braille signage plates. Inside, there are a cultural display, an Internet café, a women's defense module, a health module, and a mural. Outside, the station includes a transportation hub servicing local bus routes, there is a public ministry office, and a bicycle parking station. Pantitlán is the busiest station in the system. In 2019, before the impact of the COVID-19 pandemic on public transport, the station recorded a ridership of 132,845,471 passenger entries. In comparison, Cuatro Caminos, which ranked second, had 39,378,128 passenger entries. As of 2025, Pantitlán recorded a ridership of 55,089,833 passenger entries following multiple reconstruction works carried out in previous years.

The station area has experienced subsidence since at least the 1990s, primarily due to the extraction of groundwater to meet the demands of the large population in eastern Mexico City and the metropolitan area. From July 2022 to October 2023, the Line 1 station was closed for upgrades to the tunnel and technical equipment. Between December 2023 and September 2024, the Line 9 station was closed for re-leveling of the elevated viaduct due to continued subsidence.

== Location and layout ==
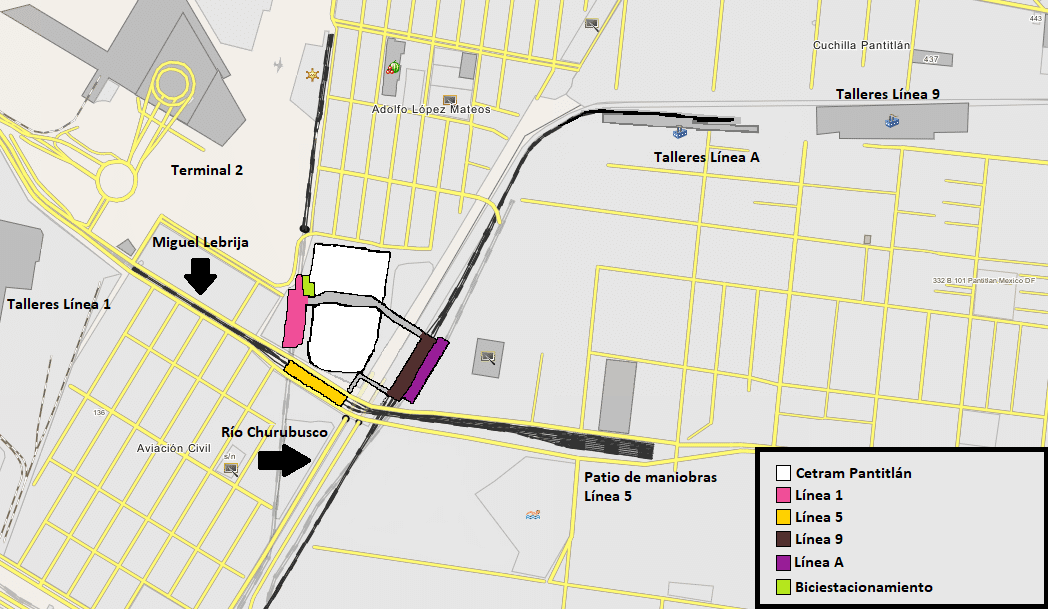
Station layout

Line 1; Line 5	Line 9; Line A	CETRAM; Bicycle parking station

Pantitlán is a metro transfer station situated at the intersection of Avenida Miguel Lebrija and Avenida Río Churubusco, spanning the boroughs of Iztacalco and Venustiano Carranza, in eastern Mexico City. The station serves three colonias (neighborhoods): Ampliación Adolfo López Mateos, Aviación Civil, and Pantitlán.

Pantitlán metro station serves as the terminal station for Lines 1, 5, 9, and A. It is followed by Zaragoza on Line 1, Hangares on Line 5, Puebla on Line 9, and Agrícola Oriental on Line A. Pantitlán metro station provides accessible services for people with disabilities with elevators on Lines 1 and A, wheelchair ramps and escalators on Line 9, and tactile paving and braille signage plates on Lines 1, 9 and A.

Pantitlán metro station has multiple exits serving its various lines. The exit for Line 1 is located to the west and provides access to Avenida Miguel Lebrija and Calle Alberto Braniff in Colonia Aviación Civil, Venustiano Carranza. For Line 5, there are two exits: the northern exit is situated along Calle Alberto Braniff in Colonia Aviación Civil, while the southern exit is on Avenida Miguel Lebrija, also in Colonia Aviación Civil.

Line 9 has two exits as well. The western exit can be found along Avenida Río Churubusco in Colonia Ampliación Adolfo López Mateos, Venustiano Carranza. The eastern exit is located at the corner of Avenida Miguel Lebrija and Calle 2ª Cerrada de Río Churubusco in Colonia Pantitlán, Iztacalco.

Lastly, Line A has three exits. The northern exit is at the intersection of Avenida Río Churubusco and Calle Talleres Gráficos in Colonia Ampliación Adolfo López Mateos, Venustiano Carranza. The northwestern exit is at Avenida Río Churubusco and Calle Guadalupe Victoria, within the same neighborhood. The southern exit is also along Avenida Río Churubusco, but in Colonia Pantitlán, Iztacalco.

The area is serviced by a Centro de transferencia modal (CETRAM), which functions as a transportation hub connecting various modes of transportation. It supports the Metrobús (Line 4), Mexibús (Line III) and trolleybus (Line 2) systems. Additionally, the hub is served by Routes 11-B, 11-C, 19-F, and 19-G of the city's public bus system (locally known as peseros), and by Route 168 of the Red de Transporte de Pasajeros bus network. Pantitlán is also the nearest metro station to Terminal 2 of the Mexico City International Airport, situated around 500 meters (1,600 ft) away.

Over 3,600 transport units operated at the hub as of 2010. By 2016, it was estimated to be the most heavily used CETRAM in the country. As of 2022, the transportation hub handled an estimated 1,500,000 daily passengers.

== History and construction ==
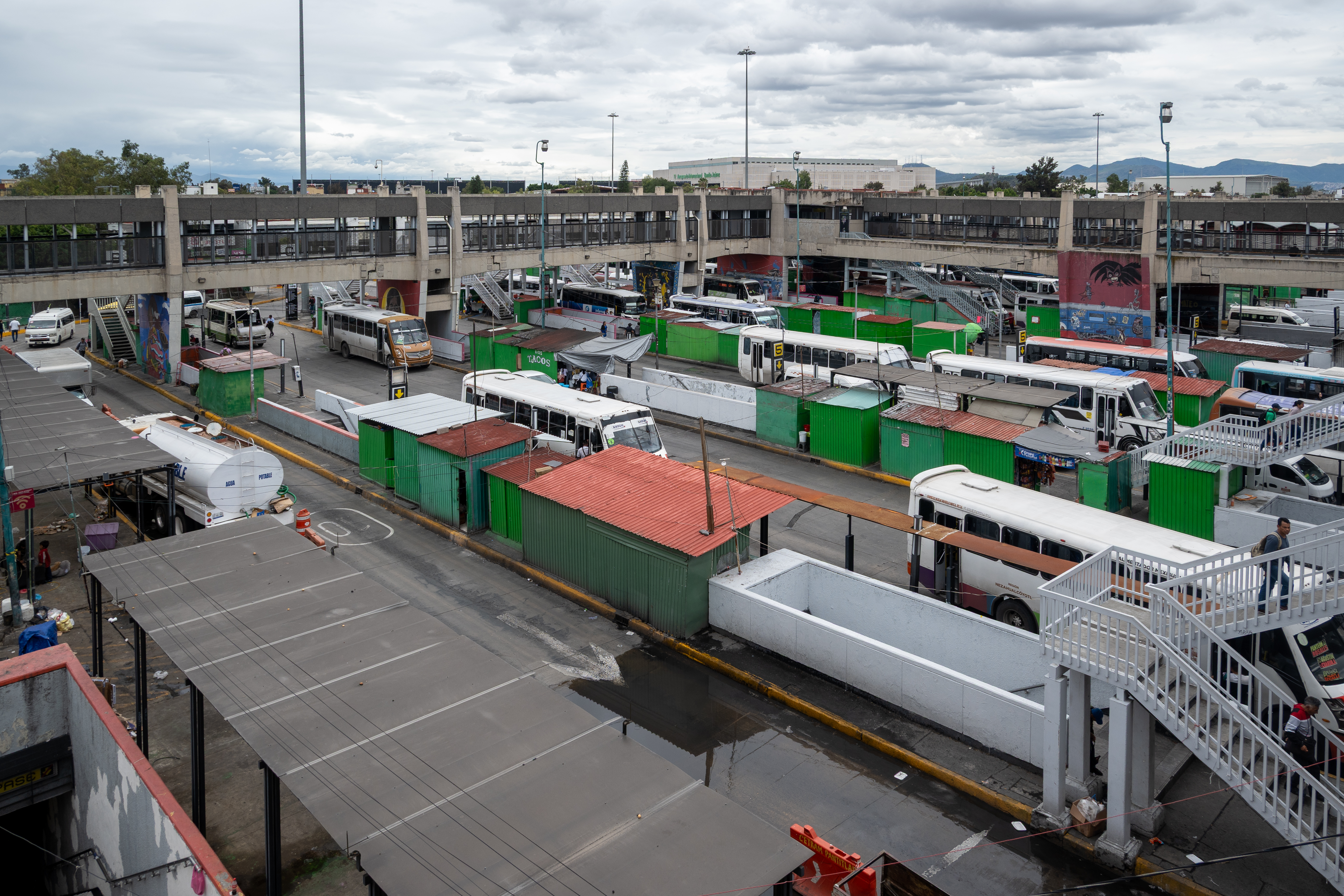
CETRAM Pantitlán in 2025

The architects of Pantitlán metro station were Aurelio Nuño Morales and Isaac Broid. Originally, Line 8, which runs from the historic center of Mexico City to Constitución de 1917 in Iztapalapa, was originally planned to operate from Pantitlán to Indios Verdes, in Gustavo A. Madero, northern Mexico City. However, the project was canceled due to potential structural issues near the Zócalo area, where it was intended to interchange with Line 2 at Zócalo metro station.

=== Name and pictogram ===
Pantitlán metro station was named after Colonia Pantitlán, whose name means "between flags" in Nahuatl. During the Aztec era, the area (formerly part of Lake Texcoco) was marked with flagpoles to warn canoeists of dangerous currents. The station's pictogram features the silhouette of two flagpoles with blank flags.

=== Line 1 ===
The line was built by Ingeniería de Sistemas de Transportes Metropolitano, Electrometro, and Cometro, the latter a subsidiary of Empresas ICA. Its first section was inaugurated on 4 September 1969, operating from Zaragoza towards Chapultepec station. It opened to the general public the following day. An eastward extension toward Pantitlán opened on 22 August 1984, operating westward towards Observatorio metro station and connecting Lines 1 and 5. Before Pantitlán was opened, Zaragoza served as the terminus of Line 1, and the workshops are located between the two stations. This configuration indirectly benefited operations by allowing trains to depart every 90 seconds to either station.

Pantitlán is an underground metro station with an interstation tunnel to Zaragoza measuring 1,320 meters (4,330 ft). The passenger transfer tunnel connecting Line 1 with Line A is approximately 600 meters (2,000 ft) long, making it the third longest in the system, after those at Atlalilco and La Raza stations.

In 2016, the station underwent renovation work. The station was closed on 11 July 2022 for modernization of the line's tunnel and technical equipment. After fifteen months of renovations, authorities reopened Pantitlán station on 29 October 2023. Excélsior reported in July 2024 that all the modernized stations had leaks of varying dimensions, despite authorities having stated that they would be sealed during the repairs.

=== Line 5 ===
Cometro built the line, and its first section opened on 19 December 1981, with operations extending toward Consulado station. Pantitlán is an at-grade metro station whose segment between it and Hangares station transitions from street level to underground. This section measures 1,644 meters (5,394 ft). Remains of mammoths, fish, and birds were discovered during its construction.

=== Line 9 ===
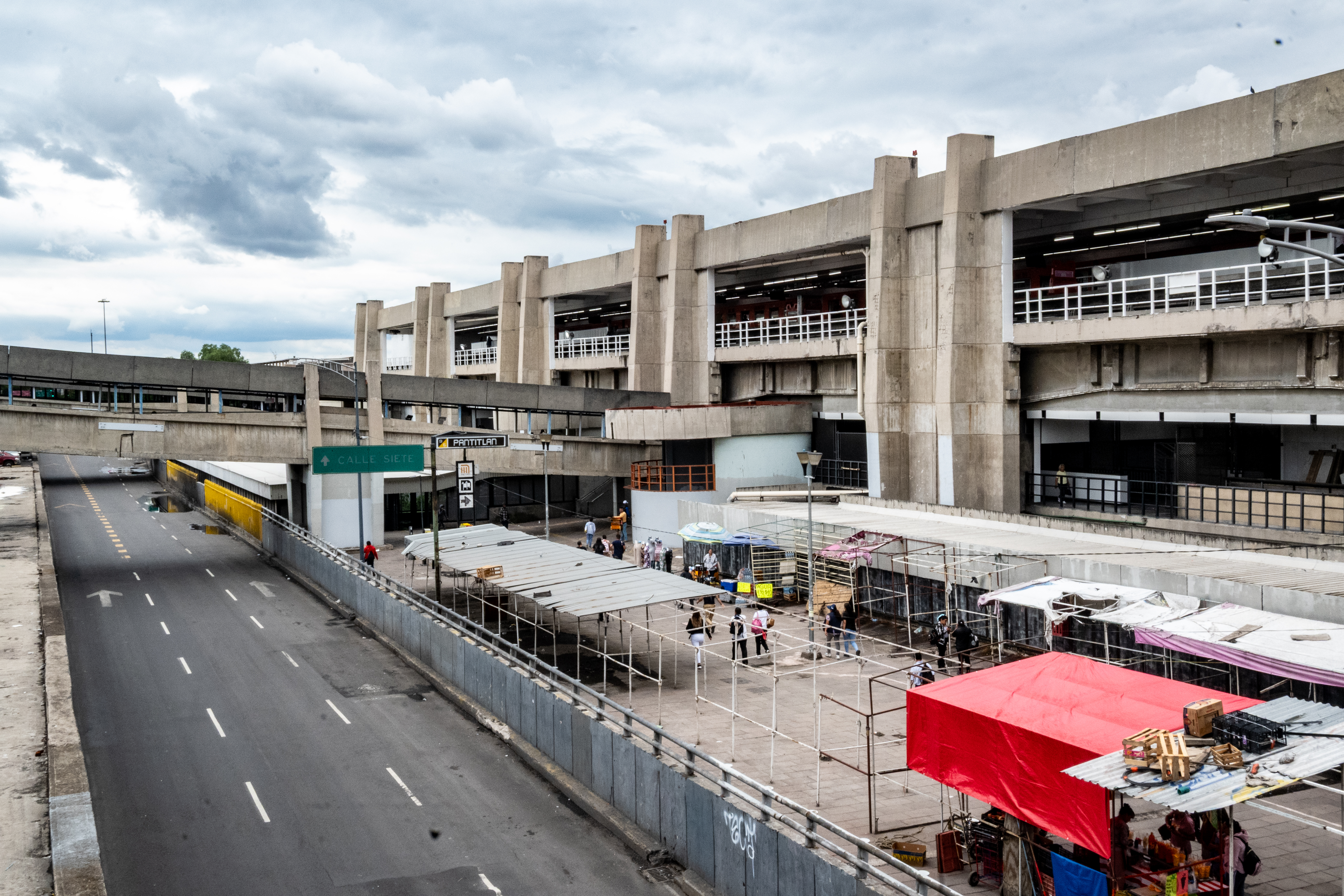
Line 9 is located alongside Río Churubusco Avenue.

Cometro built the line, and its first section opened on 26 August 1987, with service toward Centro Médico station. Pantitlán is an elevated metro station with a 1,380-meter (4,530 ft) long viaduct connecting it to Puebla station. Additionally, a train shed is found after the station. During the station's construction, a mammoth tusk and molar were discovered at a depth of 13.5 meters (44 ft).

=== Line A ===
Empresas ICA built the line, which opened on 12 August 1991, operating towards La Paz station, in the municipality of the same name in the State of Mexico. It is the line's only underground station as the trains pass beneath the Line 5 tracks. To construct the station, ICA used the Milan method to build a rectangular false tunnel. Floor slabs were added, and the ceiling consists of prefabricated slabs. Pavement was installed above the ceiling as required.

Pantitlán is a light metro station, with the first segment toward Agrícola Oriental station measuring 1,409 meters (4,623 ft) in length. As the line follows Calzada Ignacio Zaragoza Avenue, it transitions to street level.

From its opening until 12 December 2013, passengers transferring from Line A to other lines were required to pay separate fares.

=== Landmarks ===
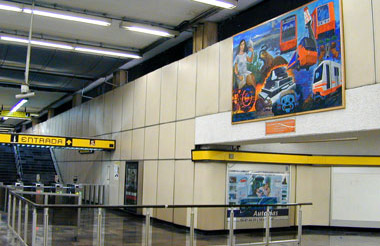
Alegoría a la Ciudad de México y el Sistema de Transporte Colectivo at Line 5's lobby

Inside the station are a cultural display, an Internet café, a women's defense module, and a health module. Outside the station, a public ministry office was established in 2002 to reduce criminal offenses in and around the station.

On 1 May 2007, the system unveiled the mural Alegoría a la Ciudad de México y el Sistema de Transporte Colectivo (lit. transl. Allegory to Mexico City and the Collective Transport System), painted by José Luis Elías Jáuregui. According to him, the work was inspired by Mexican history and depicts elements that symbolize it, including the Popocatépetl and Iztaccíhuatl volcanoes, an eagle devouring a snake (a reference to the national coat of arms), a pyramid, and a Mestiza woman holding a white dove. The acrylic-on-canvas artwork, which measures 9 m (30 ft) wide, honors metro workers by featuring four train models used by the system. In 2014, the Government of Mexico City built a bicycle parking station adjacent to the CETRAM.

== Incidents ==
=== Sinking issues ===
Sinking reports have existed since at least 1998. The area is affected by the extraction of groundwater in the city, causing the station to sink approximately 11 centimeters (4.3 in) per year. Subsidence on Line 9 increases as a result of differential vibrations from train movements, as their varying speeds affect different areas of the bridge and its columns.

By 2016, the system reported cracks and subsidence that were expected to take about five years to resolve. Following the collapse of the elevated railway near Olivos metro station on Line 12 in May 2021, users reported structural damage at other elevated stations, including Pantitlán metro station. Claudia Sheinbaum, the then head of government of Mexico City, said that these reports would be examined appropriately. According to a Latinus investigation, Sheinbaum's government commissioned Constructores ICI in September 2022 to study and identify solutions for the structural problems of the rail bridge, particularly the section between Pantitlán and Puebla stations. The firm recommended 539 actions, the most significant of which were:

- Demolish and rebuild the 150-meter (490 ft) elevated track section between Pantitlán and Puebla stations.
- Re-level and refurbish a 160-meter (520 ft) section of the bridge along Río Churubusco Avenue.
- Carry out maintenance and replacement of the line's overpass equipment.
- Reinforce buildings and structures at Pantitlán and Puebla stations.
- Replace all electrical materials, 520 ties, 60 rails, and 2,000 cubic meters (71,000 cu ft) of ballast along the 5-kilometer (3.1 mi) elevated viaduct.
- Renew the line's centralized control, automatic train operation, signaling, and communications systems.

Journalists from Latinus said that as of August 2023 none of the recommended actions had been performed based on information provided by the city's Secretariat of Public Works.

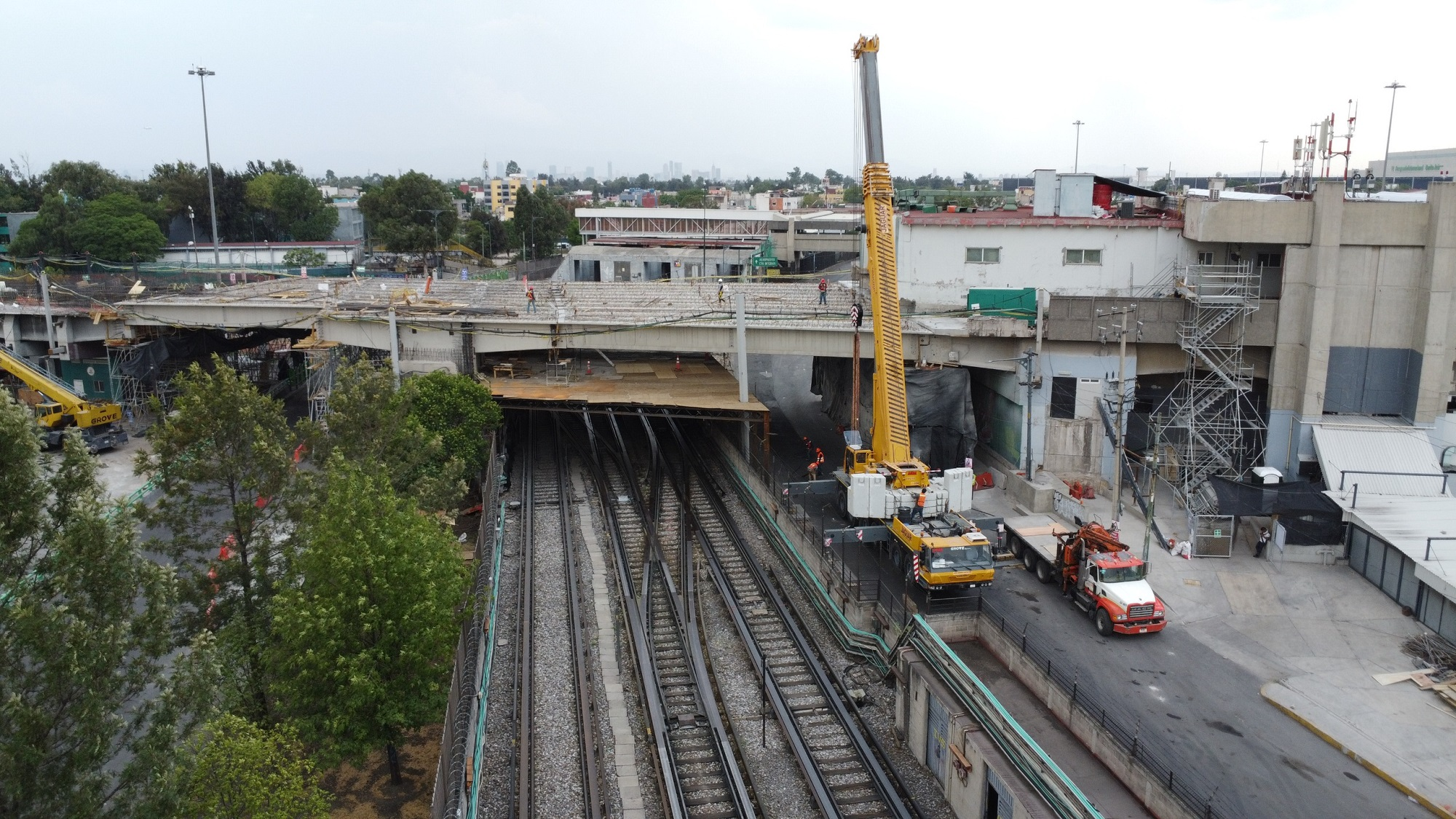
The bridge under reconstruction in 2024

In February 2023, authorities reinforced Line 9's overpass near Pantitlán station with metallic supports. After strengthening the bridge, the city government assured that the elevated section was safe. This reinforcement was in line with recommendations from the Institute for Building Safety, which in April 2022 advised shoring up Gerber beams with support beams. However, the metro union did not support the decision, arguing that it did not provide an "integral solution" and that, combined with the deterioration of technical equipment on the bridge—such as ballast and sleepers—it posed a risk of derailment.

Because the bridge shoring did not resolve the issues and the sinking persisted, metro authorities announced in September 2023 that three Line 9 stations—Pantitlán, Puebla, and Ciudad Deportiva—would be closed. The repairs were expected to be completed between December 2023 and May 2024, but the section reopened on 10 September 2024. The project included the replacement of 31 misaligned beams, the installation of new track infrastructure (including rails, ballast, sleepers, and fastenings), and the replacement of three railroad switches.

=== Other ===
From 1 to 16 March 2020, Pantitlán, Hangares and Terminal Aérea stations on Line 5 were closed due to a gasoline leak at a nearby gas station. The Line 9 station was closed from 27 March to 7 April 2021 due to repairs on the section between Velódromo and Ciudad Deportiva station. Platforms M, N, O, P, Q, R, S, and T at the CETRAM were closed on 11 October 2021 after structural failures were detected in the station's basement, where out-of-service trains are housed.

On 26 January 2022, a man threatened to jump from one of the station's interline bridges. A police officer rappeled down to rescue him, but the combined weight caused the rope to fail, and both fell approximately 8 meters (26 ft). The officer sustained severe head trauma, while the man was unharmed.

== Ridership ==
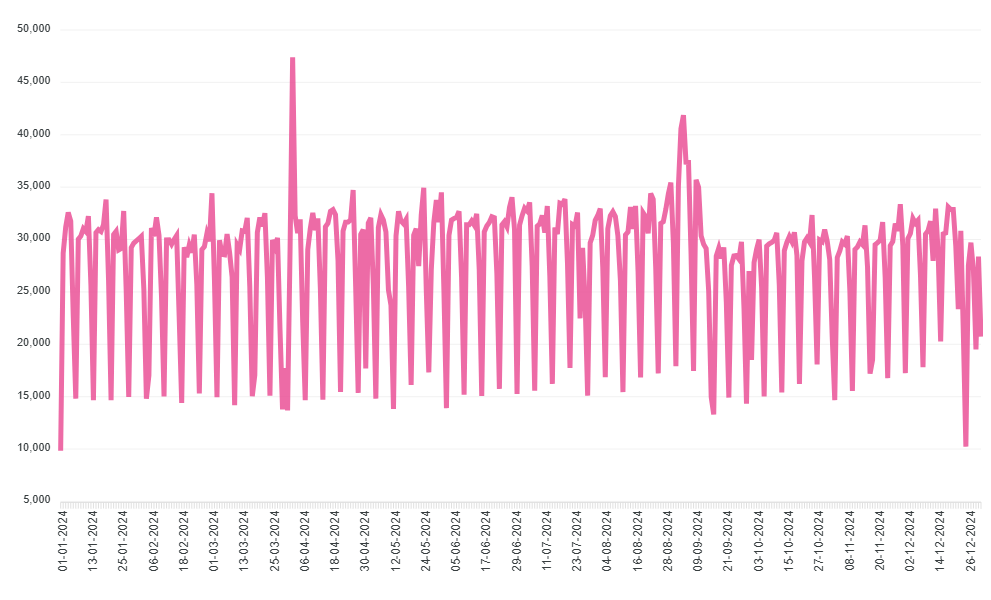
Daily ridership for Line 1 in 2024

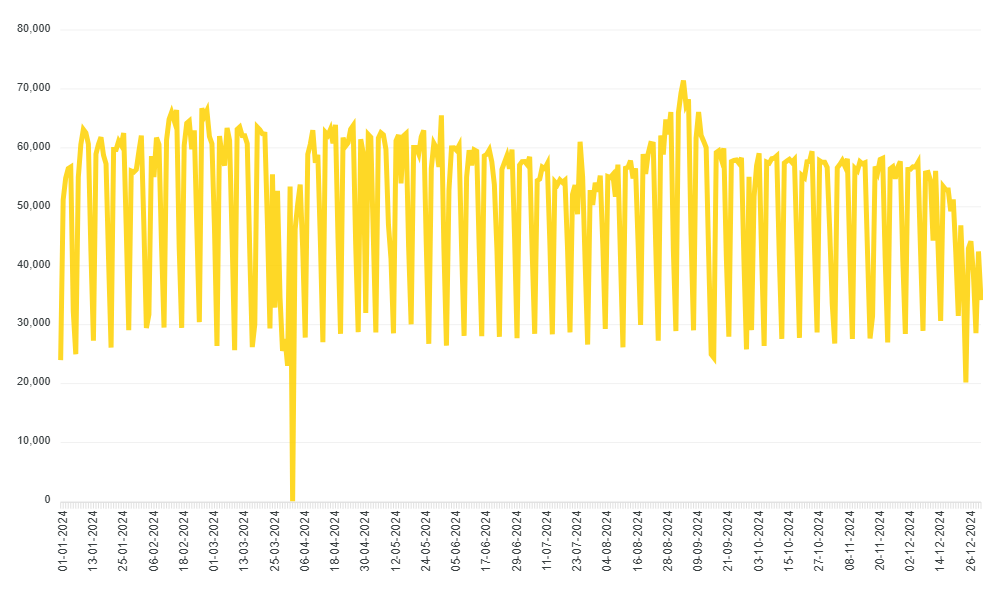
Daily ridership for Line 5 in 2024

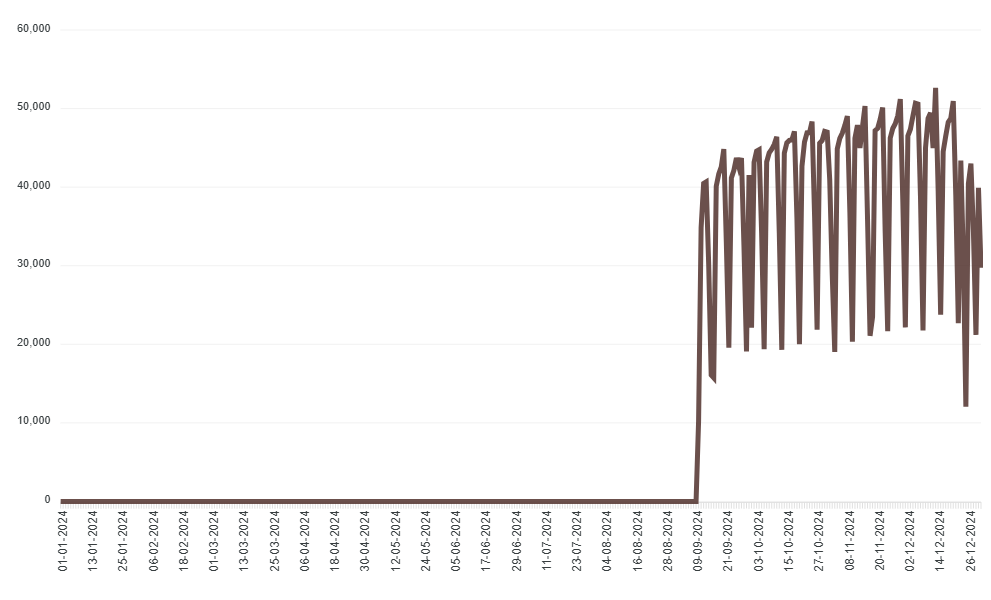
Daily ridership for Line 9 in 2024

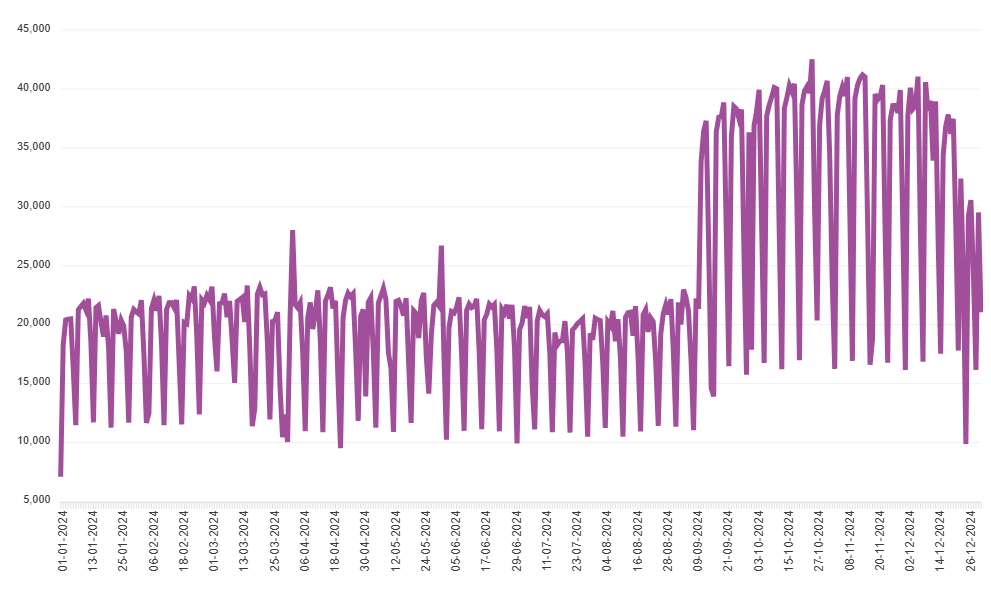
Daily ridership for Line A in 2024

Pantitlán is the busiest station on the Mexico City Metro. According to official data, all of Pantitlán's platforms rank among the busiest in the system's 195 stations when considered individually. In 2025, the station recorded a total ridership of 55,089,833 passengers; the second-busiest station that year was Cuatro Caminos, with 34,816,623 entries.

Prior to the impact of the COVID-19 pandemic and the reconstruction works carried out in the 2020s, the station recorded 132,845,471 passengers in 2019, averaging 363,960 daily. In comparison, Cuatro Caminos registered 39,378,128 passengers.

By line, Line 1 recorded 11,368,824 passengers in 2025, averaging 31,147 per day, an increase of 1,221,471 compared to 2024. Line 5 recorded 16,510,012 passengers, averaging 45,232 per day, a decrease of 1,988,741 from the previous year. Line 9 recorded 16,260,300 passengers, averaging 44,548 per day, an increase of 11,843,853 compared to 2024. Line A recorded 10,950,697 passengers, averaging 30,001 per day, an increase of 2,467,069 from the previous year.

In 2024, when considered individually among the system's 195 stations, the Line 1 station ranked 19th busiest, Line 5 ranked 8th, Line 9 ranked 9th, and Line A ranked 23rd.

As of 2010, approximately 789,000 commuters used the station daily. That year, an estimated 65 percent of users originated from the State of Mexico. By 2019, passenger flow reached nearly 100,000 people per hour between 6:00 and 10:00 a.m. During rush hours transfer areas tend to overcrow. To manage this volume and reduce accidents, system authorities announced measures to improve passenger distribution and planned the construction of a ring corridor to interconnect all platforms more efficiently.

Annual passenger ridership (Line 1)
Year	Ridership	Average daily	Rank	% change	Ref.
2025	11,368,824	31,147	19/195	+12.04%	
2024	10,147,353	27,725	27/195	+611.11%	
2023	1,426,971	3,909	172/195	−80.54%	
2022	7,332,887	20,090	42/195	−39.36%	
2021	12,091,630	33,127	10/195	−11.44%	
2020	13,653,217	37,303	8/195	−23.56%	
2019	17,860,457	48,932	17/195	+11.72%	
2018	15,986,200	43,797	20/195	+3.40%	
2017	15,461,001	42,358	19/195	−10.01%	
2016	17,181,357	46,943	18/195	−0.80%	

Annual passenger ridership (Line 5)
Year	Ridership	Average daily	Rank	% change	Ref.
2025	16,510,012	45,232	8/195	−10.75%	
2024	18,498,753	50,543	5/195	+6.10%	
2023	17,435,968	47,769	9/195	−20.02%	
2022	21,799,271	59,724	5/195	+2.15%	
2021	21,339,443	58,464	4/195	+3.74%	
2020	20,569,875	56,201	5/195	−43.79%	
2019	36,594,748	100,259	4/195	−1.92%	
2018	37,311,183	102,222	4/195	+5.69%	
2017	35,302,744	96,719	4/195	−1.57%	
2016	35,866,955	97,997	4/195	+2.60%	

Annual passenger ridership (Line 9)
Year	Ridership	Average daily	Rank	% change	Ref.
2025	16,260,300	44,548	9/195	+268.18%	
2024	4,416,447	12,066	112/195	−74.92%	
2023	17,612,238	48,252	8/195	−22.20%	
2022	22,638,988	62,024	4/195	+1.21%	
2021	22,367,944	61,282	3/195	+3.97%	
2020	21,514,054	58,781	4/195	−34.49%	
2019	32,839,328	89,970	5/195	+3.34%	
2018	31,778,736	87,065	6/195	+2.96%	
2017	30,864,327	84,559	5/195	−7.26%	
2016	33,279,237	90,926	5/195	−4.97%	

Annual passenger ridership (Line A)
Year	Ridership	Average daily	Rank	% change	Ref.
2025	10,950,697	30,001	23/195	+29.08%	
2024	8,483,628	23,179	40/195	−29.59%	
2023	12,048,117	33,008	16/195	−55.58%	
2022	27,125,243	74,315	3/195	−18.71%	
2021	33,368,107	91,419	1/195	+5.52%	
2020	31,623,280	86,402	1/195	−30.58%	
2019	45,550,938	124,797	1/195	+11.51%	
2018	40,850,325	111,918	1/195	−0.04%	
2017	40,865,184	111,959	1/195	−3.69%	
2016	42,431,334	115,932	2/195	+0.74%	
