= Cárcamo de Dolores =

Hydraulic structure in Mexico City, Mexico

Coordinates: 19.412738°N 99.198292°W

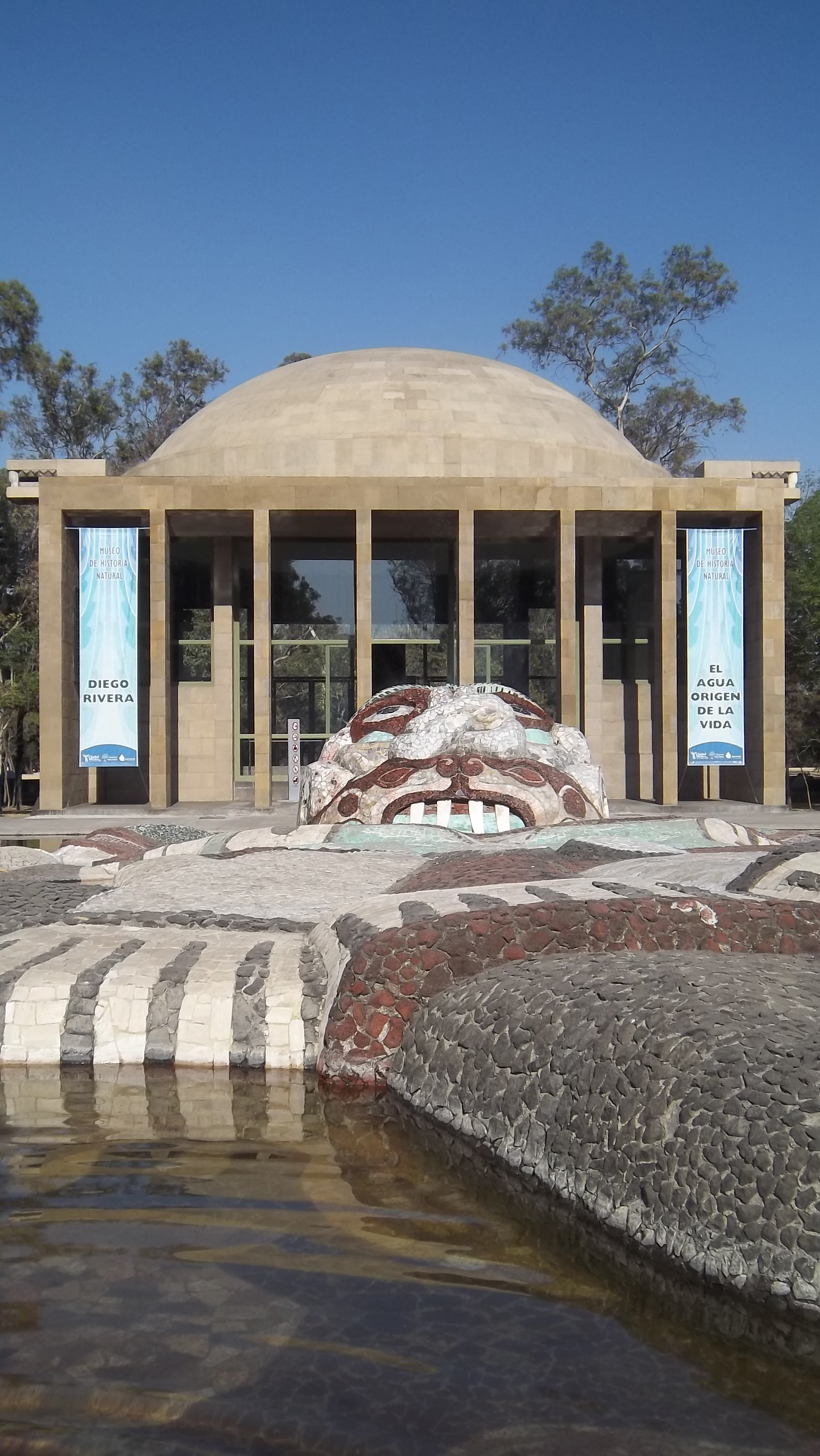
Tlaloc Fountain and Cárcamo de Dolores

The Cárcamo de Dolores (Sump of Dolores) is a hydraulic structure located on the Second Section of Chapultepec Park, in Mexico City, comprising the building designed by architect Ricardo Rivas, inside the originally underwater mural Agua, el origen de la vida ("Water, source of life") of Mexican muralist Diego Rivera, the art installation Cámara Lambdoma by Ariel Guzik, and in outside, the Tlaloc Fountain, also of Rivera.

The building was constructed in 1951 to commemorate the end of the works in 1943 of the Lerma System, which still supply water to Mexico City and still flows in the place, but diverted from own building. It is part of the Museo de Historia Natural y Cultura Ambiental (Museum of Natural History and Environmental Culture).

== See also ==
- Mexican muralism
- Diego Rivera
