= Pesero =

Form of public transport in Mexico City

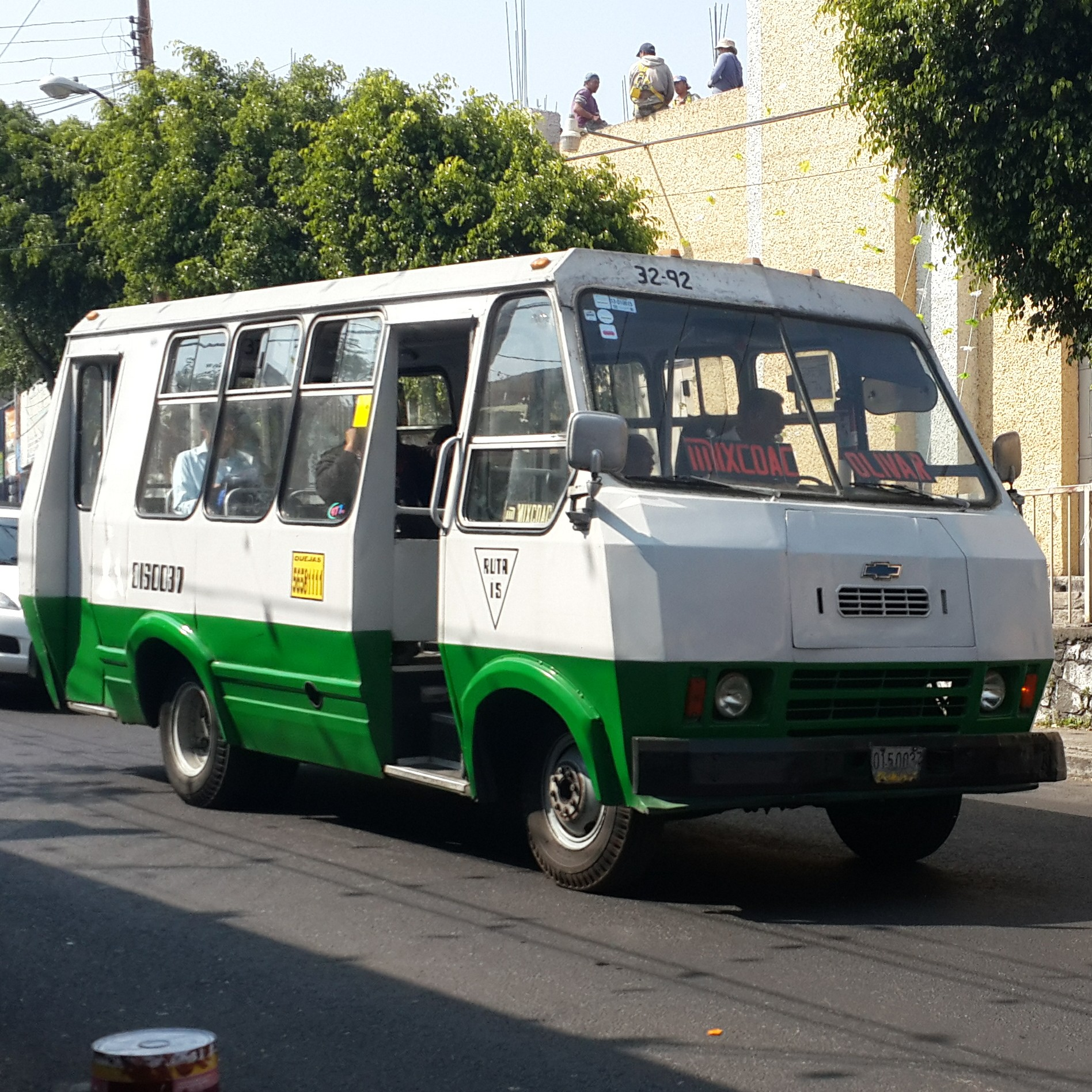
A pesero or microbús

A pesero, combi, van, micro or microbús is a form of public transport, most commonly seen in Mexico City. Its name derives from the fact that in the beginning of this form of transport a flat fee of one peso was charged per ride (hence the name "pesero" which could be interpreted as "peso collector").

== History ==
Minivans, colloquially named "Combis" after the Volkswagen Type 2 minibus, serve as peseros

First seen in the 1970s as the so-called taxi colectivo (share taxi or collective cab), peseros were originally big cars with fixed routes which would pick passengers at any point through their route, and drop them off also at any point. Passenger capacities were limited to those of a large car (usually up to six people plus a driver).

Being both cheaper than a proper taxi and able to cover routes not feasible for larger buses or other forms of public transport, by the 1980s, pesero owners started using Volkswagen Microbus vehicles (known in Mexico as combis from its Kombinationskraftwagen variant) for increased capacity of up to 12 passengers. The inability of the government-run public transport to serve the public's needs in a high-growth environment caused high demand and made them a very good business. Pesero owners kept up with demand by adding more units and routes, particularly in newly developing parts of the city such as Nezahualcóyotl, and they did so without any centralized planning. By the mid-to-late 1980s, most peseros were converted to gasoline-powered, half-length passenger buses (known as microbús or simply el micro in Mexico, but they are not similar to the VW Microbus vehicles mentioned before). They were capable of carrying around 22 sitting people or up to 50 if standing people are counted

As of 2007 a fleet of approximately 28,000 peseros carry an important part of Mexico City's public transport passengers, surpassing by far the capacity of the Mexico City Metro, STE trolleybuses, buses and taxis; peseros, (including VW Microbus, micros proper and full-length diesel buses) carry up to 60% of the city's passengers. However, despite the success of the decentralized system in carrying large numbers of passengers for low cost, the government is seeking ways to regulate microbus operation, ostensibly to address problems such as a lack of operator training and documented unit maintenance. Proposed changes include reducing the number of units or replacing them with full-size diesel-powered buses which carry more passengers per unit, and can utilize transfers and/or a unified farecard system, such as the Optibús system that has been implemented in León, Guanajuato. Other proposed alternatives include expanding the Metro and STE trolleybus network and different forms of transportation, such as the Metrobús, which has completely replaced pesero travel along Avenida de los Insurgentes avenue, and the Tren Suburbano, which will serve areas north of the city. Unlike most other North American and European cities of similar size, it is not possible to buy a pass or farecard in Mexico City that is valid on all types of transport within the city, rather, each form of transport one boards requires an additional (but low, the Metro fare is only MXN 5 pesos) fare.

== Organization ==
Logo adopted in 2020 by the government of Mexico City

Pesero drivers do not receive a fixed salary but are required to meet a daily quota prescribed by the owner of the vehicle. The driver is then allowed to keep the rest of the fares of the day. This fosters fierce competition among drivers, as every passenger is seen as valuable merchandise towards meeting the quota and thus increasing the driver's personal profit. As a result, peseros might race.

Peseros travel fixed routes, being able to pick up or drop off passengers anywhere through the route. The fees are according to distance traveled. Routes may begin and end anywhere, though often it is near metro stations.

Individual peseros have a sign affixed to the windshield indicating major points covered by the route such as metro stations (denoted by the Metro logo), hospitals, schools, avenues, etc.

== See also ==
- Dollar van
- Dolmuş
- Jeepney
- Jitney
- Marshrutka
- Mexico City Metro
- Mexico City Metrobús
- Nanny van
- Public light bus Hong Kong
- Share taxi – around the world
- Songthaew
- Red de Transporte de Pasajeros
- Tren Suburbano
