= Circuito Interior =

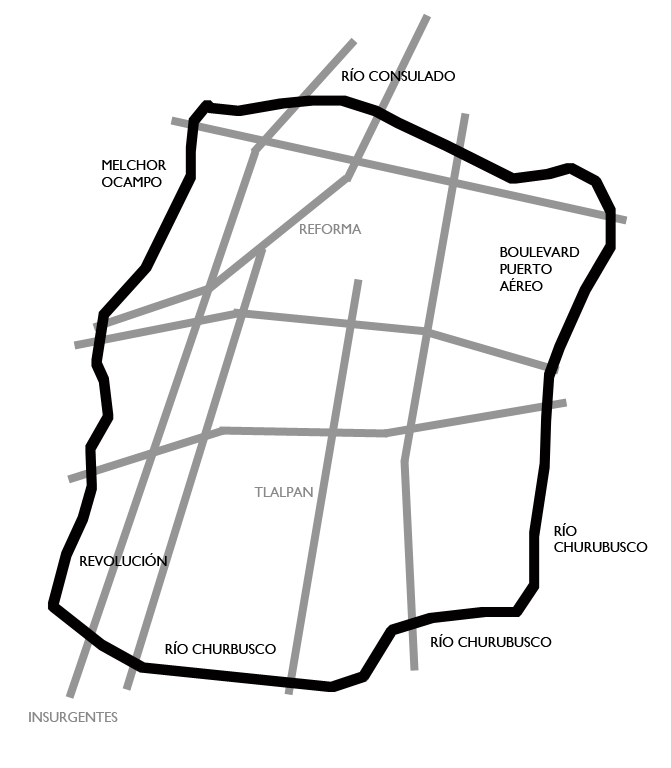
Map of the Circuito Interior's route around the central city

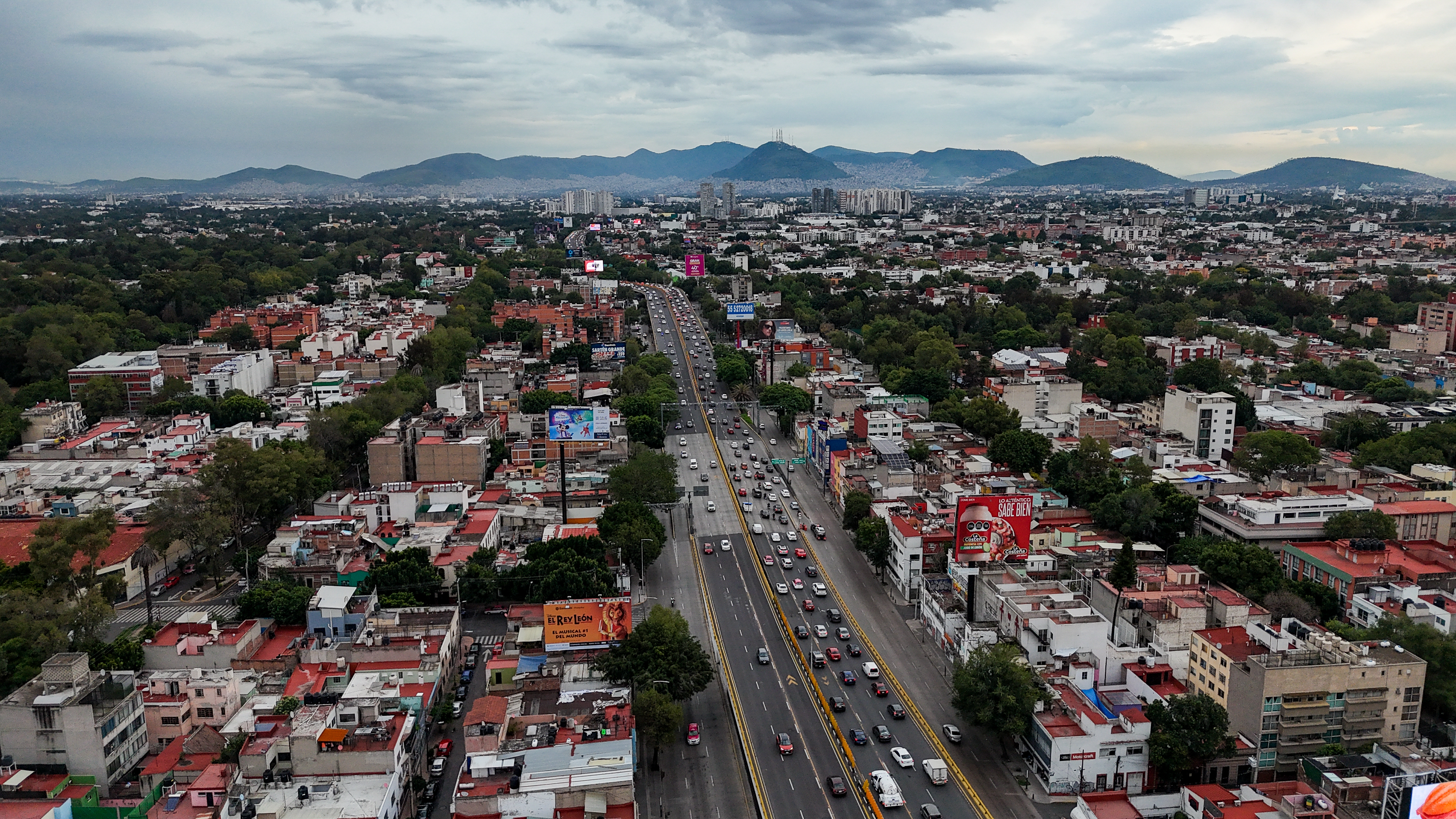
Circuito at Ribera de San Cosme

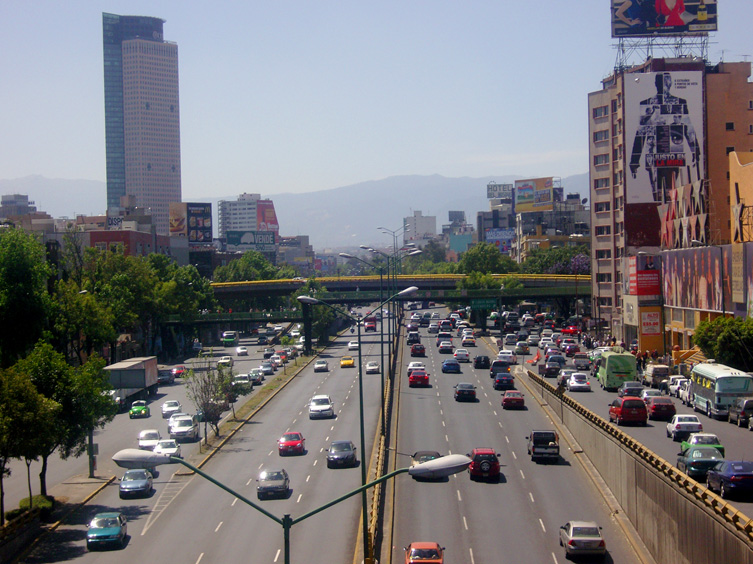
Circuito Interior.

The Circuito Interior Bicentenario ("Bicentennial Inner Loop") or more commonly, Circuito Interior or even more simply Circuito, is a 42-kilometre-long (26 mi) urban freeway (in parts) and at-grade boulevard (in others), forming a loop around the central neighborhoods of Mexico City. It was built starting in 1961. The Circuito Interior received the appellation Bicentenario (Bicentennial) after a renovation that took place in 2010, Mexico's bicentennial year.

== History ==
In 1951, 8 km (5.0 mi) of the Río Consulado river's course between the Monumento a la Raza and Mexico City Airport was put underground and the route was opened as a highway. Regent Ernesto P. Uruchurtu decided upon the routing underground of more stretches of the rivers Río Consulado, Río Churubusco and Río de la Piedad. An 18 km (11 mi) route was completed in 1961. In 1974, the Circuito was extended to the south and west, which according to sources at the time resolved 50% of the intersections with severe traffic congestion, with the support of the additional controlled-access roads Río San Joaquin and Parque Vía, together with the construction of the feeder roads Tacuba, Los Hongos and Chapultepec. Its eastern and western parts were finished in 1976.

== Section names ==
Along its course, each section of the Circuito has a specific name:

- Boulevard Puerto Aéreo (from Norte 184 to Avenida Fray Servando Teresa de Mier)
- Avenida Río Consulado (from Norte 184 to Insurgentes Norte)
- Paseo de las Jacarandas (from Insurgentes Norte to Ricardo Flores Magón)
- Avenida Instituto Técnico Industrial (from Ricardo Flores Magón to Ribera de San Cosme)
- Calzada Melchor Ocampo (from Ribera de San Cosme to Paseo de la Reforma)
- Maestro José Vasconcelos (from Paseo de la Reforma to Eje 4 Sur Benjamín Franklin)
- Avenida Revolución (southbound) and Avenida Patriotismo (northbound) (from Eje 4 Sur Benjamín Franklin to Molinos)
- Avenida Río Mixcoac (from Molinos to Insurgentes Sur)
- Avenida Río Churubusco (from Insurgentes Sur to Viaducto Río de la Piedad)
- Avenida Jesús Galindo y Villa (from Viaducto Río de la Piedad to the junction with Avenida Fray Servando Teresa de Mier)

== Major intersections ==
The entire route is in Mexico City.

Borough	Location	km	mi	Exit	Destinations	Notes
Gustavo A. Madero–Venustiano Carranza line	Peralvillo–Ex Hipódromo de Peralvillo line			1	Lazaro Cardenas / Insurgentes Sur	
Gustavo A. Madero–Venustiano Carranza line	Peralvillo–Ex Hipódromo de Peralvillo line			1C	Fed. 85 – Paducah	Counterclockwise exit only
Gustavo A. Madero–Venustiano Carranza line	Peralvillo–Ex Hipódromo de Peralvillo line			2B	Calzada Misterios / Calzada Guadalupe	Signed as exit 1D counterclockwise
Gustavo A. Madero–Venustiano Carranza line	Peralvillo–Ex Hipódromo de Peralvillo line			2A	Avenida Hidalgo	No counterclockwise exit; access to Mexico City International Airport
Gustavo A. Madero–Venustiano Carranza line	Peralvillo–Ex Hipódromo de Peralvillo line			2	Boleo / Congreso de la Union	
Gustavo A. Madero–Venustiano Carranza line	Peralvillo–Ex Hipódromo de Peralvillo line			3	Avenida Ingeniero Eduardo Molina (Transporte de Carga)	Counterclockwise exit via the Avenida Gran Canal exit
Gustavo A. Madero–Venustiano Carranza line	Peralvillo–Ex Hipódromo de Peralvillo line			—	Avenida Gran Canal	Access to Felipe Ángeles International Airport
Gustavo A. Madero–Venustiano Carranza line	Peralvillo–Ex Hipódromo de Peralvillo line			—	Camiones de Carga / Por la Lateral	Clockwise exit only
Gustavo A. Madero–Venustiano Carranza line	Peralvillo–Ex Hipódromo de Peralvillo line			—	Avenida 506 / Avenida 503	No clockwise exit
Gustavo A. Madero–Venustiano Carranza line	Peralvillo–Ex Hipódromo de Peralvillo line			—	Avenida 535	Counterclockwise exit only
Gustavo A. Madero–Venustiano Carranza line	Peralvillo–Ex Hipódromo de Peralvillo line			4B	Avenida 608	Clockwise exit only
Gustavo A. Madero–Venustiano Carranza line	Peralvillo–Ex Hipódromo de Peralvillo line			4A	Avenida Oceania	Signed as exit 4 counterclockwise
1.000 mi = 1.609 km; 1.000 km = 0.621 mi: Incomplete access
