= Red de Transporte de Pasajeros =

Bus transport service of Mexico City

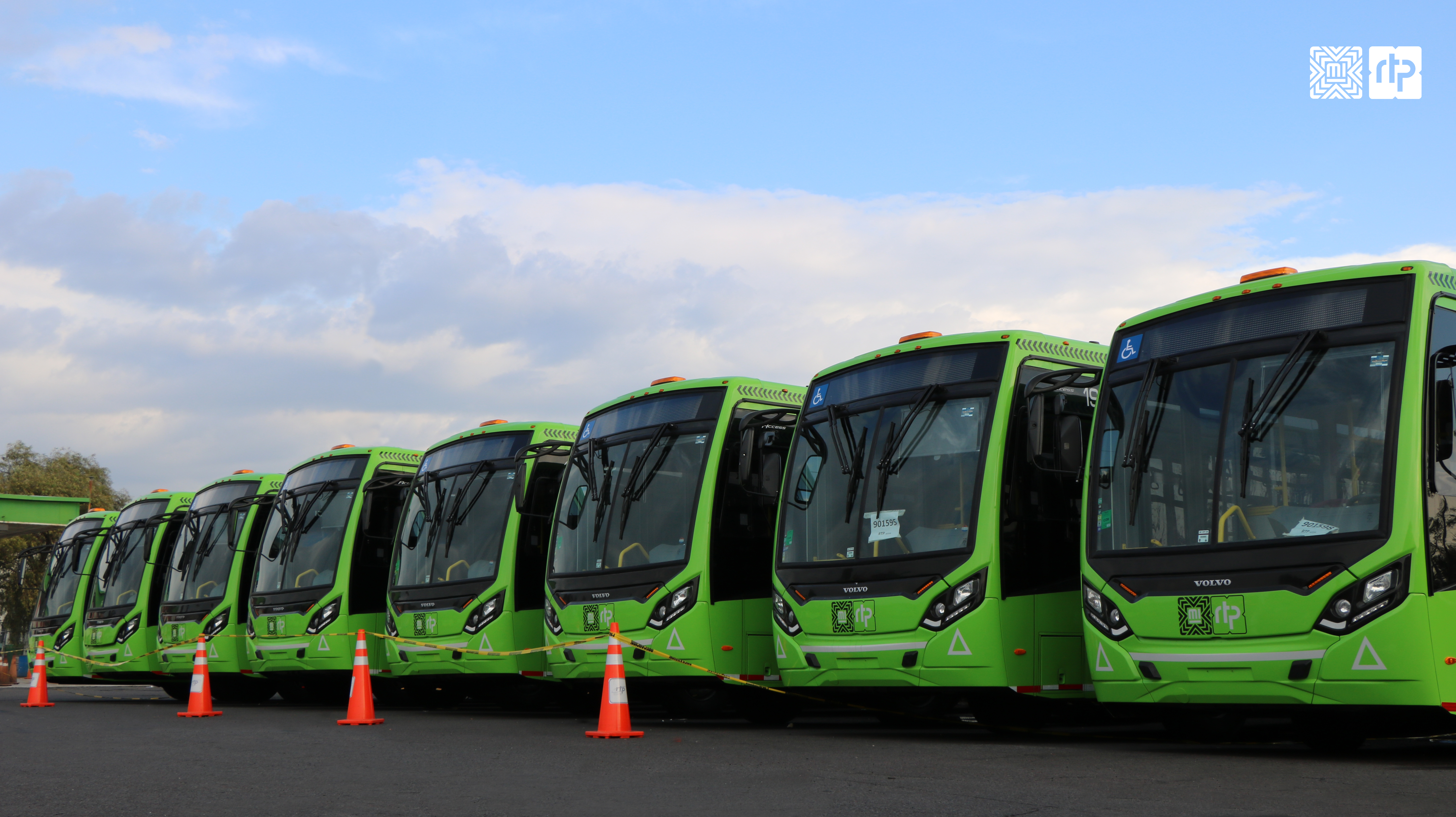
- New Volvo bus fleet for RTP (2019)
- Commenced operation: March 1, 2000
- Service area: Mexico City
- Daily ridership: 399,000 (2018)
- General Director: Ramón Jiménez López
- Website: rtp.cdmx.gob.mx
System map
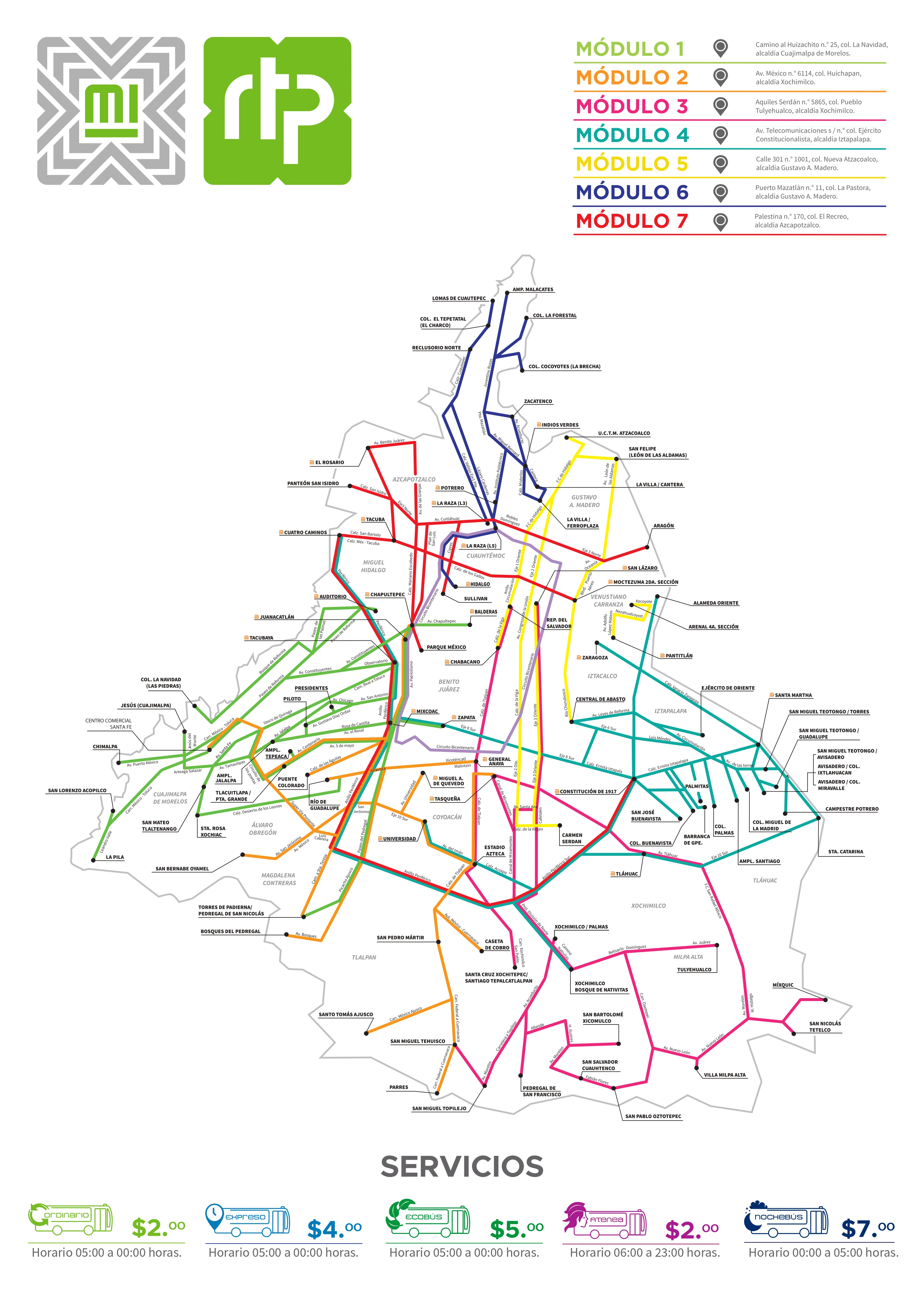

The Red de Transporte de Pasajeros de la Ciudad de México (RTP; English: Mexico City Passenger Transportation Network) offers urban bus service in Mexico City. It is administered by the Government of Mexico City and carries approximately 400,000 passengers per day on more than 100 routes.

== History ==
Public bus service in the Mexico City metropolitan area was provided by several private concessions starting from 1916, including the Lomas de Chapultepec Primera Clase, which was founded in 1942. That company faced bankruptcy in 1958 and was federalized when the Distrito Federal de México (DDF) took over operations, renaming the service to Lomas de Chapultepec–Reforma Ruta 100, which continued to compete with private companies until August 1981, when the DDF revoked private concessions and formed Autotransportes Urbanos de Pasajeros Ruta 100 (Route 100). On May 3, 1989 the Ruta 100 worker's union Sindicato Único de Trabajadores de Ruta 100 (SUTAUR 100) went on strike, asking for double their existing wages; the negotiated settlement included a 14% wage increase but also the elimination of approximately 1/3 of its 20,000 jobs. Ruta 100 continued to operate until April 7, 1995, when that system went bankrupt.

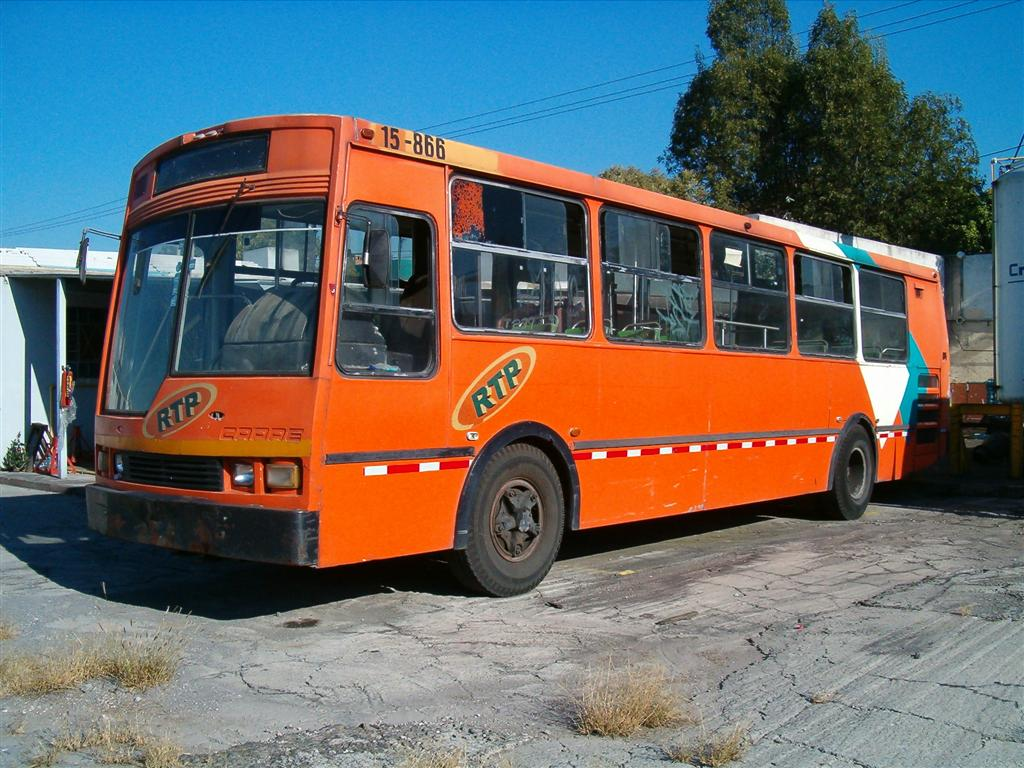
ex-Ruta 100 CAPRE bus repainted to RTP livery (orange with green and white stripes)

In 1994, Ruta 100 operated approximately 2,900 buses on 210 routes over a 7,500 km long (4,700 mi) network, carrying 2.9 million passengers per day. By 1997, that had collapsed to 176 routes over 5,934 km (3,687 mi), carrying 1.9 million passengers daily. With the demise of Ruta 100, part of the operator's fleet and employees were transferred to the Servicio de Transportes Eléctricos (STE) while the former network was operated by the Consejo de Incautación (Board of Seizure) under the Sistema Temporal de Transporte (STT; Temporary Transportation System), carrying 544 thousand daily passengers using 830 buses on 75 routes; the STT fleet was inherited by RTP when it was formed in January 2000.

A strike by Sindicato de Trabajadores de la Red de Transportes de Pasajeros (STRTP) was averted in 2014 when the Distrito Federal agreed to grant STRTP workers a 4% increase in wages and a reduction to 40 hours per week. The name of the system changed to Sistema de Movilidad 1 (M1, Mobility System 1) on June 15, 2016, but the name change was reverted to RTP in January 2019.

== Services ==
RTP offers several service classes:

- Ordinario (Ordinary): 95 routes, N$ 2 fare
- Expreso (Express): 25 routes, N$ 4 fare
- Ecobús (Eco-friendly): CNG, N$ 5 fare
- Atenea (Athena): women-only service, N$ 2 fare
- Escolar (School):
- Nochebús (Night): 6 routes, N$ 7 fare

== Routes ==
Routes are divided into seven geographical areas (Módulo):

1. Camino al Huizachito no. 25, col. La Navidad, alcaldía Cuajimalpa de Morelos
2. Av. México No. 6114, col. Huichapan, alcaldía Xochimilco
3. Aquiles Serdán no. 5865, col. Pueblo Tulyehualco, alcaldía Xochimilco
4. Av. Telecomunicaciones s/no. Col. Ejército Constitucionalista, alcaldía Iztapalapa
5. Calle 301 No. 1001, col. Nueva Atzacoalco, alcaldía Gustavo A. Madero
6. Puerto Mazatlán no. 11, col. La Pastora, alcaldía Gustavo A. Madero
7. Palestina no. 170, col. El Recreo, alcaldía Azcapotzalco

== Vehicles ==
In 2020, RTP operated 1,279 buses, divided into the following services and types:

- 72 Ecobús
- 152 Atenea
- 349 Expreso
- 566 Ordinario
- 105 Escolar
- 22 articulated
- 13 bi-articulated
