= Doctores metro station =

Mexico City Metro station

Doctores
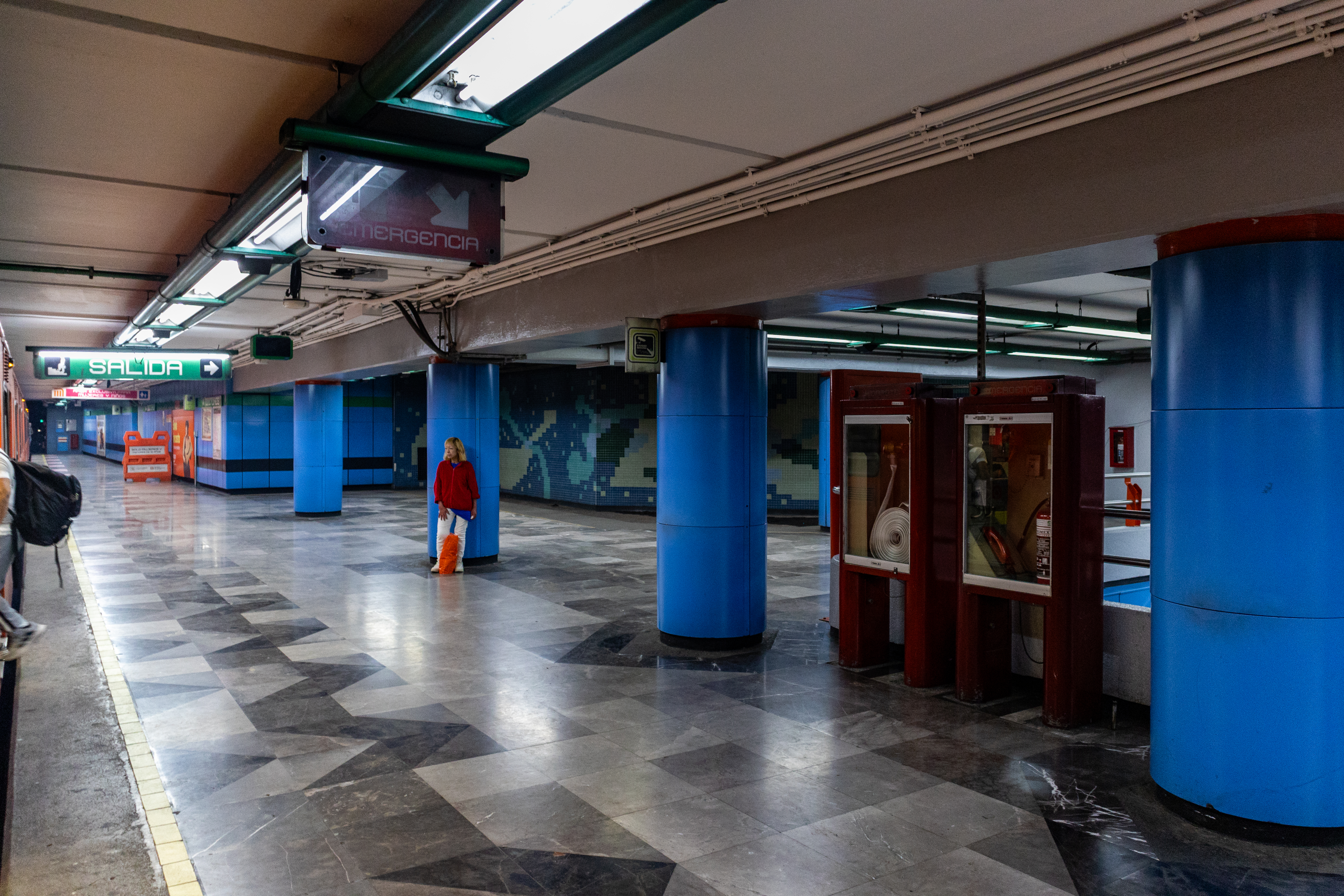
- Platforms, 2025

General information
- Location: Eje Central; Cuauhtémoc, Mexico City; Mexico
- Coordinates: 19°25′18″N 99°08′36″W
- System: Mexico City Metro
- Owner: Government of Mexico City
- Operator: Sistema de Transporte Colectivo (STC)
- Platforms: 2 side platforms
- Tracks: 2
- Connections: Trolleybus Line 1: Doctores

Construction
- Structure type: Underground
- Depth: 12 m (39 ft)

Other information
- Status: In service

History
- Opened: 20 July 1994

Passengers
- 2025: 3,542,109 (Note: The system's website counts only passenger entries into stations and does not include passengers passing through, transferring between lines, or exiting the station. The data here is limited to the most recent ten years to avoid excessive listings; earlier figures can be found in this page's history or on the Mexico City Metro website. To calculate the average daily ridership, the annual total is divided by 365 days (366 in leap years), with decimals omitted from the result. Each station per line is ranked individually, as the system counts transfer stations separately. The percentage change is calculated automatically using the data from the current year and the previous year.) ▼9.66%
- Rank: 142/195

Services
Preceding station	Mexico City Metro	Following station
Salto del Agua toward Garibaldi / Lagunilla	Line 8	Obrera toward Constitución de 1917
Route map
Location
- Location within Mexico City
- Area map and exits

Doctores metro station (Note: Estación del Metro Doctores. Spanish pronunciation: [doɣ'tores]. The name of the station literally means "Physicians" or "Doctors" in Spanish.) is a station of the Mexico City Metro in the city's borough of Cuauhtémoc. It is an underground stop that serves Line 8 (Green Line) between Salto del Agua and Obrera, servicing the colonias (neighborhoods) of Doctores and Obrera. Its name references the neighborhood and its pictogram depicts a couple of physicians.

Doctores metro station opened on 20 July 1994 providing service north toward Garibaldi and south toward Constitución de 1917. In 2025, the station had an average daily ridership of 9,704 passenger entries, making it the 142nd busiest station in the network.

== Location and layout ==
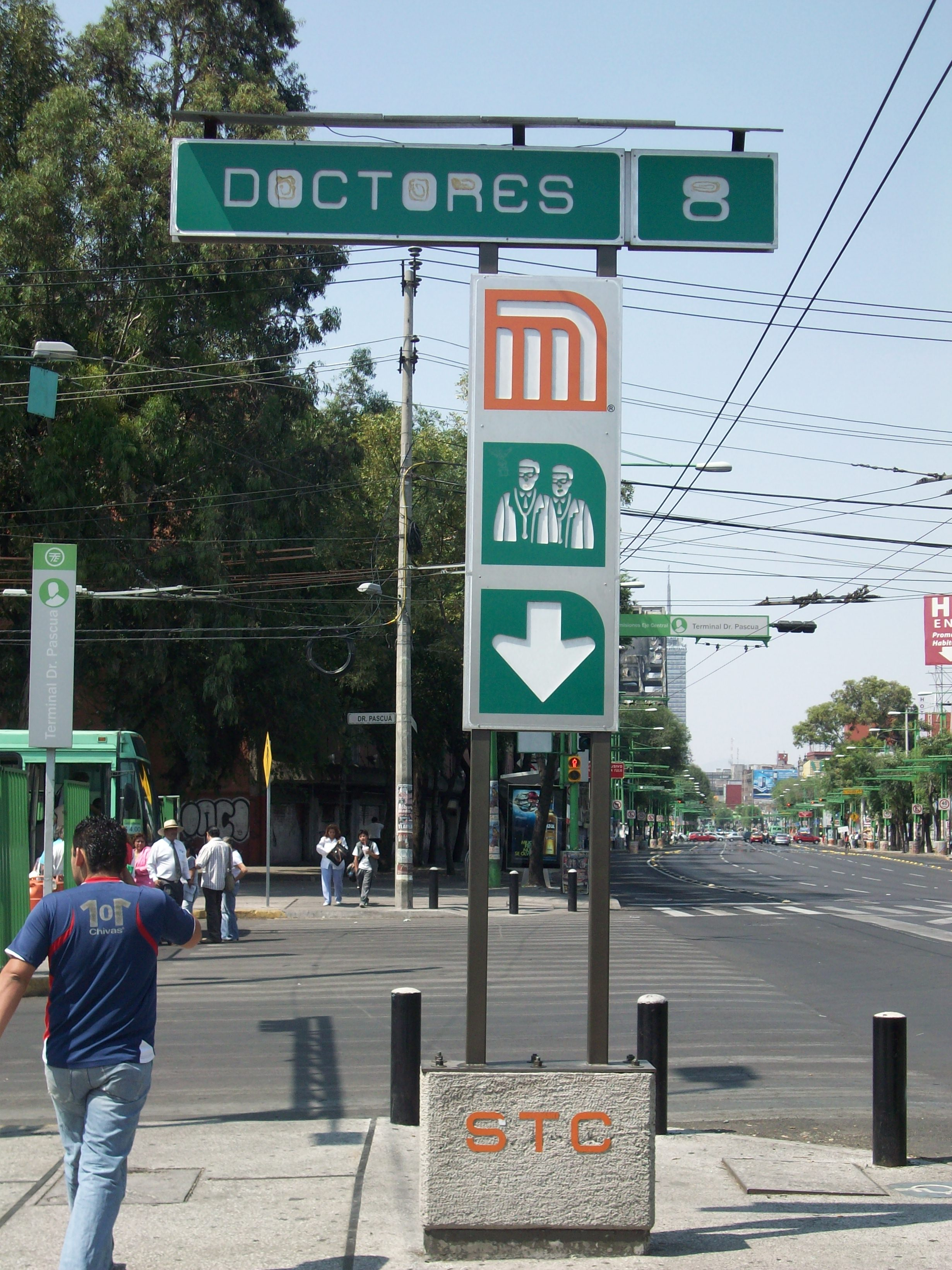
Eje Central Avenue and Dr. Pascua Street in 2011

Doctores is an underground metro station on Line 8 below Eje Central, in the Colonias (neighborhoods) of Doctores and Obrera, in central Mexico City.

Doctores metro station has four exits leading to Eje Central. In Colonia Doctores, the northeastern exit is at the corner of Calle Chimalpopoca, and the northwestern exit is at Calle Dr. Pascua. In Colonia Obrera, one exit is at the corner of Calle Lucas Alamán, and the southwestern exit is at Calle Dr. Liceaga. The station is located between Salto del Agua and Obrera stations on the line. The area is serviced by Line 1 (formerly Line A) of the trolleybus system.

== History and construction ==
Line 8 of the Mexico City Metro was built by Empresas ICA. The line was opened on 20 July 1994, operating from Garibaldi to Constitución de 1917. The tunnel stretch between Doctores and Salto del Agua spans 564 meters (1,850 ft), while the segment toward Obrera measures 761 meters (2,497 ft).

Workers uncovered "floors, walls, rammed earth, offerings, canals, chinampas, and piles" during the construction of the tunnel between José María Izazaga and Chimalpopoca streets, located between Doctores and Salto del Agua stations.

=== Name and pictogram ===
The station's pictogram features the silhouette of two physicians referencing the Doctores neighborhood, where the streets are named after academic physicians active during La Reforma (1850s).

=== Incidents ===
Following heavy rains and water accumulation in the tunnel, all stations between Doctores and Iztacalco were closed on 3 July 2021.

== Ridership ==
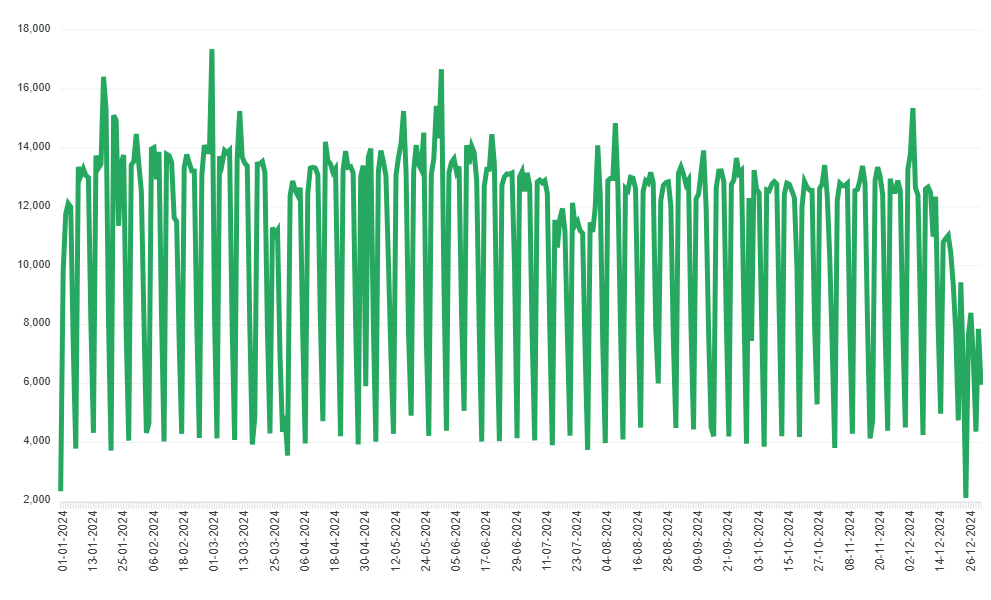
Daily ridership for Doctores station in 2024

According to official data, before the impact of the COVID-19 pandemic, the station recorded between 11,600 and 12,400 average daily entries from 2016 to 2019. In 2025, it recorded 3,542,109 passenger entries, ranking 142nd among the system's 195 stations.

Annual passenger ridership
Year	Ridership	Average daily	Rank	% change	Ref.
2025	3,542,109	9,704	142/195	−9.66%	
2024	3,921,067	10,713	124/195	+11.60%	
2023	3,513,423	9,625	123/195	−8.76%	
2022	3,850,947	10,550	114/195	+28.84%	
2021	2,988,875	8,188	109/195	+3.45%	
2020	2,889,069	7,893	122/195	−35.83%	
2019	4,502,133	12,334	138/195	+2.48%	
2018	4,393,370	12,036	136/195	+2.88%	
2017	4,270,296	11,699	137/195	−5.51%	
2016	4,519,391	12,348	132/195	+1.44%	

== Gallery ==
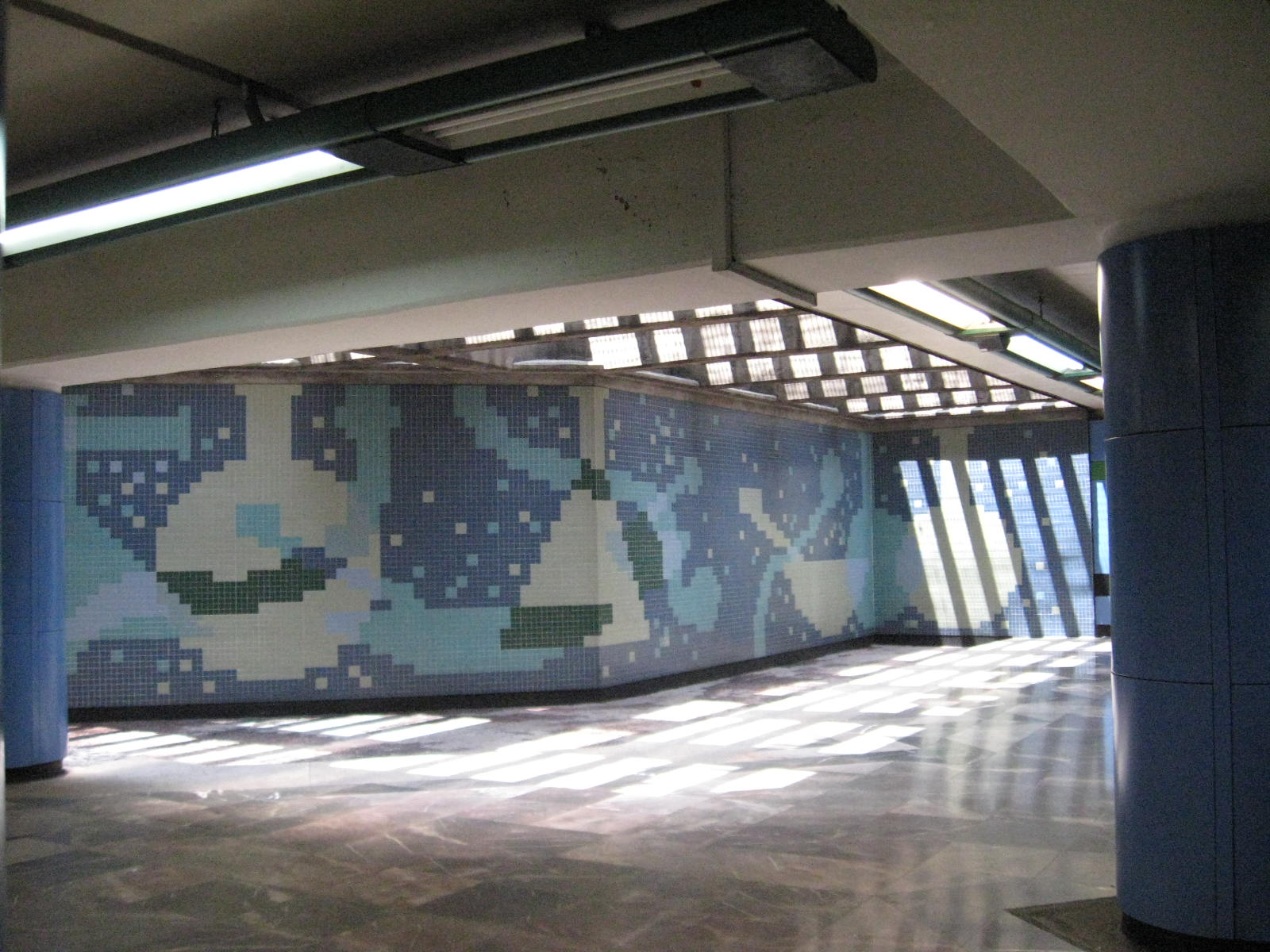
Mosaic design on one of the station walls. It features the silhouettes of flasks and mortars and pestles.
