= Escuadrón 201 metro station =

Mexico City metro station

Escuadrón 201
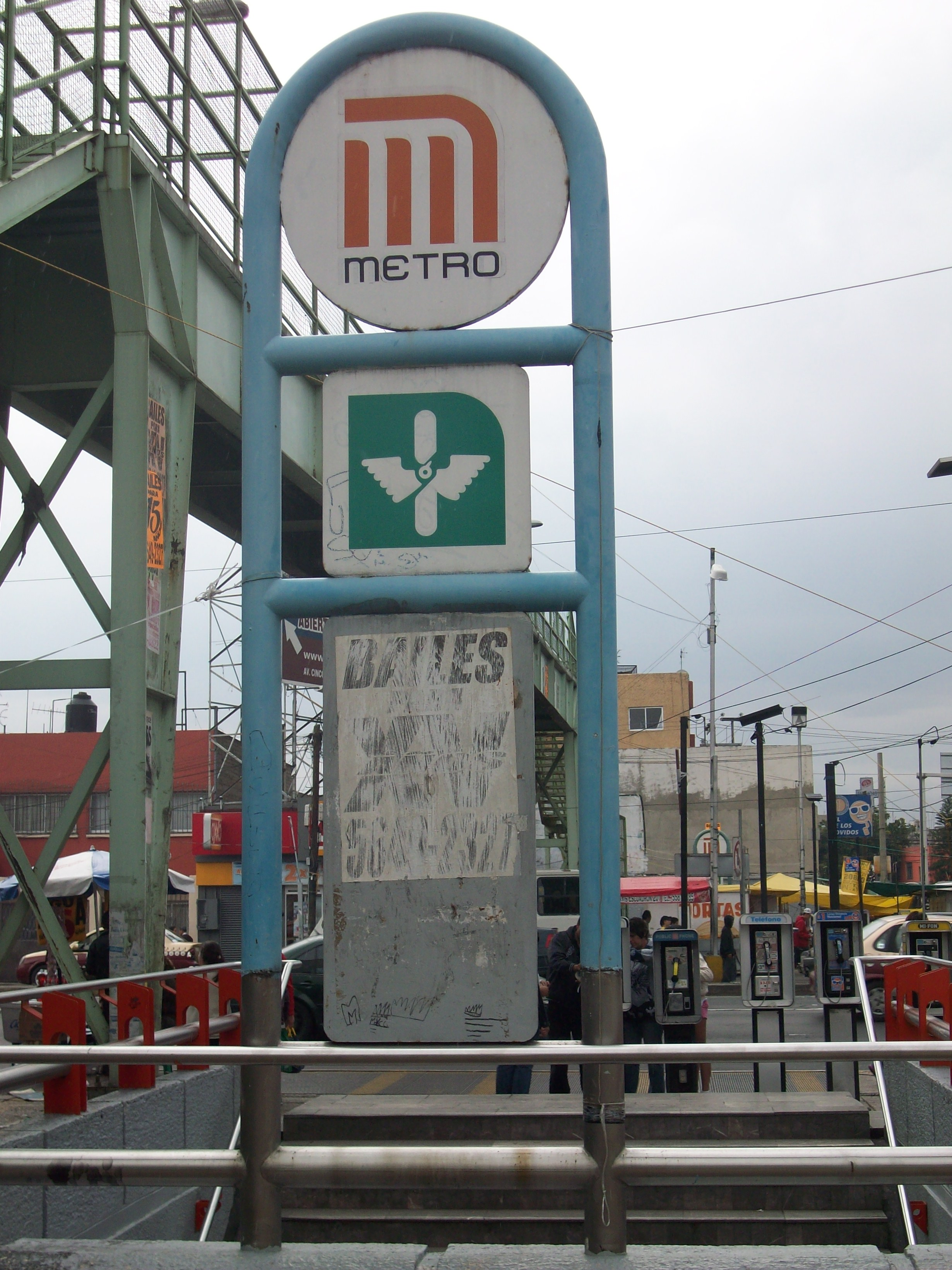
- Entrance to Escuadrón 201, 15 July 2012

General information
- Coordinates: 19.36492°N 99.109554°W
- System: Mexico City Metro
- Platforms: 2 side platform
- Tracks: 2
- Connections: Escuadrón 201

Construction
- Structure type: Underground

History
- Opened: 20 July 1994

Passengers
- 2025: 6,476,990 (Note: The data here is limited to the most recent ten years to avoid excessive listings; earlier figures can be found in this page's history or on the Mexico City Metro website. To calculate the average daily ridership, the annual total is divided by 365 days (366 in leap years), with decimals omitted from the result. Each station per line is ranked individually, as the system counts transfer stations separately. The percentage change is calculated automatically using the data from the current year and the previous year.) ▼3.62%
- Rank: 68/195

Services
Preceding station	Mexico City Metro	Following station
Aculco toward Garibaldi / Lagunilla	Line 8	Atlalilco toward Constitución de 1917
Route map
Location
- Location within Mexico City
- Area map

Escuadrón 201 is a metro station in Mexico City, Mexico. It is located in the city's eastern Iztapalapa borough, close to the intersection of Eje 3 Oriente (Axis 3 - East) and Eje 8 Sur (Axis 8 - South).

The station was named after the neighborhood in Iztapalapa that honors the Escuadrón 201, the Mexican military aviation unit that assisted the United States in the Philippines during World War II.

The logo of the station is the insignia of Escuadrón 201. It was opened on 20 July 1994.

== Ridership ==
Annual passenger ridership
Year	Ridership	Average daily	Rank	% change	Ref.
2025	6,476,990	17,745	68/195	−3.62%
2024	6,720,518	18,362	58/195	−10.09%
2023	7,474,532	20,478	49/195	+12.63%
2022	6,636,154	18,181	53/195	+46.59%
2021	4,527,035	12,402	60/195	−1.96%
2020	4,617,654	12,616	71/195	−42.62%
2019	8,047,639	22,048	76/195	−7.27%
2018	8,679,031	23,778	62/195	+5.20%
2017	8,250,338	22,604	68/195	−4.15%
2016	8,607,804	23,518	69/195	+1.35%
