= Coyuya metro station =

Mexico City metro station

Coyuya
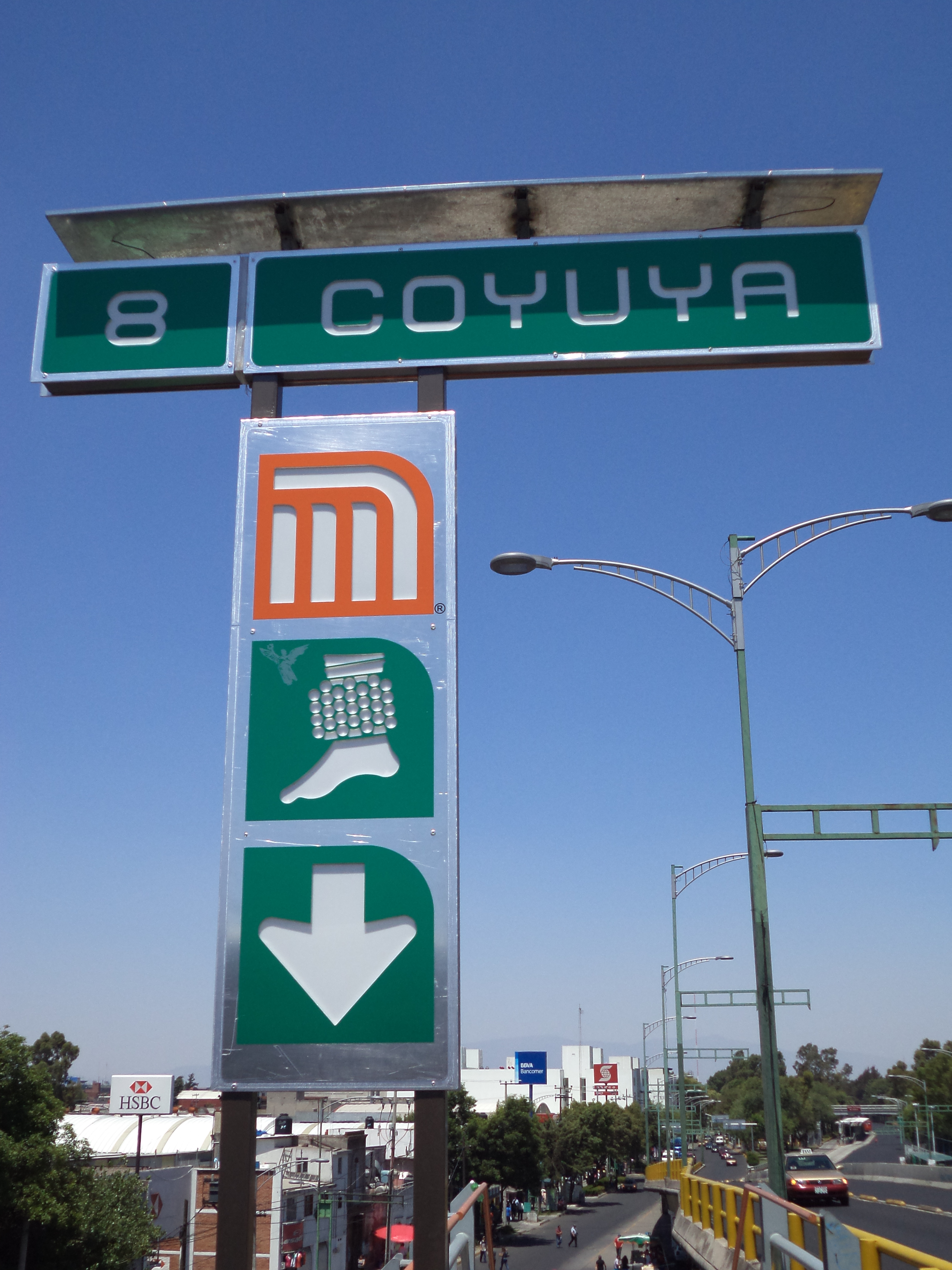

General information
- Coordinates: 19.398521°N 99.113545°W
- System: Mexico City Metro
- Operator: Sistema de Transporte Colectivo (STC)
- Platforms: 1 island platform
- Tracks: 2
- Connections: Metro Coyuya; Metro Coyuya

Construction
- Structure type: At grade

Other information
- Status: In service

History
- Opened: 20 July 1994

Passengers
- 2025: 8,518,725 (Note: The data here is limited to the most recent ten years to avoid excessive listings; earlier figures can be found in this page's history or on the Mexico City Metro website. To calculate the average daily ridership, the annual total is divided by 365 days (366 in leap years), with decimals omitted from the result. Each station per line is ranked individually, as the system counts transfer stations separately. The percentage change is calculated automatically using the data from the current year and the previous year.) ▼5.1%
- Rank: 42/195

Services
Preceding station	Mexico City Metro	Following station
Santa Anita toward Garibaldi / Lagunilla	Line 8	Iztacalco toward Constitución de 1917
Route map
Location
- Location within Mexico City
- Area map

Coyuya is a station on the Mexico City Metro.

== General information ==
Coyuya is on Line 8, between Metro Santa Anita and Metro Iztacalco. It is located in the Iztacalco borough, in the eastern portion of the Mexican Federal District, and serves the Colonia Tlazintla district and neighbourhoods surrounding Avenida Coyuya, Avenida Francisco del Paso y Troncoso (eje 3-Ote), and Avenida Plutarco Elías Calles (eje 4-Sur). A surface station, it was first opened to public passenger traffic on 20 July 1994.

=== Ridership ===
Annual passenger ridership
Year	Ridership	Average daily	Rank	% change	Ref.
2025	8,518,725	23,338	42/195	−5.10%
2024	8,976,978	24,527	37/195	+11.86%
2023	8,025,183	21,986	42/195	+3.74%
2022	7,735,951	21,194	38/195	+38.61%
2021	5,581,291	15,291	39/195	+11.67%
2020	4,998,200	13,656	57/195	−41.21%
2019	8,501,595	23,292	61/195	+2.68%
2018	8,279,437	22,683	71/195	+7.88%
2017	7,674,640	21,026	81/195	+0.83%
2016	7,611,525	20,796	86/195	+1.45%

== Name and iconography ==
The station logo depicts the ankle of an Aztec dancer festooned with a cuff-rattle made from nutshells – a pre-Hispanic musical instrument known by the Spanish name cascabel (similar to jingle bells). "Coyuya" is a Nahuatl toponym that means "place where cascabeles are made".
