= San Juan de Letrán metro station =

Mexico City metro station

San Juan de Letrán
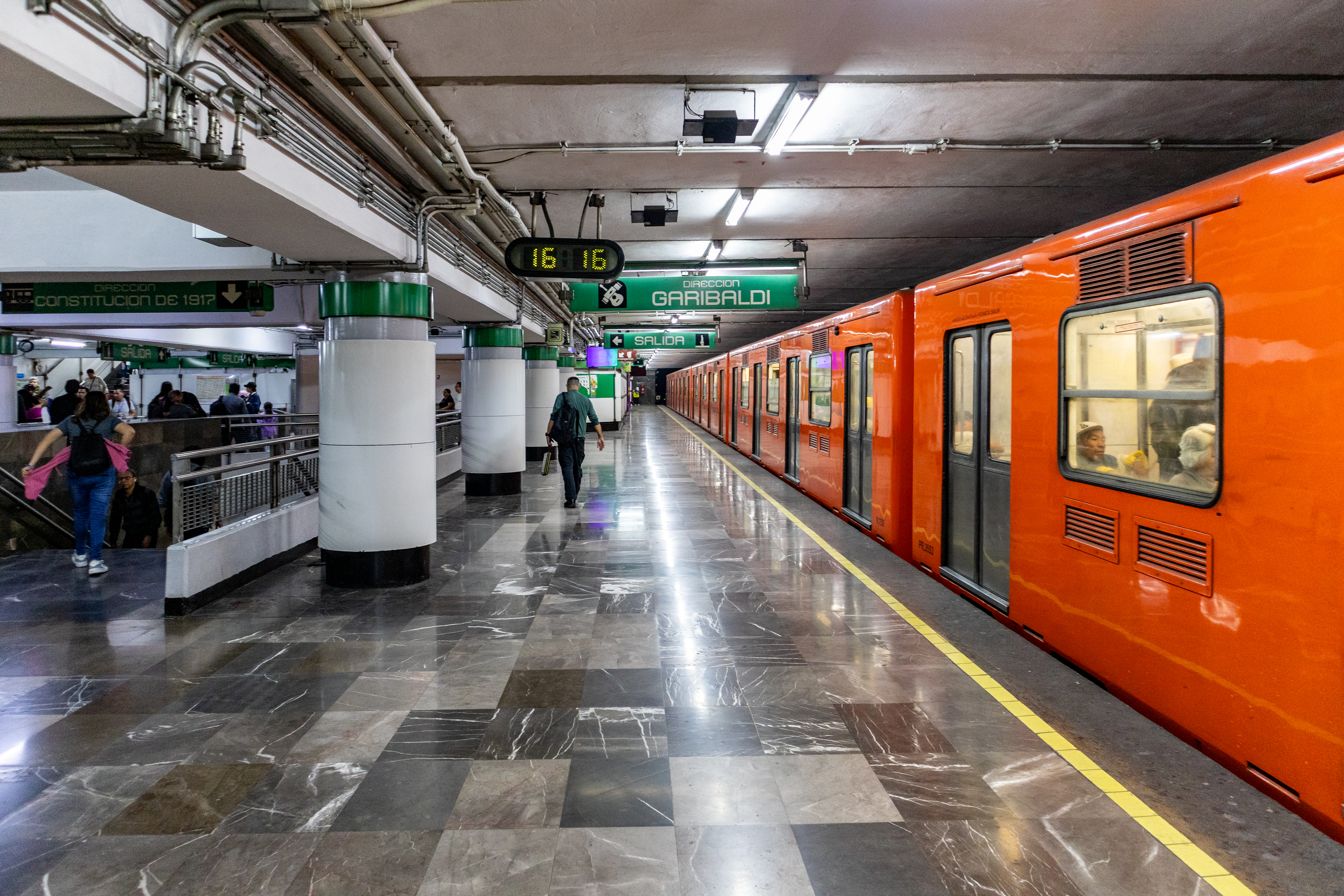

General information
- Coordinates: 19.431305°N 99.141569°W
- System: Mexico City Metro
- Platforms: 2 side platforms
- Tracks: 2
- Connections: Eje Central

Construction
- Structure type: Underground
- Parking: No

History
- Opened: 20 July 1994

Passengers
- 2025: 7,997,697 (Note: The data here is limited to the most recent ten years to avoid excessive listings; earlier figures can be found in this page's history or on the Mexico City Metro website. To calculate the average daily ridership, the annual total is divided by 365 days (366 in leap years), with decimals omitted from the result. Each station per line is ranked individually, as the system counts transfer stations separately. The percentage change is calculated automatically using the data from the current year and the previous year.) ▼5.45%
- Rank: 46/195

Services
Preceding station	Mexico City Metro	Following station
Bellas Artes toward Garibaldi / Lagunilla	Line 8	Salto del Agua toward Constitución de 1917
Route map
Location
- Location within Mexico City
- Area map

San Juan de Letrán is a metro station along Line 8 of the Mexico City Metro. It is located in Mexico City's Cuauhtémoc borough in the city centre, or Centro.

The station logo depicts the silhouette of the nearby Torre Latinoamericana, and the name San Juan de Letrán is the name of a church in Rome, Italy. San Juan de Letrán was the former name of Mexico City's central avenue, on which the station stands. Another stretch further south was named Avenida Niño Perdido ("Lost Child"). Today its name is Eje Central Lázaro Cárdenas. The station was opened, along with all the others on Line 8, on 20 July 1994.

== Ridership ==
Annual passenger ridership
Year	Ridership	Average daily	Rank	% change	Ref.
2025	7,997,697	21,911	46/195	−5.45%
2024	8,458,803	23,111	42/195	−3.60%
2023	8,774,818	24,040	31/195	+5.64%
2022	8,306,364	22,757,	29/195	+31.43%
2021	6,320,155	17,315	32/195	+11.05%
2020	5,691,465	15,550	48/195	−42.87%
2019	9,962,243	27,293	51/195	−1.25%
2018	10,088,092	27,638	49/195	−4.55%
2017	10,569,327	28,957	45/195	−6.36%
2016	11,286,742	30,838	42/195	−0.67%
