= Iztapalapa metro station =

Mexico City metro station

Iztapalapa
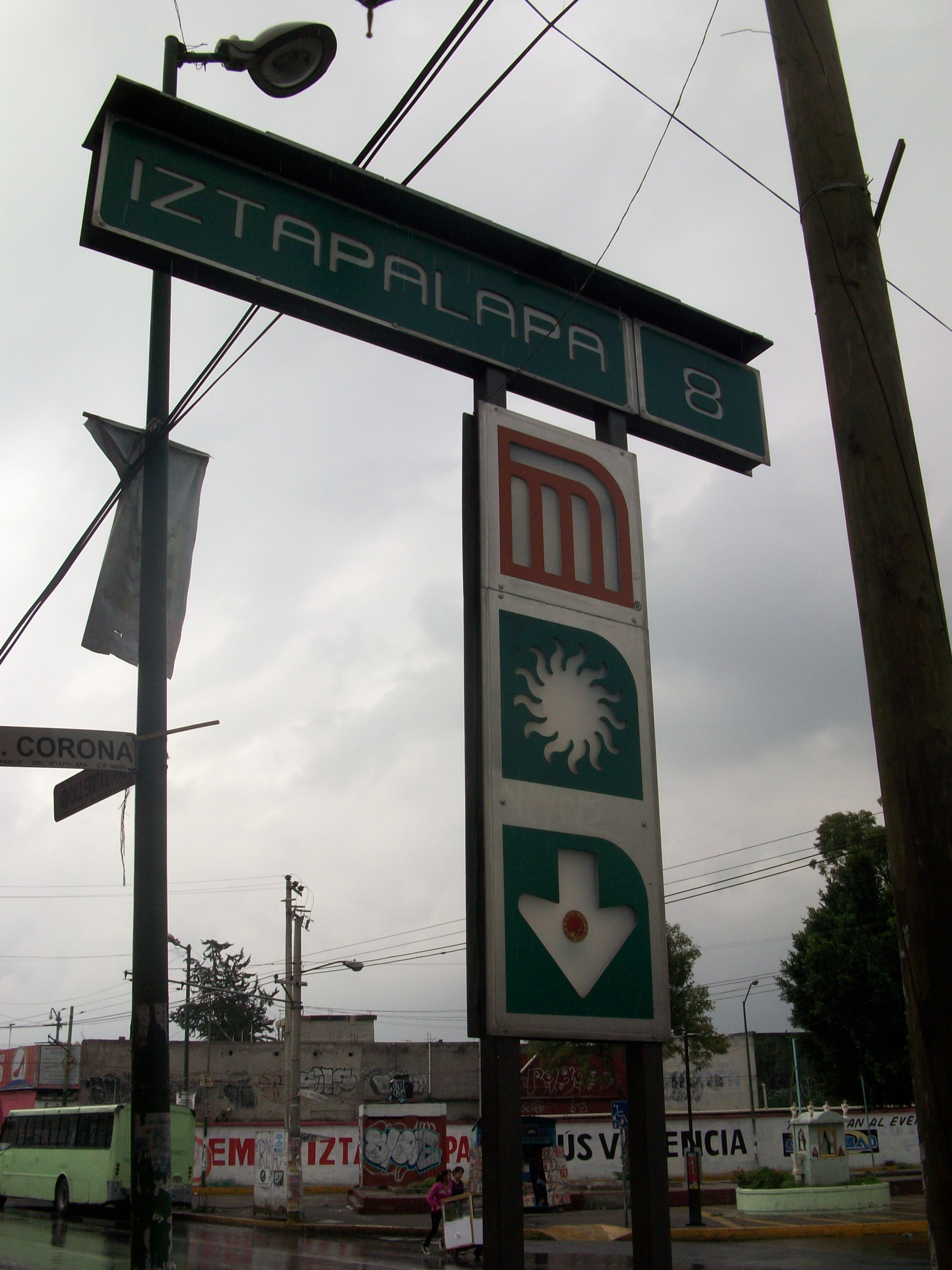

General information
- Coordinates: 19.357834°N 99.093461°W
- System: Mexico City Metro
- Platforms: 2 side platforms
- Tracks: 2

Construction
- Structure type: Underground

History
- Opened: 20 July 1994

Passengers
- 2025: 3,332,124 (Note: The data here is limited to the most recent ten years to avoid excessive listings; earlier figures can be found in this page's history or on the Mexico City Metro website. To calculate the average daily ridership, the annual total is divided by 365 days (366 in leap years), with decimals omitted from the result. Each station per line is ranked individually, as the system counts transfer stations separately. The percentage change is calculated automatically using the data from the current year and the previous year.) ▲1%
- Rank: 146/195

Services
| Preceding station | Mexico City Metro | Following station |
|---|---|---|
| Atlalilco toward Garibaldi / Lagunilla | Line 8 | Cerro de la Estrella toward Constitución de 1917 |
Route map
Location
- Location within Mexico City
- Area map

Iztapalapa is a station along Line 8 of the metro of Mexico City. It is located on the Calzada Ermita Iztapalapa (also known as Eje 8 Sur) in the Colonia El Santuario neighborhood of Iztapalapa borough on the southeast side of the city.

The station's logo is a sun, representing the ceremony that is celebrated in Iztapalapa every year of the birth of the new sun.

The station was opened 20 July 1994. Estación Iztapalapa is also the name of a firefighting station in the borough.

== Ridership ==
Annual passenger ridership
| Year | Ridership | Average daily | Rank | % change | Ref. |
|---|---|---|---|---|---|
| 2025 | 3,332,124 | 9,129 | 146/195 | +1.00% |
| 2024 | 3,299,121 | 9,013 | 136/195 | −8.13% |
| 2023 | 3,591,111 | 9,838 | 122/195 | +5.48% |
| 2022 | 3,404,518 | 9,327 | 123/195 | +39.33% |
| 2021 | 2,443,580 | 6,694 | 123/195 | +2.65% |
| 2020 | 2,380,510 | 6,504 | 141/195 | −42.51% |
| 2019 | 4,140,807 | 12,200 | 145/195 | +4.33% |
| 2018 | 3,969,098 | 10,874 | 147/195 | +9.47% |
| 2017 | 3,625,823 | 9,933 | 153/195 | +10.98% |
| 2016 | 3,267,242 | 8,926 | 156/195 | −4.58% |
