= Salto del Agua metro station =

Mexico City metro station

Salto del Agua
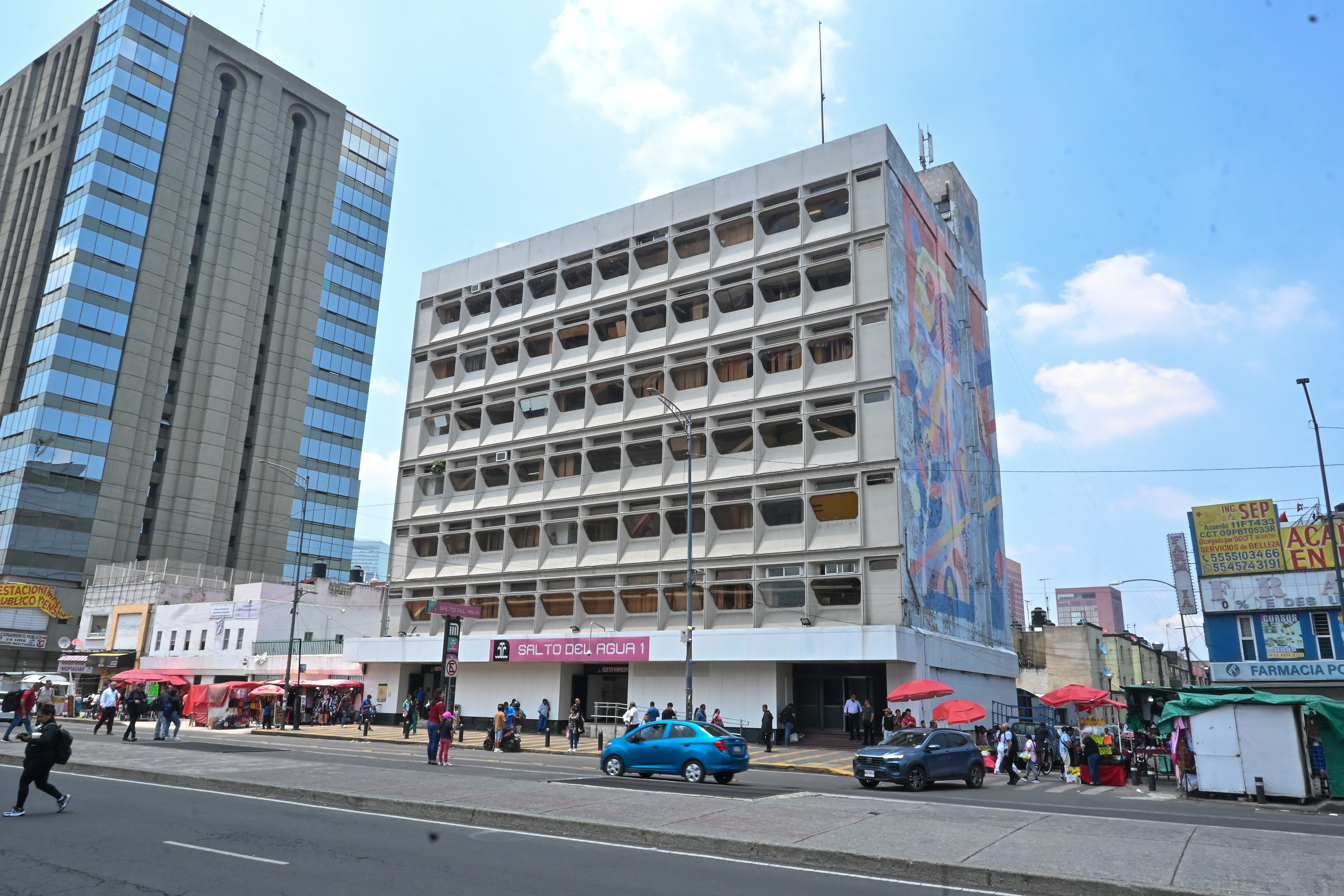
- Line 1 entrance

General information
- Location: Centro, Cuauhtémoc; Mexico City; Mexico
- Coordinates: 19.426813°N 99.142213°W
- System: Mexico City Metro
- Operator: Sistema de Transporte Colectivo (STC)
- Platforms: 2 side platforms 2 side platforms; 1 island platform
- Tracks: 4

Construction
- Structure type: Underground
- Parking: No
- Cycle facilities: No
- Accessible: Yes

Other information
- Status: In service

History
- Opened: 4 September 1969; 56 years ago 20 July 1994; 32 years ago

Key dates
- 9 July 2022: Temporarily closed
- 13 September 2024: Reopened

Passengers
- 2025: Total: 8,551,304; 4,112,807 (Note: The data here is limited to the most recent ten years to avoid excessive listings; earlier figures can be found in this page's history or on the Mexico City Metro website. To calculate the average daily ridership, the annual total is divided by 365 days (366 in leap years), with decimals omitted from the result. Each station per line is ranked individually, as the system counts transfer stations separately. The percentage change is calculated automatically using the data from the current year and the previous year.); 4,438,497 ▲5.15%
- Rank: 128/195; 119/195

Services
Preceding station	Mexico City Metro	Following station
Balderas toward Observatorio	Line 1	Isabel la Católica toward Pantitlán
San Juan de Letrán toward Garibaldi / Lagunilla	Line 8	Doctores toward Constitución de 1917
Route map
Location
- Location within Mexico City
- Area map

Salto del Agua is a metro (subway) station on the Mexico City Metro. It is located in the Cuauhtémoc borough in the center of Mexico City. Since 9 July 2022, the Line 1 station has remained closed modernization work on the tunnel and the line's technical equipment. The Line 1 station was reopened in September 13, 2024.

== Name and iconography ==
Its logo represents the Salto del Agua fountain. This fountain is at the end of the old Chapultepec Aqueduct, also known as the Belen aqueduct. This aqueduct ran from what is now Chapultepec Park, following Chapultepec Avenue and Arcos de Belen (Arches of Belen) Streets ending at this fountain. It lies on the border of the historic center, Colonia Doctores and Colonia Obrera. Contrary to popular belief, this fountain is not the original but rather a reproduction. The original fountain had deteriorated significantly, so architect Guillermo Ruiz was tasked with its reproduction, using the original engraved stone epigraphs as a model. What is left of the original fountain is in the National Museum of the Viceregal Period in Tepotzotlán.

== General information ==
Salto del Agua is a transfer station and contains a cultural display. It also has two kinds of architecture, one from Line 1 of the Metro, and the other, more modern style, of Line 8. Line 8 exits connect with Eje Central, which is filled in this zone with bookstores, boutiques, electronics shops, and street traders, locally known as vendedores ambulantes or "ambulantaje".

Metro Salto del Agua also transfers to trolleybus line "A", which runs the full length of Eje Central Lázaro Cárdenas and more, from Metro Autobuses del Norte and Metro Tasqueña – the city's main north and south intercity bus stations.

Inside the station is a mural entitled The Three Workers by artist Jason Schell.

=== Ridership ===
Annual passenger ridership (Line 1)
Year	Ridership	Average daily	Rank	% change	Ref.
2025	4,112,807	11,267	128/195	+378.95%
2024	858,711	2,346	185/195	NA
2023	0	0	188/195	−100.00%
2022	2,542,180	6,964	139/195	−41.82%
2021	4,369,643	11,971	67/195	−9.29%
2020	4,817,210	13,161	62/195	−35.62%
2019	7,482,564	20,500	86/195	+0.34%
2018	7,457,088	20,430	87/195	−2.65%
2017	7,660,338	20,987	83/195	−11.79%
2016	8,684,401	23,727	65/195	−2.70%

Annual passenger ridership (Line 8)
Year	Ridership	Average daily	Rank	% change	Ref.
2025	4,438,497	12,160	119/195	−13.91%
2024	5,155,400	14,085	89/195	−36.61%
2023	8,132,745	22,281	41/195	+32.61%
2022	6,132,781	16,802	60 /195	+97.92%
2021	3,098,577	8,489	106/195	+5.12%
2020	2,947,538	8,053	118/195	−45.96%
2019	5,454,216	14,943	120/195	−2.65%
2018	5,602,459	15,349	118/195	−6.05%
2017	5,963,274	16,337	110/195	−11.13%
2016	6,709,999	18,333	100/195	+0.65%

== Exits ==
=== Line 1 ===
- North: Avenida Arcos de Belén, Centro
- South: Avenida Arcos de Belén, Centro

=== Line 8 ===
- Northeast: Eje Central Lázaro Cárdenas and Plaza de las Vizcainas, Centro
- Northwest: Eje Central Lázaro Cárdenas and Delicias street, Centro
