= Aculco metro station =

Mexico City metro station

Aculco
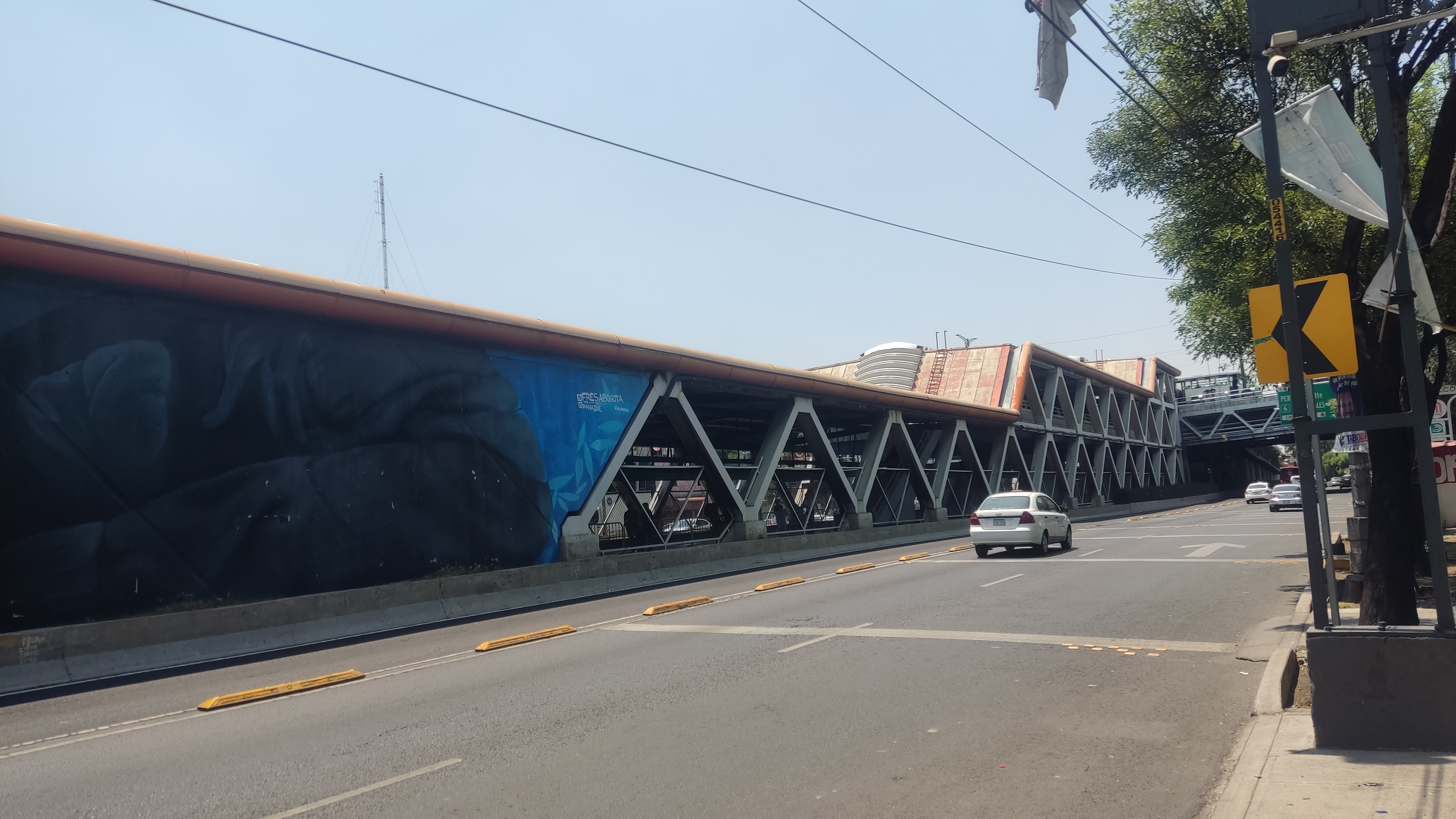

General information
- Location: Mexico
- Coordinates: 19.374069°N 99.108095°W
- System: Mexico City Metro
- Platforms: 1 island platform
- Tracks: 2
- Connections: Aculco

Construction
- Structure type: At grade

History
- Opened: 20 July 1994

Passengers
- 2025: 2,733,499 (Note: The data here is limited to the most recent ten years to avoid excessive listings; earlier figures can be found in this page's history or on the Mexico City Metro website. To calculate the average daily ridership, the annual total is divided by 365 days (366 in leap years), with decimals omitted from the result. Each station per line is ranked individually, as the system counts transfer stations separately. The percentage change is calculated automatically using the data from the current year and the previous year.) ▼5.61%
- Rank: 157/195

Services
Preceding station	Mexico City Metro	Following station
Apatlaco toward Garibaldi / Lagunilla	Line 8	Escuadrón 201 toward Constitución de 1917
Route map
Location
- Location within Mexico City
- Area map

Aculco is a station along Line 8 of the metro of Mexico City. It is located under the bridge where the Trabajadoras Sociales (Eje 6 Sur) passes over the Eje 3 Ote in the Colonia Pueblo Aculco neighborhood of the Iztapalapa borough of Mexico City. The station's logo is a water wave in a canal. In Nahuatl it means "where the water twists". The name is also the name of the Aculco municipality in the State of Mexico.

== History ==
The station was opened on 20 July 1994.

Metro service at the station was interrupted on 16 December 2006 after an accident in which a passenger fell onto the tracks. On 24 July 2007 a boy was born to a passenger at the station. On 26 September 2010 a Line 8 train operator was arrested and fired for drunk driving after an incident in which he opened the doors on the opposite side of the train from the Aculco station platform.

From 23 April to 18 June 2020, the station was temporarily closed due to the COVID-19 pandemic in Mexico.

== Ridership ==
Annual passenger ridership
Year	Ridership	Average daily	Rank	% change	Ref.
2025	2,733,499	7,489	157/195	−5.61%
2024	2,895,841	7,912	145/195	−8.54%
2023	3,166,138	8,674	130/195	+4.43%
2022	3,031,859	8,306	132/195	+30.86%
2021	2,316,884	6,347	128/195	+22.19%
2020	1,896,183	5,180	154/195	−46.20%
2019	3,524,731	9,656	156/195	+0.04%
2018	3,523,188	9,652	156/195	+11.75%
2017	3,152,734	8,637	158/195	−2.90%
2016	3,247,038	8,871	158/195	−5.51%
