= Apatlaco metro station =

Mexico City metro station

Apatlaco
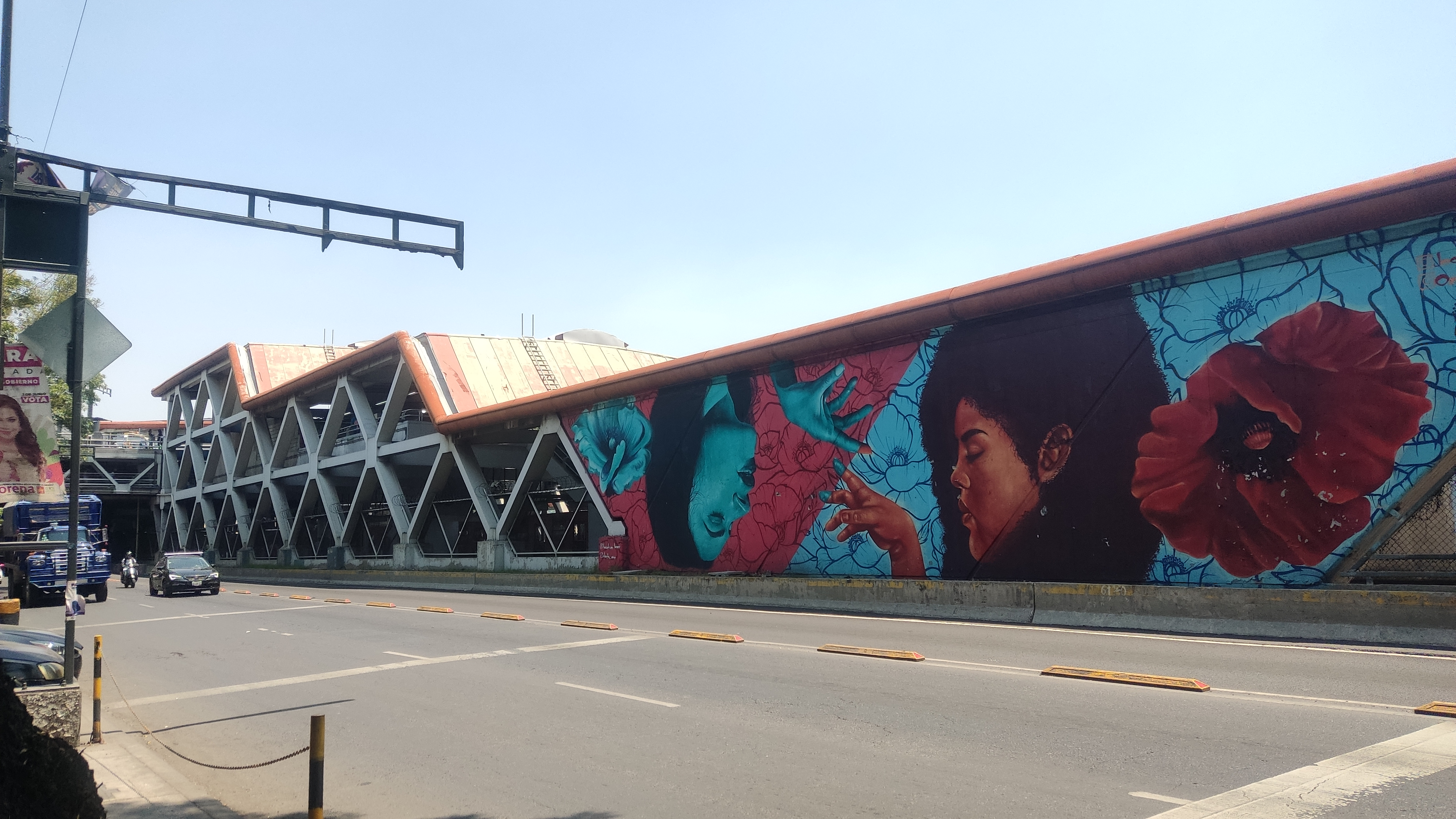

General information
- Location: Mexico
- Coordinates: 19.379292°N 99.109597°W
- System: Mexico City Metro
- Platforms: 1 island platform
- Tracks: 2
- Connections: Apatlaco; Apatlaco (Sundays only)

Construction
- Structure type: At grade

History
- Opened: 20 July 1994

Passengers
- 2025: 4,059,013 (Note: The data here is limited to the most recent ten years to avoid excessive listings; earlier figures can be found in this page's history or on the Mexico City Metro website. To calculate the average daily ridership, the annual total is divided by 365 days (366 in leap years), with decimals omitted from the result. Each station per line is ranked individually, as the system counts transfer stations separately. The percentage change is calculated automatically using the data from the current year and the previous year.) ▼4.58%
- Rank: 130/195

Services
Preceding station	Mexico City Metro	Following station
Iztacalco toward Garibaldi / Lagunilla	Line 8	Aculco toward Constitución de 1917
Route map
Location
- Location within Mexico City
- Area map

Apatlaco is a station along Line 8 of the metro of Mexico City.

The station's logo is a house with hot water and steam inside of it. Apatlaco is a Nahuatl word that means "place of medicinal baths". The station was opened on 20 July 1994.

Ridership at the station dipped during a swine flu panic in the spring of 2009.

== Ridership ==
Annual passenger ridership
Year	Ridership	Average daily	Rank	% change	Ref.
2025	4,059,013	11,120	130/195	−4.58%
2024	4,253,939	11,622	118/195	+11.10%
2023	3,828,847	10,489	116/195	+9.34%
2022	3,501,841	9,594	120/195	−4.75%
2021	3,676,323	10,072	83/195	+3.11%
2020	3,565,547	9,741	105/195	−30.10%
2019	5,100,848	13,974	128/195	+4.21%
2018	4,894,955	13,410	129/195	−8.20%
2017	5,332,327	14,609	118/195	+1.69%
2016	5,243,455	14,326	121/195	+3.35%
