= Cerro de la Estrella metro station =

Mexico City metro station

Cerro de la Estrella
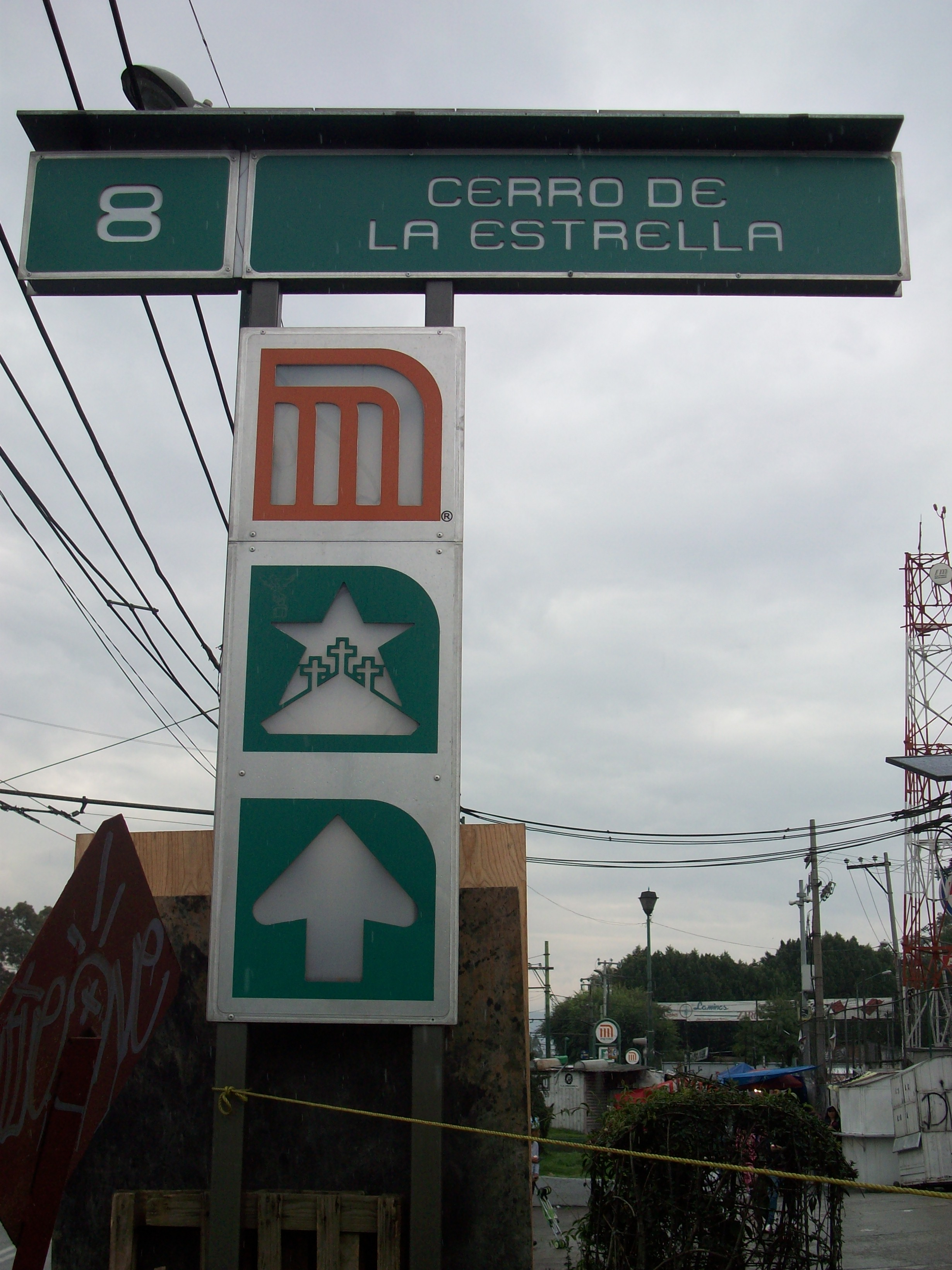

General information
- Coordinates: 19.356012°N 99.085522°W
- System: Mexico City Metro
- Platforms: 2 side platforms
- Tracks: 2

Construction
- Structure type: Underground

History
- Opened: 20 July 1994

Passengers
- 2025: 3,831,839 (Note: The data here is limited to the most recent ten years to avoid excessive listings; earlier figures can be found in this page's history or on the Mexico City Metro website. To calculate the average daily ridership, the annual total is divided by 365 days (366 in leap years), with decimals omitted from the result. Each station per line is ranked individually, as the system counts transfer stations separately. The percentage change is calculated automatically using the data from the current year and the previous year.) ▼4.04%
- Rank: 141/195

Services
| Preceding station | Mexico City Metro | Following station |
|---|---|---|
| Iztapalapa toward Garibaldi / Lagunilla | Line 8 | UAM-I toward Constitución de 1917 |
Route map
Location
- Location within Mexico City
- Area map

Cerro de la Estrella (English: Hill of the Star) is an underground station along Line 8 of the metro of Mexico City. The station is located along the Calzada Ermita-Iztapalapa and serves the Colonia Hidalgo y Mina neighborhood within the Iztapalapa borough on the east side of the city. The station is named for the Cerro de la Estrella, a mesoamerican archaeological site located nearby. It was opened on 20 July 1994.

The station's logo is the silhouette of a hill with three crosses on it and a star in the sky. In spring during Easter the station sees heavy traffic for spectators who travel to Cerro de la Estrella to watch Passion of the Christ procession events.

From 23 April to 18 June 2020, the station was temporarily closed due to the COVID-19 pandemic in Mexico.

== Ridership ==
Annual passenger ridership
| Year | Ridership | Average daily | Rank | % change | Ref. |
|---|---|---|---|---|---|
| 2025 | 3,578,601 | 9,804 | 141/195 | −4.04% |
| 2024 | 3,729,360 | 10,189 | 130/195 | −2.67% |
| 2023 | 3,831,839 | 10,498 | 115/195 | +11.39% |
| 2022 | 3,440,151 | 9,425 | 122/195 | +31.97% |
| 2021 | 2,606,672 | 7,141 | 120/195 | +18.20% |
| 2020 | 2,205,399 | 6,025 | 147/195 | −45.88% |
| 2019 | 4,074,999 | 11,164 | 148/195 | −5.80% |
| 2018 | 4,326,059 | 11,852 | 141/195 | +6.49% |
| 2017 | 4,062,511 | 11,130 | 141/195 | +1.01% |
| 2016 | 4,022,013 | 10,989 | 143/195 | +8.92% |
