= Obrera metro station =

Mexico City Metro station

Obrera
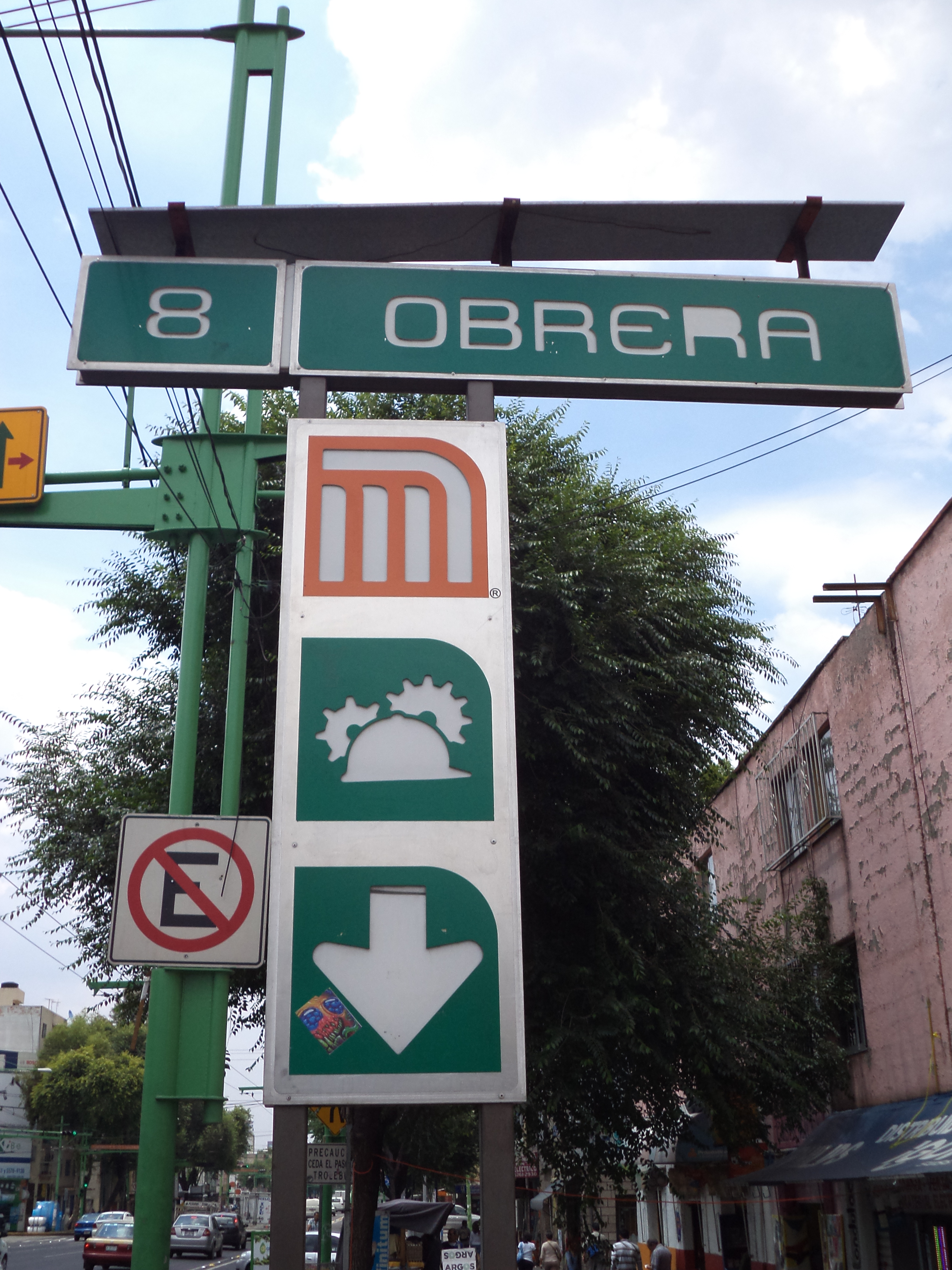

General information
- Location: Mexico
- Coordinates: 19.413558°N 99.144187°W
- System: Mexico City Metro
- Platforms: 2 side platforms
- Tracks: 2

Construction
- Structure type: Underground

History
- Opened: 20 July 1994

Passengers
- 2025: 4,080,264 (Note: The data here is limited to the most recent ten years to avoid excessive listings; earlier figures can be found in this page's history or on the Mexico City Metro website. To calculate the average daily ridership, the annual total is divided by 365 days (366 in leap years), with decimals omitted from the result. Each station per line is ranked individually, as the system counts transfer stations separately. The percentage change is calculated automatically using the data from the current year and the previous year.) ▼9.24%
- Rank: 129/195

Services
Preceding station	Mexico City Metro	Following station
Doctores toward Garibaldi / Lagunilla	Line 8	Chabacano toward Constitución de 1917
Route map
Location
- Location within Mexico City
- Area map

Obrera is a station along Line 8 of the metro of Mexico City. The station is situated on Eje Central Lázaro Cárdenas. The station's logo is a construction worker's helmet framed with two gears. The name obrera comes from the Colonia Obrera neighborhood where the station is located.

From 23 April to 18 June 2020, the station was temporarily closed due to the COVID-19 pandemic in Mexico.

== Ridership ==
Annual passenger ridership
Year	Ridership	Average daily	Rank	% change	Ref.
2025	4,080,264	11,178	129/195	−9.24%
2024	4,495,822	12,283	109/195	−6.52%
2023	4,809,299	13,176	98/195	+23.29%
2022	3,900,803	10,687	112/195	+22.58%
2021	3,182,282	8,718	105/195	+11.22%
2020	2,861,267	7,817	123/195	−35.75%
2019	4,452,999	12,200	140/195	+5.94%
2018	4,203,449	11,516	143/195	−6.32%
2017	4,487,072	12,293	134/195	−5.40%
2016	4,743,367	12,960	129/195	−7.44%
