= Eje Central =

Avenue in Mexico City, Mexico

Eje Central Lázaro Cárdenas
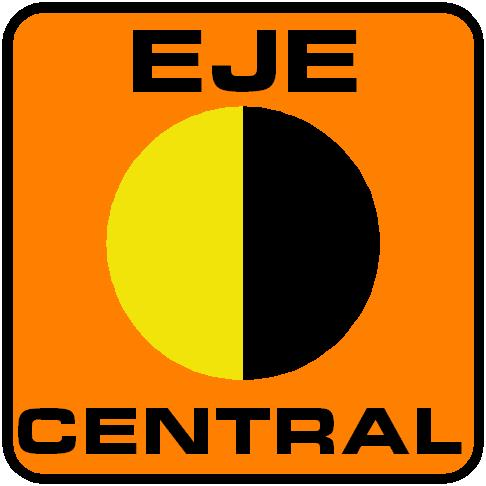

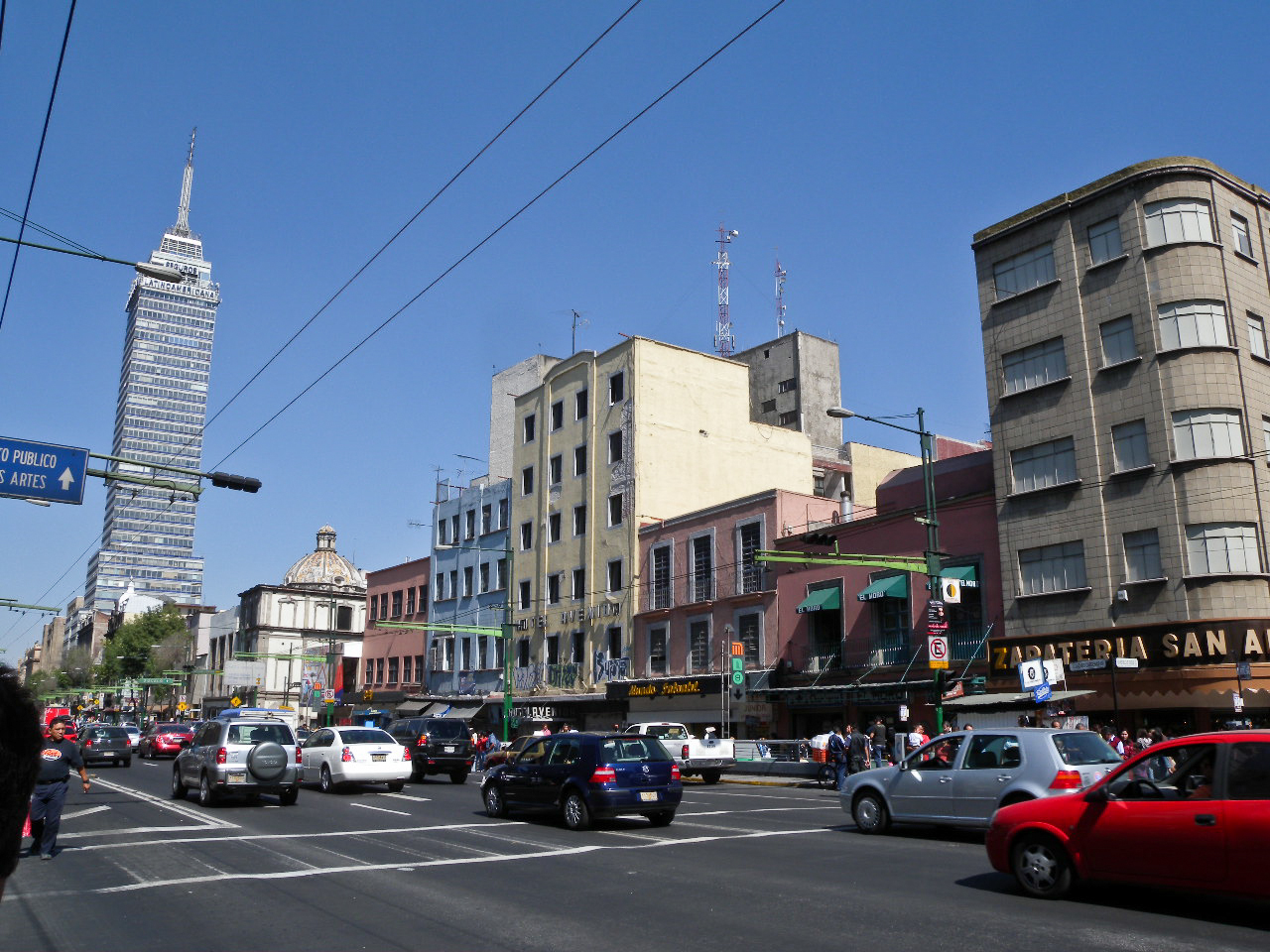
- Eje Central at downtown Mexico City.
- Interactive map of Eje Central Lázaro Cárdenas
- Former name(s): Avenida Panamá, Niño Perdido, San Juan de Letrán, Santa María la Redonda, Avenida de los 100 Metros
- Namesake: Lázaro Cárdenas
- Location: Mexico City, Mexico
- Nearest metro station: See Metro
- North end: Avenida Acueducto de Tenayuca
- Major junctions: Monumento a la Raza; Paseo de la Reforma
- South end: Circuito Interior Av. Río Churubusco

The Eje Central or Avenida Lázaro Cárdenas is an avenue in the Cuauhtémoc and Gustavo A. Madero boroughs of Mexico City, Mexico. It is part of a system called eje vial of roadways built by Carlos Hank González to modernize Mexico City for improved traffic flow through the city. As its name indicates, it runs through the central zones of the city, starting at Río de los Remedios Avenue (in the limits of Mexico City and Tlalnepantla, State of Mexico) and ending at Río Churubusco Avenue, near Eje Central metro station.

== Public transportation ==
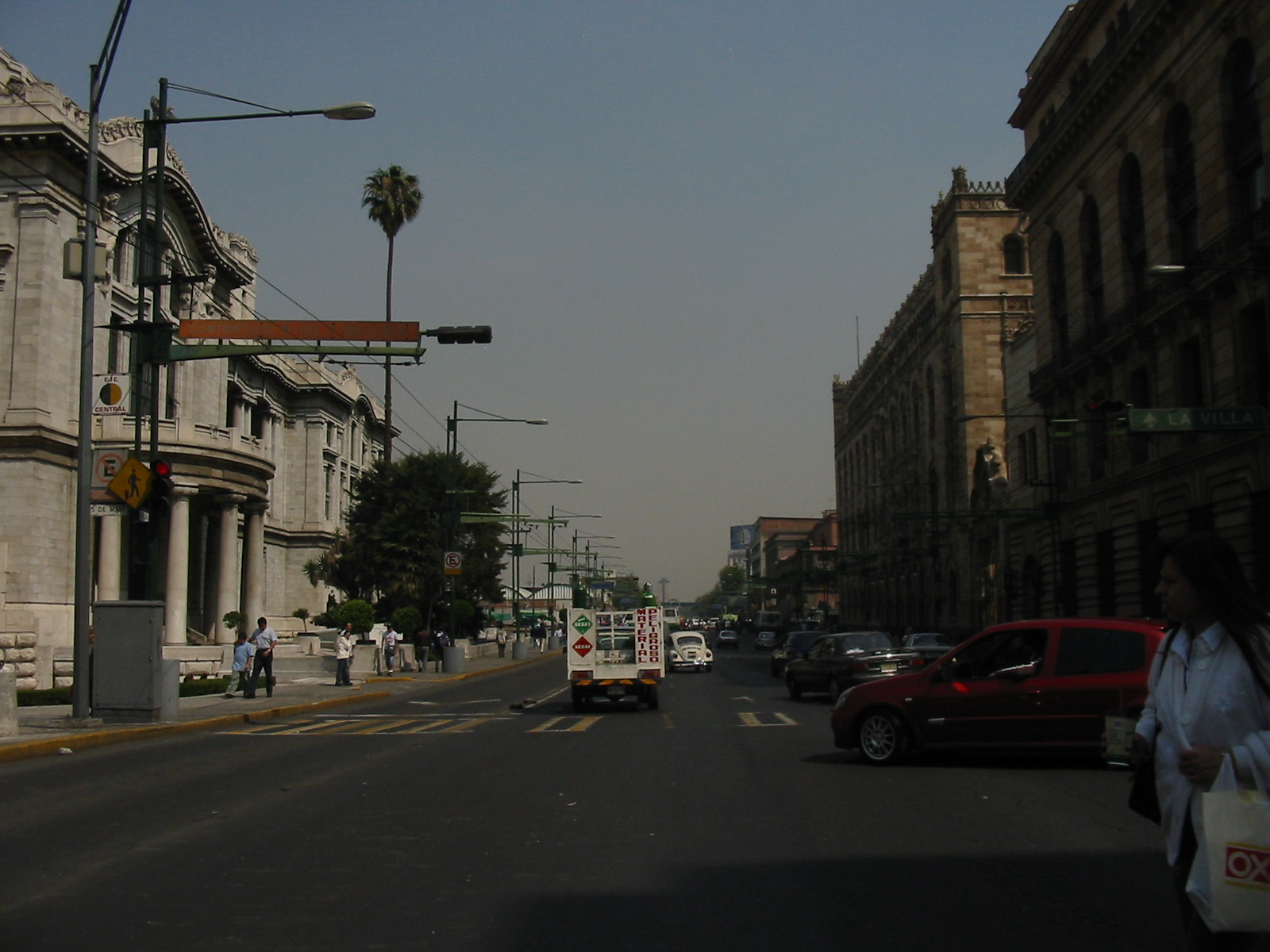
Eje Central looking north, with the Palacio de Bellas Artes on the left/west, and the Palacio de Correos de Mexico and Bank of Mexico on the right/east.

=== Metro ===
Several Mexico City Metro stations are also located on Eje Central, most notably the Eje Central station of Line 12. Line 8 runs under Eje Central on its stretch that crosses downtown Mexico City.

Metro stations

- Politécnico
- Autobuses del Norte
- Instituto del Petróleo
- La Raza
- Garibaldi / Lagunilla
- Bellas Artes
- San Juan de Letrán
- Salto del Agua
- Doctores
- Obrera
- Lázaro Cárdenas
- Eje Central

=== Trolleybus ===
Trolleybus Line 1, also known as Corredor Cero Emisiones Eje Central Lázaro Cárdenas (Zero Emissions Corridor), runs through Eje Central from the Northern Bus Station to the Southern Bus Station (near Tasqueña metro station).

== See also ==
- Eje vial, the whole system
- Streets in Mexico City
