= UAM-I metro station =

Mexico City metro station

UAM-I
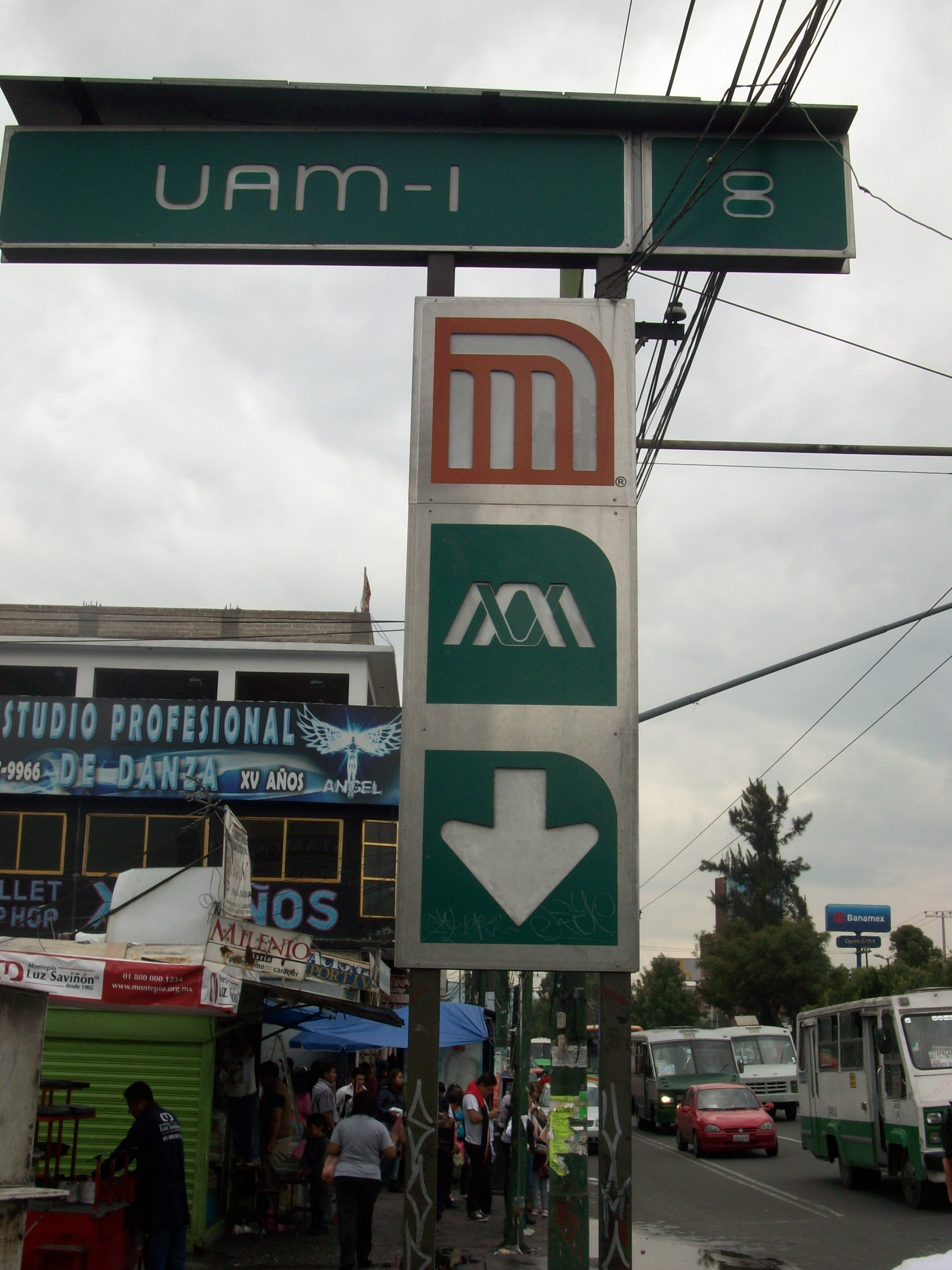

General information
- Location: Mexico
- Coordinates: 19.351234°N 99.074707°W
- System: Mexico City Metro
- Platforms: 2 side platforms
- Tracks: 2

Construction
- Structure type: Underground
- Platform levels: 1

History
- Opened: 20 July 1994
- Former names: La Purísima

Passengers
- 2025: 7,589,526 (Note: The data here is limited to the most recent ten years to avoid excessive listings; earlier figures can be found in this page's history or on the Mexico City Metro website. To calculate the average daily ridership, the annual total is divided by 365 days (366 in leap years), with decimals omitted from the result. Each station per line is ranked individually, as the system counts transfer stations separately. The percentage change is calculated automatically using the data from the current year and the previous year.) ▼4.47%
- Rank: 53/195

Services
| Preceding station | Mexico City Metro | Following station |
|---|---|---|
| Cerro de la Estrella toward Garibaldi / Lagunilla | Line 8 | Constitución de 1917 Terminus |
Route map
Location
- Location within Mexico City
- Area map

UAM-I is a station along Line 8 of the Mexico City Metro.

The station's logo is the logo of the Universidad Autónoma Metropolitana campus Iztapalapa, which is close to the station. The station was opened on 20 July 1994. Until September 1996 this station was known as La Purísima, the name of the street where it is located. The previous logo was the silhouette of the Virgin of Guadalupe.

== Curiosities ==
Although the name of the station has changed, it can be appreciated on the platforms the murals depicting La Purísima. That is, as the station was opened with that name, and until being renamed UAM-I, still keeps design iconography and original name.

== Exits ==
- Northeast: Calzada Ermita Iztapalapa, Col. Ampliación San Miguel
- Southeast: Calzada Ermita Iztapalapa and. Av. San Lorenzo, Col. Ampliación San Miguel
- Northwest: Calzada Ermita Iztapalapa, Col. Ampliación San Miguel
- Southwest: Av. San Lorenzo and Calzada Ermita Iztapalapa, Col. Ampliación San Miguel

== Ridership ==
Annual passenger ridership
| Year | Ridership | Average daily | Rank | % change | Ref. |
|---|---|---|---|---|---|
| 2025 | 7,589,526 | 20,793 | 53/195 | −4.47% |
| 2024 | 7,944,244 | 21,705 | 44/195 | −8.35% |
| 2023 | 8,668,415 | 23,749 | 34/195 | +6.62% |
| 2022 | 8,129,921 | 22,273 | 33/195 | +54.72% |
| 2021 | 5,254,770 | 14,396 | 47/195 | −0.50% |
| 2020 | 5,281,337 | 14,429 | 56/195 | −42.62% |
| 2019 | 9,203,724 | 25,215 | 55/195 | −2.16% |
| 2018 | 9,406,548 | 25,771 | 55/195 | +6.33% |
| 2017 | 8,846,453 | 24,236 | 58/195 | +0.57% |
| 2016 | 8,796,002 | 24,032 | 62/195 | −3.48% |
