= Iztacalco metro station =

Mexico City metro station

Iztacalco
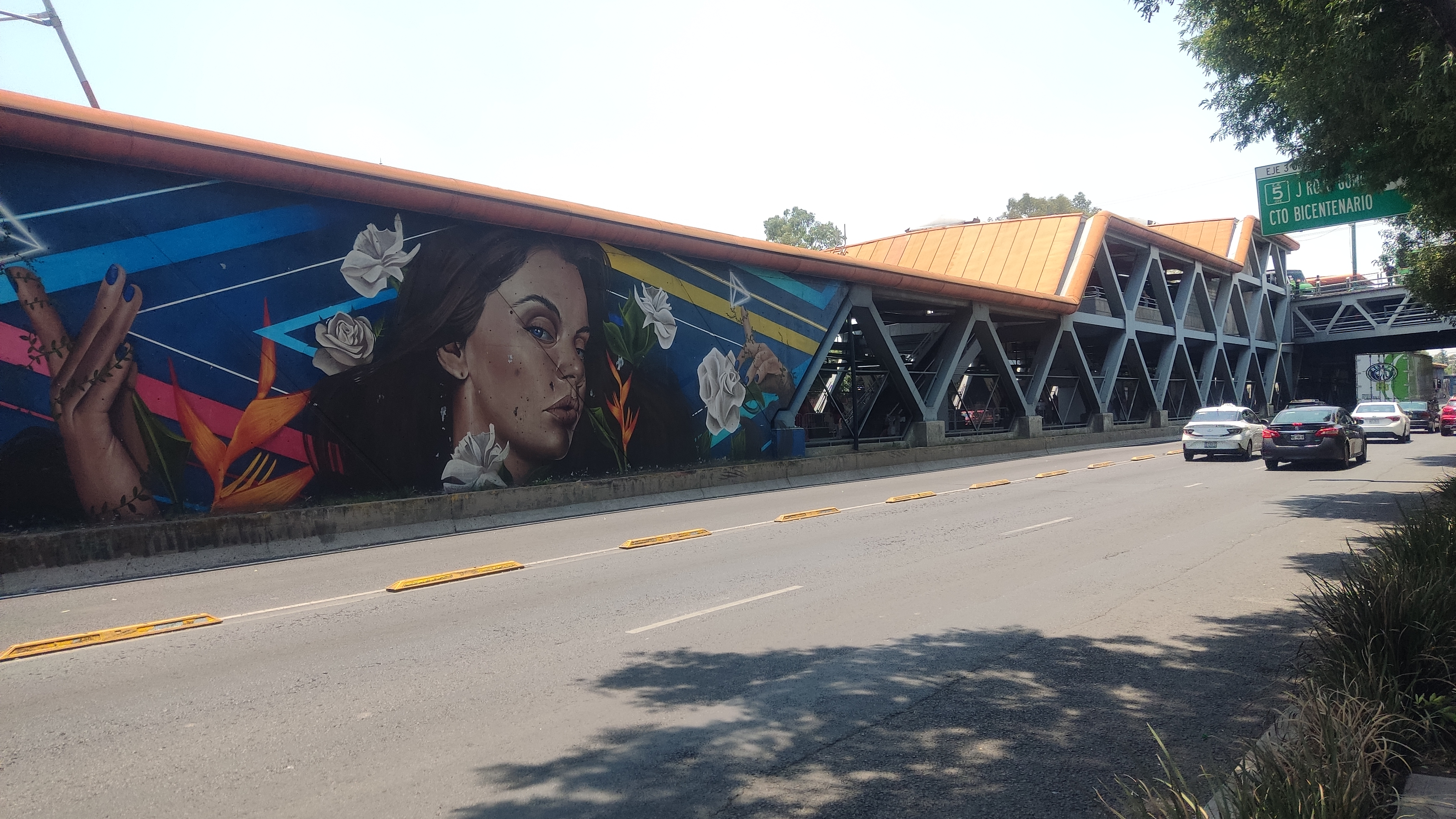

General information
- Coordinates: 19.388562°N 99.112215°W
- System: Mexico City Metro
- Platforms: 1 island platform
- Tracks: 2

Construction
- Structure type: At grade

History
- Opened: 20 July 1994

Passengers
- 2025: 5,544,801 (Note: The data here is limited to the most recent ten years to avoid excessive listings; earlier figures can be found in this page's history or on the Mexico City Metro website. To calculate the average daily ridership, the annual total is divided by 365 days (366 in leap years), with decimals omitted from the result. Each station per line is ranked individually, as the system counts transfer stations separately. The percentage change is calculated automatically using the data from the current year and the previous year.) ▼9.84%
- Rank: 89/195

Services
Preceding station	Mexico City Metro	Following station
Coyuya toward Garibaldi / Lagunilla	Line 8	Apatlaco toward Constitución de 1917
Route map
Location
- Location within Mexico City
- Area map

Iztacalco is a station along Line 8 of the Mexico City Metro.

Iztacalco is in the borough of the same name, in Mexico City. Its logo represents the monastery of San Matías, the first church on Calzada de la Viga. The Nahuatl toponym Iztacalco means "in the house of salt". The station was opened on 20 July 1994.

Like the other stations on this stretch of Line 8, Iztacalco stands on Avenida Francisco del Paso y Troncoso (eje 3 Ote). It also connected with trolleybus line "M", which runs between INFONAVIT Iztacalco residential estate and Metro Villa de Cortés. This station is the closest to the Colegio de Bachilleres Plantel 3 "Iztacalco".

== Ridership ==
Annual passenger ridership
Year	Ridership	Average daily	Rank	% change	Ref.
2025	5,544,801	15,191	89/195	−9.84%
2024	6,150,238	16,803	69/195	+9.54%
2023	5,614,604	15,382	81/195	+2.83%
2022	5,460,060	14,959	76/195	+25.08%
2021	4,365,189	11,959	68/195	−2.00%
2020	4,454,330	12,170	78/195	−44.34%
2019	8,002,058	21,923	77/195	+1.04%
2018	7,919,352	21,696	79/195	+3.29%
2017	7,666,917	21,005	82/195	−3.55%
2016	7,949,025	21,718	81/195	+2.45%
