= Bellas Artes metro station (Mexico City) =

Mexico City metro station

Bellas Artes
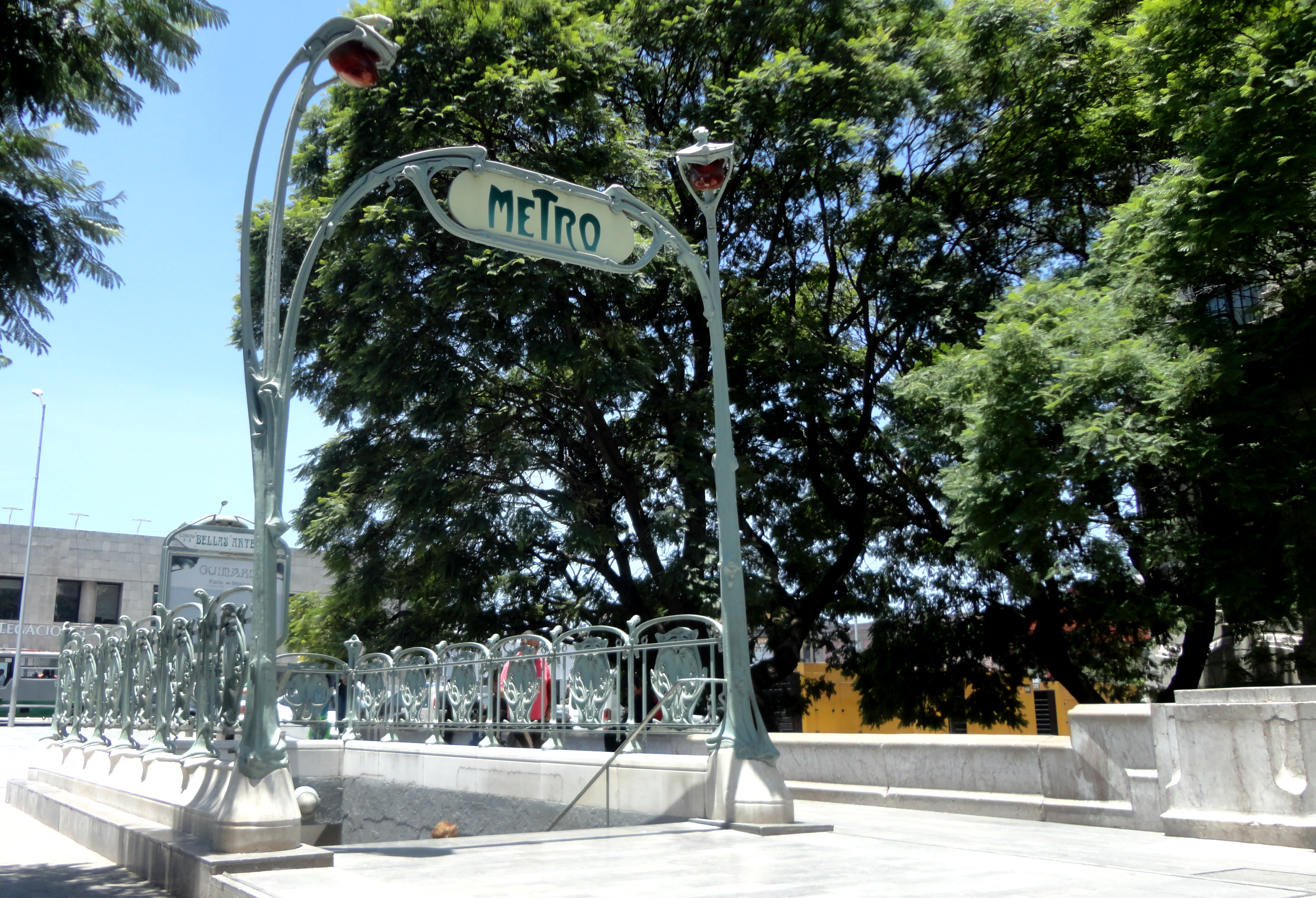
- The Guimard style entrance added in 1998.

General information
- Location: Centro, Cuauhtémoc; Mexico City; Mexico
- Coordinates: 19.436243°N 99.141955°W
- System: Mexico City Metro
- Platforms: 2 side platforms 2 side platforms; 1 island platform
- Tracks: 4
- Connections: Bellas Artes

Construction
- Structure type: Underground
- Parking: No
- Accessible: yes
- Architectural style: Art Nouveau

History
- Opened: 14 September 1970; 55 years ago 20 July 1994; 32 years ago

Passengers
- 2025: Total: 15,634,296; 9,469,480 (Note: The data here is limited to the most recent ten years to avoid excessive listings; earlier figures can be found in this page's history or on the Mexico City Metro website. To calculate the average daily ridership, the annual total is divided by 365 days (366 in leap years), with decimals omitted from the result. Each station per line is ranked individually, as the system counts transfer stations separately. The percentage change is calculated automatically using the data from the current year and the previous year.); 6,164,816 ▲12.61%
- Rank: 33/195; 74/195

Services
Preceding station	Mexico City Metro	Following station
Hidalgo toward Cuatro Caminos	Line 2	Allende toward Tasqueña
Garibaldi toward Garibaldi / Lagunilla	Line 8	San Juan de Letrán toward Constitución de 1917
Route map
Location
- Location within Mexico City
- Area map

Bellas Artes is a station along Line 2 and Line 8 of the Mexico City Metro system. It is located in the Colonia Centro neighborhood of the Delegación Cuauhtémoc municipality of Mexico City, on the junction of Avenida Juárez and Eje Central Lázaro Cárdenas, on the eastern end of Alameda Central, west of the city centre. In 2019, the station had an average ridership of 51,440 passengers per day.

== Name and pictogram ==
The station is named for the Palacio de Bellas Artes opera house and museum, opened in 1934 and located next to the station. The pictogram depicts a stylized version of the palace's Art Nouveau façade as seen from the main southern entrance.

== History ==
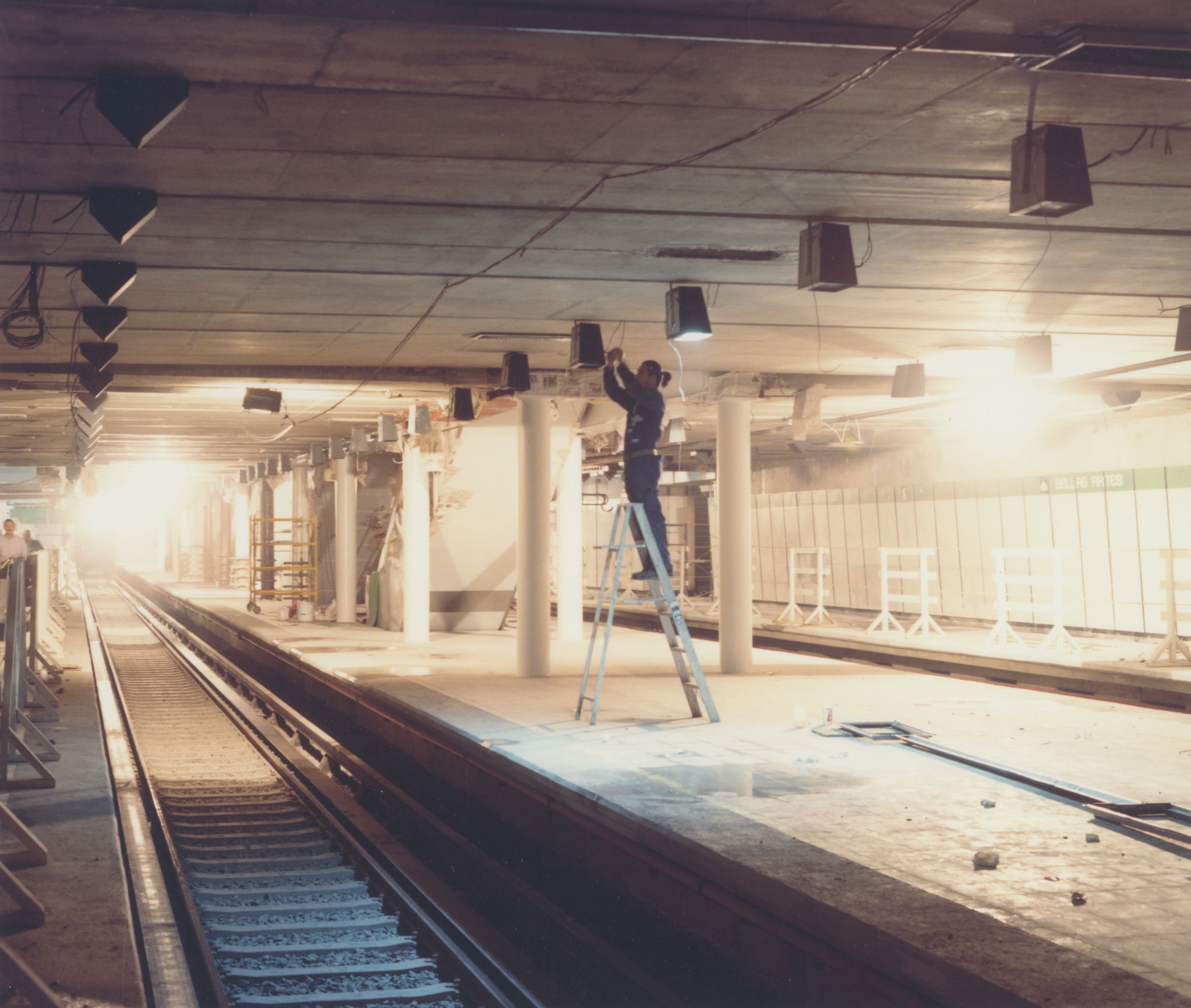
Line 8 platforms before its opening in 1994

The Line 2 section of the station was among the first to be opened in the system on 14 September 1970; the transfer with Line 8 was inaugurated on 20 July 1994.

French President Jacques Chirac inaugurated a treasured Hector Guimard style Art Nouveau Paris Métro entrance next to the western wing of the Palace on 14 November 1998. The entrance was a gift given in return for the mural El pensamiento y el alma huicholes by Huichol artist Santos de la Torre presented in 1997 to the Paris Métro that is now on display at the Palais Royal – Musée du Louvre station.

== General information ==
Inside the station, the platforms in Line 2 show reproductions of Mesoamerican art. Similarly, the Line 8 platforms are decorated with colourful murals, with Mexican and French motifs: a reproduction of one of the Bonampak murals by Rina Lazo; Visión francesa sobre México by Jean-Paul Chambas, and Visión de un artista mexicano sobre Francia by Rodolfo Morales.

As many stations in the Metro network, Bellas Artes has a cyber center, where users can access internet through a computer; the service is free and it is open from 8:00 to 20:00. From here, it is also possible to transfer to Metrobús Line 4 and Line A of the trolleybus service.

=== Ridership ===
Annual passenger ridership (Line 2)
Year	Ridership	Average daily	Rank	% change	Ref.
2025	9,469,480	25,943	33/195	+11.73%
2024	8,475,302	23,156	41/195	+19.34%
2023	7,101,787	19,456	53/195	−9.33%
2022	7,832,811	21,459	37/195	+81.94%
2021	4,305,045	11,794	70/195	−25.01%
2020	5,740,777	15,685	47/195	−48.08%
2019	11,057,441	30,294	41/195	−3.04%
2018	11,403,706	31,243	38/195	+0.54%
2017	11,342,493	31,075	39/195	−3.13%
2016	11,709,117	31,992	39/195	+3.35%

Annual passenger ridership (Line 8)
Year	Ridership	Average daily	Rank	% change	Ref.
2025	6,164,816	16,889	64/195	−6.83%
2024	6,616,541	16,843	61/195	+7.33%
2023	6,781,767	18,580	64/195	+7.50%
2022	6,308,862	17,284	54/195	+50.05%
2021	4,204,561	11,519	73/195	+10.89%
2020	3,791,644	10,359	97/195	−50.87%
2019	7,718,079	21,145	83/195	−2.75%
2018	7,936,353	21,743	77/195	−1.74%
2017	8,077,277	22,129	71/195	−3.81%
2016	8,396,784	22,942	75/195	+0.88%

== See also ==
- List of Mexico City metro stations
