= Mexico City Metro Line 8 =

Metro line in Mexico City

Line 8

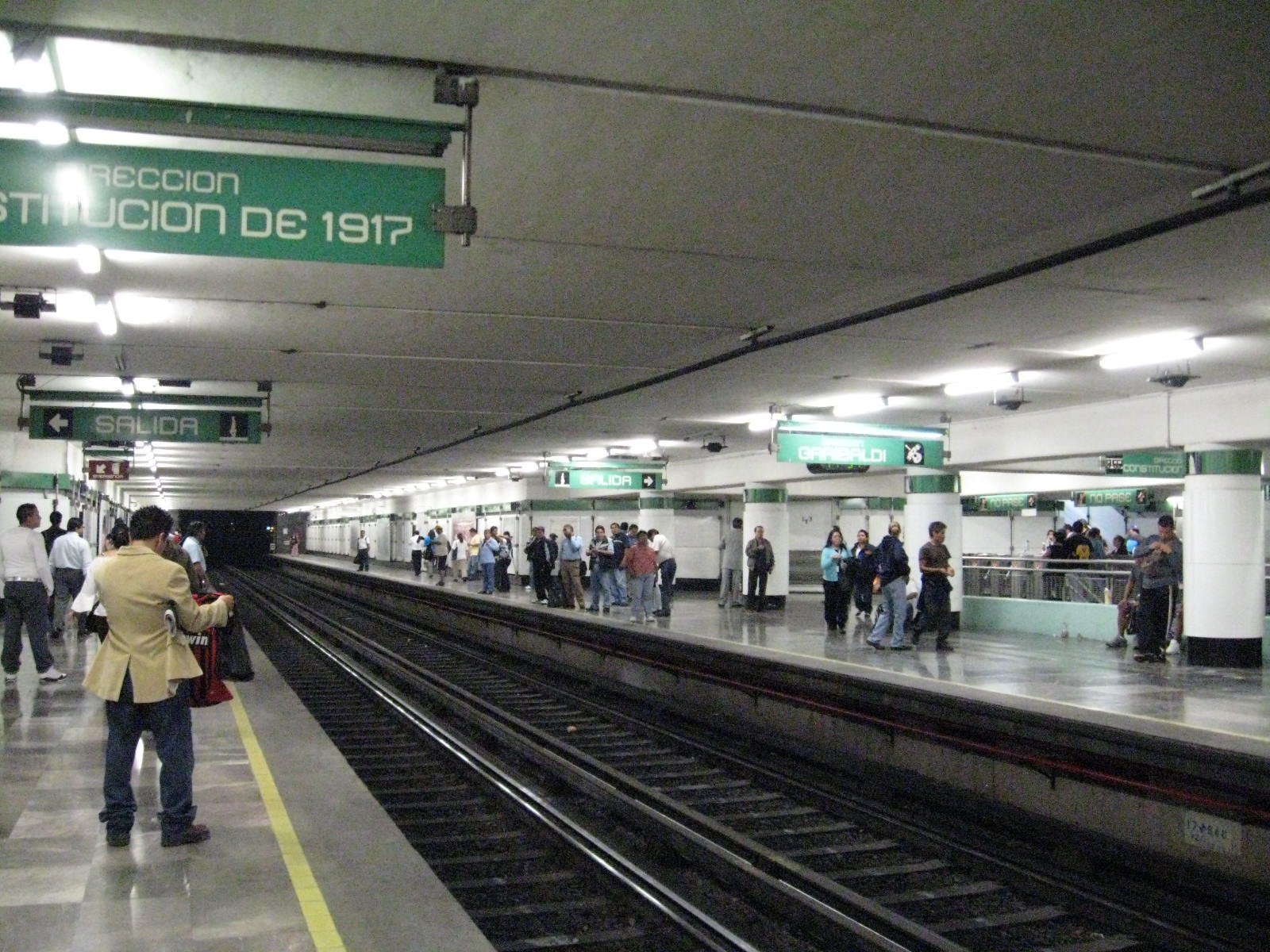
- San Juan de Letrán station

Overview
- Locale: Mexico City
- Termini: Garibaldi / Lagunilla; Constitución de 1917
- Connecting lines: at Garibaldi / Lagunilla; at Bellas Artes; at Salto del Agua; at Chabacano; at Santa Anita; at Atlalilco
- Stations: 19
- Website: metro.cdmx.gob.mx

Service
- Type: Rapid transit
- System: Mexico City Metro
- Operator(s): Sistema de Transporte Colectivo (STC)
- Rolling stock: NM-79, MP-82
- Ridership: 124,612,151 (2024)

History
- Opened: 20 July 1994; 31 years ago

Technical
- Line length: 17.679 km (11.0 mi)
- Track length: 20.078 km (12.5 mi)
- Number of tracks: 2
- Track gauge: 1,435 mm (4 ft 8 1/2 in) standard gauge with roll ways along track
- Electrification: Guide bar, 750 V DC
Route map
Line 8 route highlighted in gray

Mexico City Metro Line 8 is one of the twelve metro lines operating in Mexico City, Mexico. Its distinctive color is green.

Opened in 1994, it was the tenth line to be built (despite its name being Line 8). With a length of 20.078 kilometres (12.476 mi) and 19 stations, Line 8 runs through Mexico City from downtown to the southeastern municipality of Iztapalapa.

== History ==
Line 8 construction started in 1991 and finished in 1994. It was inaugurated on 20 July 1994 by President of Mexico Carlos Salinas de Gortari in its entire stretch going from Garibaldi to Constitución de 1917. The next day, Salinas de Gortari drove the first train.

In 2018, the Sistema de Transporte Colectivo presented its plan projected to 2030, where an expansion of Line 8 was announced. This would extend the line northbound to La Raza, where it would connect with Lines 3 and 5; and southbound to Santa Marta, where it would connect with Line A. The project states that seven new stations would be built: three northwards and four southwards, with a total of 10.21 km (6.34 mi) for a total track length of 27.89 km (17.33 mi).

== Rolling stock ==
Line 8 has had different types of rolling stock throughout the years.

- Alstom MP-82: 1994–present
- Concarril NM-79: 2008–present

Currently, out of the 390 trains in the Mexico City Metro network, 30 are in service in Line 8.

== Station list ==
Key (Note: The following list was adapted from different websites and official maps.: Metro connections obtained from the official Mexico City Metro system map.; Accessibility obtained from the Mexico City Metro system map. In some cases, the map omits the accessibility icon as the station(s) are actually partially accessible. However, the respective websites of each station on the official site indicate the respective accessibility methods. Stations with the symbol ‡ are fully accessible; stations with the symbol † are partially accessible.; Cablebús obtained from their official website.; Centro de transferencia modal (CETRAM;) obtained from the official website of the Órgano Regulador de Transporte.; Ecobici obtained from their official website.; Metrobús obtained from the Mexico City Metrobús system map.; Mexibús obtained from the official Mexico City Metro system map.; Mexicable obtained from the official Mexico City Metro system map.; Public buses network (peseros) obtained from the official website of the Órgano Regulador de Transporte.; Red de Transporte de Pasajeros obtained from their official website.; Trolleybuses obtained from their official website.)
Handicapped/disabled access	Fully accessible station	Cablebús Line {{{3}}}	Cablebús connection	Red de Transporte de Pasajeros	RTP connection
Handicapped/disabled access	Partially accessible station	Mexibús	Mexibús connection	Tren Interurbano	Tren Interurbano connection
Transfer hub	CETRAM transfer station	Mexicable	Mexicable connection	Tren Suburbano	Tren Suburbano connection
Transfer hub	ETRAM transfer station	Mexico City Metro	Mexico City Metro connection	Trolleybus	Trolleybus connection
Ecobici	Ecobici bikeshare	Mexico City minubus	Pesero connection	Xochimilco Light Rail	Xochimilco Light Rail connection

The stations from east to west:

Station	Handicapped/disabled access	Date opened	Level	Distance (km)		Connection	Location
Station	Handicapped/disabled access	Date opened	Level	Between stations	Total	Connection	Location
Garibaldi/Lagunilla	Handicapped/disabled access	July 20, 1994	Underground	—N/a	0.0	Line B; (at Luna), 18, 27A; 10E, 11C	Cuauhtémoc
Bellas Artes	Handicapped/disabled access	July 20, 1994	Underground	0.8	0.8	16A	Cuauhtémoc
San Juan de Letrán		July 20, 1994	Underground	0.6	1.4	(at Eje Central); (at República de Uruguay)	Cuauhtémoc
Salto del Agua	Handicapped/disabled access	July 20, 1994	Underground	0.4	1.8	19E, 19F, 19G, 19H	Cuauhtémoc
Doctores		July 20, 1994	Underground	0.7	2.5	Trolleybus Trolleybus Line 1	Cuauhtémoc
Obrera		July 20, 1994	Underground	0.9	3.4	, (at Eje Central); 19F (at distance)	Cuauhtémoc
Chabacano ‡		July 20, 1994	Underground	1.3	4.7	2A, 31B, 33, 111A, 145A; (at Jose Antonio Torres); 9C, 9E, 14A, 17C, 17H, 17I	Cuauhtémoc
La Viga		July 20, 1994	Underground	1.0	5.7	5A	Venustiano Carranza
Santa Anita		July 20, 1994	Underground	0.8	6.5	Line 4; 37; 5A, 14A	Iztacalco
Coyuya	Handicapped/disabled access	July 20, 1994	Grade-level	1.1	7.6	14A	Iztacalco
Iztacalco	Handicapped/disabled access	July 20, 1994	Grade-level	1.1	8.7	(at Colegio de Bachilleres 3)	Iztacalco
Apatlaco		July 20, 1994	Grade-level	1.1	9.8	(Sundays only)	Iztapalapa
Aculco		July 20, 1994	Grade-level	0.7	10.5	Mexico City Metrobús Mexico City Metrobús Line 5	Iztapalapa
Escuadrón 201		July 20, 1994	Underground	0.9	11.4	22D	Iztapalapa
Atlalilco	Handicapped/disabled access	July 20, 1994	Underground	1.9	13.3	Line 12; 1D, 52C; 6A	Iztapalapa
Iztapalapa		July 20, 1994	Underground	0.9	14.2	1D, 52C; 6A	Iztapalapa
Cerro de la Estrella		July 20, 1994	Underground	0.9	15.1	1D, 52C; 6A (at distance)	Iztapalapa
UAM-I		July 20, 1994	Underground	1.3	16.4	1D, 52C	Iztapalapa
Constitución de 1917	Handicapped/disabled access	July 20, 1994	Grade-level	1.3	17.7	1D, 47A, 57A, 57C, 159, 161, 161C, 161D, 161E, 161F, 162, 165A; 4B	Iztapalapa

== Ridership ==
The following table shows each of Line 8 stations total and average daily ridership during 2019.

†	Transfer station
‡	Terminal
†‡	Transfer station and terminal

Rank	Station	Total ridership	Average daily
1	Constitución de 1917‡	32,255,313	88,371
2	San Juan de Letrán	9,962,243	27,294
3	UAM-I	9,203,724	25,216
4	Coyuya	8,501,595	23,292
5	Escuadrón 201	8,047,639	22,048
6	Iztacalco	8,002,058	21,923
7	Bellas Artes†	7,718,079	21,145
8	Garibaldi / Lagunilla†‡	6,304,770	17,273
9	Atlalilco†	5,611,383	15,374
10	Salto del Agua†	5,454,216	14,943
11	Apatlaco	5,100,848	13,975
12	Doctores	4,502,133	12,335
13	Obrera	4,452,999	12,200
14	Iztapalapa	4,140,807	11,345
15	Cerro de la Estrella	4,074,999	11,164
16	Aculco	3,524,731	9,657
17	La Viga	2,805,291	7,686
18	Santa Anita†	2,402,874	6,583
19	Chabacano†	1,554,977	4,260
Total		133,620,679	366,084

== Tourism ==
Line 8 passes near several places of interest:

- Plaza Garibaldi, a square known as Mexico City's home of mariachi music where mariachi bands can be found playing or soliciting gigs from visitors
- Palacio de Bellas Artes, Palace of Fine Arts, cultural center
- Historic center of Mexico City
- Torre Latinoamericana, a skyscraper in downtown Mexico City with an observation deck

== See also ==
- List of Mexico City Metro lines
