= Mexico City Metrobús Line 5 =

Bus route in Mexico City

Metrobús Line 5
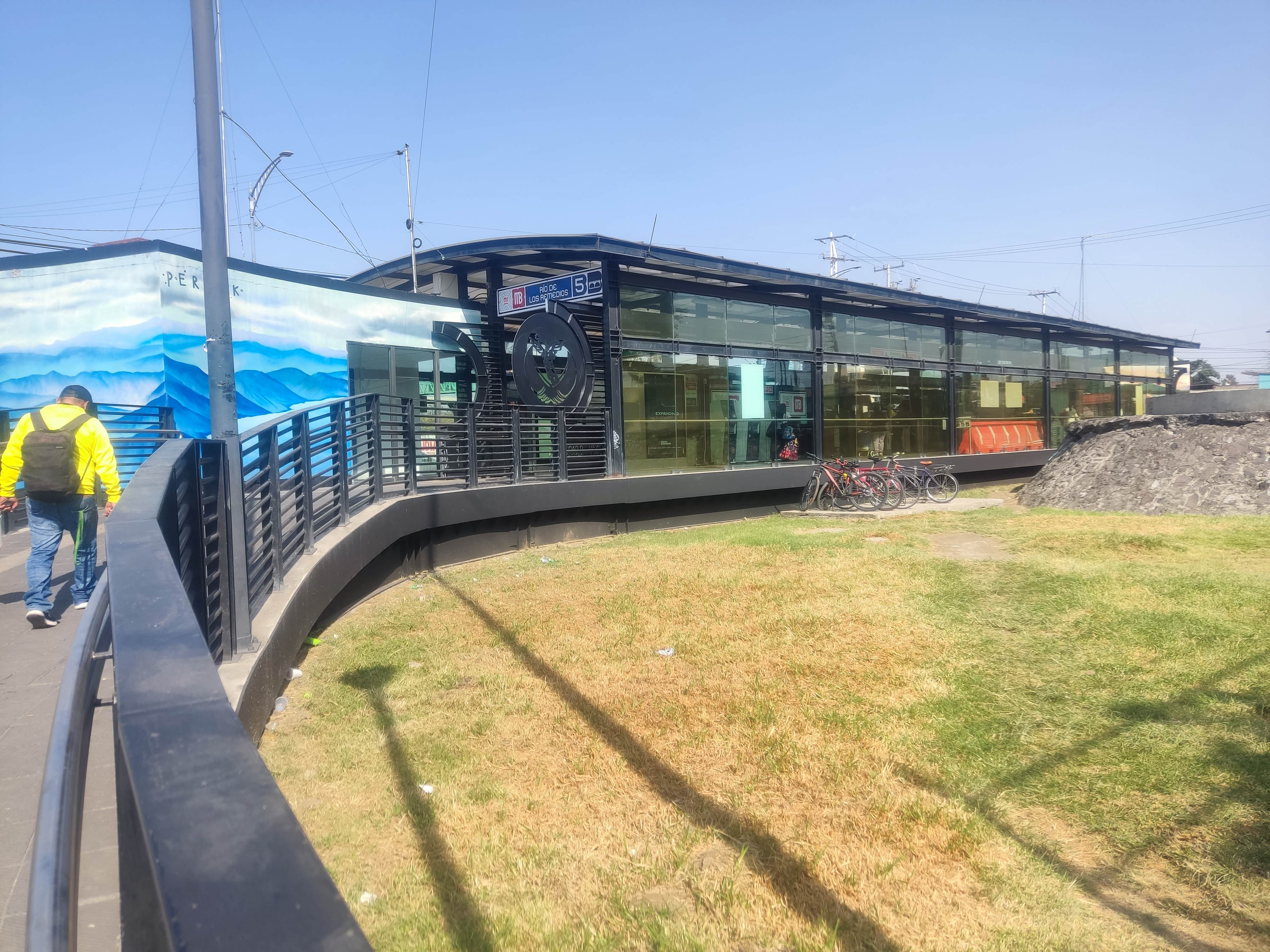
- Río de los Remedios station

Overview
- Status: In service
- Termini: Río de los Remedios; San Lázaro / Las Bombas / Preparatoria 1
- Stations: 51
- Website: Línea 5

Service
- Type: Bus rapid transit
- System: Mexico City Metrobus
- Services: 4
- Operator: See Operators
- Daily ridership: 70,000

History
- Opened: November 5, 2013; 12 years ago

Technical
- Line length: 28.5 km (17.7 mi)
- Character: Exclusive right-of-way

The Mexico City Metrobús Line 5 is a bus rapid transit line in the Mexico City Metrobus. It operates between Río de los Remedios in the boroughs of Gustavo A. Madero, in Mexico City's northern limit with the municipality of Ecatepec de Morelos in the State of Mexico, to Preparatoria 1 in Xochimilco.

Line 5 has a total of 51 stations and a length of 28.5 kilometers, which runs from northeastern to eastern Mexico City.

== History and construction ==
Construction of Line 5 started on March 26, 2013 and it was inaugurated on November 5, 2013 by Miguel Ángel Mancera, then-Head of Government of the Federal District. The service ran from Río de los Remedios to San Lázaro.

Expansion works for Line 5 started in August 2017. It was planned to extend the line until Preparatoria 1, although originally intended to be extended to Glorieta de Vaqueritos in the limits of Tlalpan and Xochimilco boroughs), in southeastern Mexico City. The first extension added 26 stations along 16 kilometers. The second extension added 4 kilometers and 7 stations to the line, serving the Coyoacán, Tlalpan, and Xochimilco boroughs.

== Service description ==
=== Services ===
The line has three itineraries.

Río de los Remedios to San Lázaro Norte

To San Lázaro Norte
- First Bus: 4:32 (Monday-Friday)
- Last Bus: 21:29 (Monday-Friday)
- First Bus: 4:30 (Saturday)
- Last Bus: 23:40 (Saturday)
- First Bus: 5:00 (Sunday)
- Last Bus: 23:40 (Sunday)

To Río de los Remedios
- First Bus: 4:39 (Monday-Friday)
- Last Bus: 22:21 (Monday-Friday)
- First Bus: 4:32 (Saturday)
- Last Bus: 00:11 (Saturday)
- First Bus: 5:09 (Sunday)
- Last Bus: 00:11 (Sunday)

Las Bombas to San Lázaro Sur

To San Lázaro Sur
- First Bus: 4:30 (Monday-Friday)
- Last Bus: 21:57 (Monday-Friday)

To Las Bombas
- First Bus: 4:32 (Monday-Friday)
- Last Bus: 21:12 (Monday-Friday)

Río de los Remedios to Las Bombas

To Las Bombas
- First Bus: 4:30 (Monday-Friday)
- Last Bus: 00:07 (Monday-Friday)

To Río de los Remedios
- First Bus: 4:36 (Monday-Friday)
- Last Bus: 00:02 (Monday-Friday)

Line 5 services the Gustavo A. Madero, Venustiano Carranza, Iztacalco, Iztapalapa and Coyoacán, Tlalpan and Xochimilco boroughs.

=== Station list ===
Key (Note: The following list was adapted from different websites and official maps.: Metro connections obtained from the official Mexico City Metro system map.; Accessibility obtained from the Mexico City Metro system map. In some cases, the map omits the accessibility icon as the station(s) are actually partially accessible. However, the respective websites of each station on the official site indicate the respective accessibility methods. Stations with the symbol are fully accessible; stations with the symbol are partially accessible.; Cablebús obtained from their official website.; Centro de transferencia modal (CETRAM;) obtained from the official website of the Órgano Regulador de Transporte.; Ecobici obtained from their official website.; Metrobús obtained from the Mexico City Metrobús system map.; Mexibús obtained from the official Mexico City Metro system map.; Mexicable obtained from the official Mexico City Metro system map.; Public buses network (peseros) obtained from the official website of the Órgano Regulador de Transporte.; Red de Transporte de Pasajeros obtained from their official website.; Trolleybuses obtained from their official website.)
Handicapped/disabled access	Fully accessible station	Cablebús Line {{{3}}}	Cablebús connection	Red de Transporte de Pasajeros	RTP connection
Handicapped/disabled access	Partially accessible station	Mexibús	Mexibús connection	Tren Interurbano	Tren Interurbano connection
Transfer hub	CETRAM transfer station	Mexicable	Mexicable connection	Tren Suburbano	Tren Suburbano connection
Transfer hub	ETRAM transfer station	Mexico City Metro	Mexico City Metro connection	Trolleybus	Trolleybus connection
Ecobici	Ecobici bikeshare	Mexico City minubus	Pesero connection	Xochimilco Light Rail	Xochimilco Light Rail connection

Station (Note: All the stations are fully accessible to people with disabilities.)	Connections	Neighborhood(s)	Borough	Picture	Date opened
Río de los Remedios	Mexibús Mexibús Line 2	Juan González Romero; Nueva Atzacoalco	Gustavo A. Madero		November 5, 2013
314. Memorial New's Divine		Del Obrero, Nueva Atzacoalco	Gustavo A. Madero		November 5, 2013
5 de Mayo		Vasco de Quiroga; Nueva Atzacoalco	Gustavo A. Madero		November 5, 2013
Vasco de Quiroga		Vasco de Quiroga; Nueva Atzacoalco	Gustavo A. Madero		November 5, 2013
El Coyol		Salvador Díaz Mirón; El Coyol	Gustavo A. Madero		November 5, 2013
Preparatoria 3		Constitución de la República; El Coyol	Gustavo A. Madero		November 5, 2013
San Juan de Aragón	(at Gran Canal)	Constitución de la República; DM Nacional	Gustavo A. Madero		November 5, 2013
Río de Guadalupe		Granjas Modernas, DM Nacional	Gustavo A. Madero		November 5, 2013
Talismán	15C	Ampliación San Juan de Aragón; San Pedro el Chico	Gustavo A. Madero		November 5, 2013
Victoria		Aragón Inguarán; Gertrudis Sánchez	Gustavo A. Madero		November 5, 2013
Oriente 101	(at Av. Eduardo Molina); 11A, 12	Ampliación Mártires de Río Blanco; Gertrudis Sánchez	Gustavo A. Madero		November 5, 2013
Río Santa Coleta		La Joya; Nueva Tenochitlán	Gustavo A. Madero		November 5, 2013
Río Consulado	37, 200; 5A, 20A, 20B	La Joya; La Malinche	Gustavo A. Madero		November 5, 2013
Canal del Norte	20B	Ampliación Michoacana; 20 de Noviembre	Venustiano Carranza		November 5, 2013
Deportivo Eduardo Molina		Ampliación 20 de Noviembre; 20 de Noviembre	Venustiano Carranza		November 5, 2013
Mercado Morelos	18	20 de Noviembre; Col. Morelos	Venustiano Carranza		November 5, 2013
Archivo General de la Nación	Mexico City Metrobús Mexico City Metrobús Line 4	Ampliación Penitenciaria; Penitenciaria	Venustiano Carranza		November 5, 2013
San Lázaro	East Bus Terminal (TAPO)	Del Parque; 7 de Julio	Venustiano Carranza		November 5, 2013
Moctezuma	19E, 19F, 19G, 19H (all at distance)	Del Parque; Jardín Balbuena	Venustiano Carranza		September 7, 2020
Venustiano Carranza	19F, 19H	Jardín Balbuena	Venustiano Carranza		September 7, 2020
Avenida del Taller	19F	24 de Abril	Venustiano Carranza		September 7, 2020
Mixiuhca	9C, 9E, 14A	Magdalena Mixiuhca	Venustiano Carranza		September 7, 2020
Hospital General Troncoso		Granjas México	Iztacalco		September 7, 2020
Metro Coyuya	14A	Granjas México; Tlazintla; Coyuya; Barrio de los Reyes	Iztacalco		September 7, 2020
Recreo		Tlazintla	Iztacalco		September 7, 2020
Oriente 116		Los Picos de Iztacalco II A	Iztacalco		September 7, 2020
Colegio de Bachilleres 3		INFONAVIT Iztacalco	Iztacalco		September 7, 2020
Canal de Apatlaco		Apatlaco	Iztapalapa		September 7, 2020
Apatlaco	(Sundays only)	Purísima Atlazolpa; Pueblo Magdalena Atlazolpa; Purísima Atlazolpa; Nueva Rosita	Iztapalapa		September 7, 2020
Aculco	Mexico City Metro Line 8	Pueblo Magdalena Atlazolpa; Pueblo Aculco; Jardines de Churubusco	Iztapalapa		September 7, 2020
Churubusco Oriente		El Sifón	Iztapalapa		September 7, 2020
Escuadrón 201	22D	Escuadrón 201	Iztapalapa		September 7, 2020
Atanasio G. Sarabia	22D	Escuadrón 201	Iztapalapa		September 7, 2020
Ermita Iztapalapa	52C; 22D	Progreso del Sur	Iztapalapa		September 7, 2020
Ganaderos		Progreso del Sur; Minerva	Iztapalapa		September 7, 2020
Pueblo Los Reyes		Valle del Sur; Pueblo Los Reyes Culhuacán	Iztapalapa		September 7, 2020
Barrio San Antonio		Barrio San Antonio Culhuacán	Iztapalapa		September 7, 2020
Calzada Taxqueña		Barrio Tula	Iztapalapa		September 7, 2020
Cafetales		San Francisco Culhuacán	Coyoacán		September 7, 2020
ESIME Culhuacán		CTM Culhuacán V	Coyoacán		September 7, 2020
Manuela Sáenz		CTM Culhuacán VI	Coyoacán		September 7, 2020
La Vírgen	37	Ex Ejido de San Pedro Tepetlapa; Popular Emiliano Zapata	Coyoacán		September 7, 2020
Tepetlapa		Alianza Popular Revolucionaria; Popular Emiliano Zapata	Coyoacán		September 7, 2020
Las Bombas		CTM Culhuacán X; Cafetales	Coyoacán		September 7, 2020
Vista Hermosa		Hacienda de Coyoacán; CTM Culhuacán X	Coyoacán		May 3, 2021
Calzada del Hueso		Hacienda de Coyoacán	Coyoacán		May 3, 2021
Cañaverales		Granjas Coapa	Tlalpan		May 3, 2021
Muyuguarda		San Lorenzo la Cebada	Xochimilco		May 3, 2021
Circuito Cuemanco		Barrio 18	Xochimilco		May 3, 2021
DIF Xochimilco		Barrio 18	Xochimilco		May 3, 2021
Preparatoria 1	47A, 81A, 143	Potrero de San Bernardino	Xochimilco		May 3, 2021

== Operators ==
Line 5 has the following operators.

- Corredor Integral de Transporte Eduardo Molina, SA (CITEMSA)
- Red de Transporte de Pasajeros del Distrito Federal (RTP)

== Incidents ==
A week before its opening, on September 1, 2020, a truck crashed into Hospital General Troncoso station, damaging the roof.
