= Constitución de 1917 metro station =

Mexico City metro station

Constitución de 1917
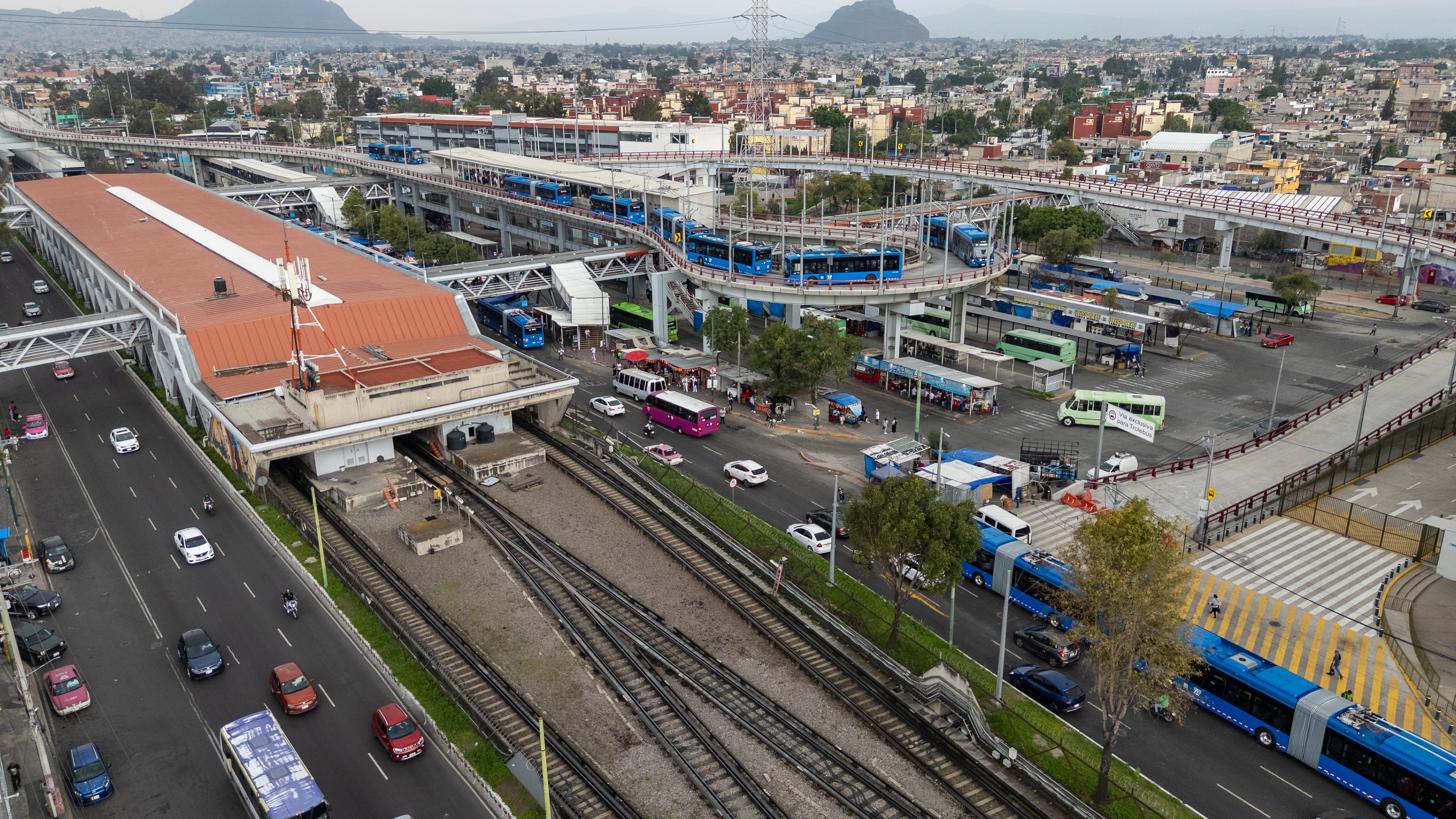
- The metro station along Calzada Ermita Iztapalapa

General information
- Location: Mexico
- Coordinates: 19.34593°N 99.063892°W
- System: Mexico City Metro
- Operator: Sistema de Transporte Colectivo (STC)
- Platforms: 2 island platforms
- Tracks: 3
- Connections: Constitución de 1917

Construction
- Structure type: At grade

Other information
- Status: In service

History
- Opened: 20 July 1994

Passengers
- 2025: 33,195,227 (Note: The data here is limited to the most recent ten years to avoid excessive listings; earlier figures can be found in this page's history or on the Mexico City Metro website. To calculate the average daily ridership, the annual total is divided by 365 days (366 in leap years), with decimals omitted from the result. Each station per line is ranked individually, as the system counts transfer stations separately. The percentage change is calculated automatically using the data from the current year and the previous year.) ▼4.79%
- Rank: 2/195

Services
Preceding station	Mexico City Metro	Following station
UAM-I toward Garibaldi / Lagunilla	Line 8	Terminus
Route map
Location
- Location within Mexico City
- Area map

Constitución de 1917 is a terminal station at the southeastern end of line 8 of the Mexico City Metro in Mexico City, Mexico. In 2019, the station had an average ridership of 100,043 passengers per day, making it the fourth busiest station in the network.

The logo of the station depicts a quill above a document dated 1917 and is intended to represent the Constitution of Mexico, which was adopted 5 February 1917. The station was opened on 20 July 1994.

== Ridership ==
Annual passenger ridership
Year	Ridership	Average daily	Rank	% change	Ref.
2025	33,195,227	90,945	2/195	−4.79%
2024	34,866,831	95,264	1/195	+0.38%
2023	34,735,665	95,166	1/195	+69.44%
2022	29,884,202	81,874	2/195	+45.77%
2021	20,500,309	56,165	5/195	+11.85%
2020	18,327,884	50,076	6/195	−43.18%
2019	32,255,313	88,370	6/195	+1.08%
2018	31,911,394	87,428	5/195	+3.62%
2017	30,795,626	84,371	6/195	−7.44%
2016	33,271,713	90,906	6/195	−6.55%
