= Garibaldi/Lagunilla metro station =

Mexico City metro station

Garibaldi/Lagunilla
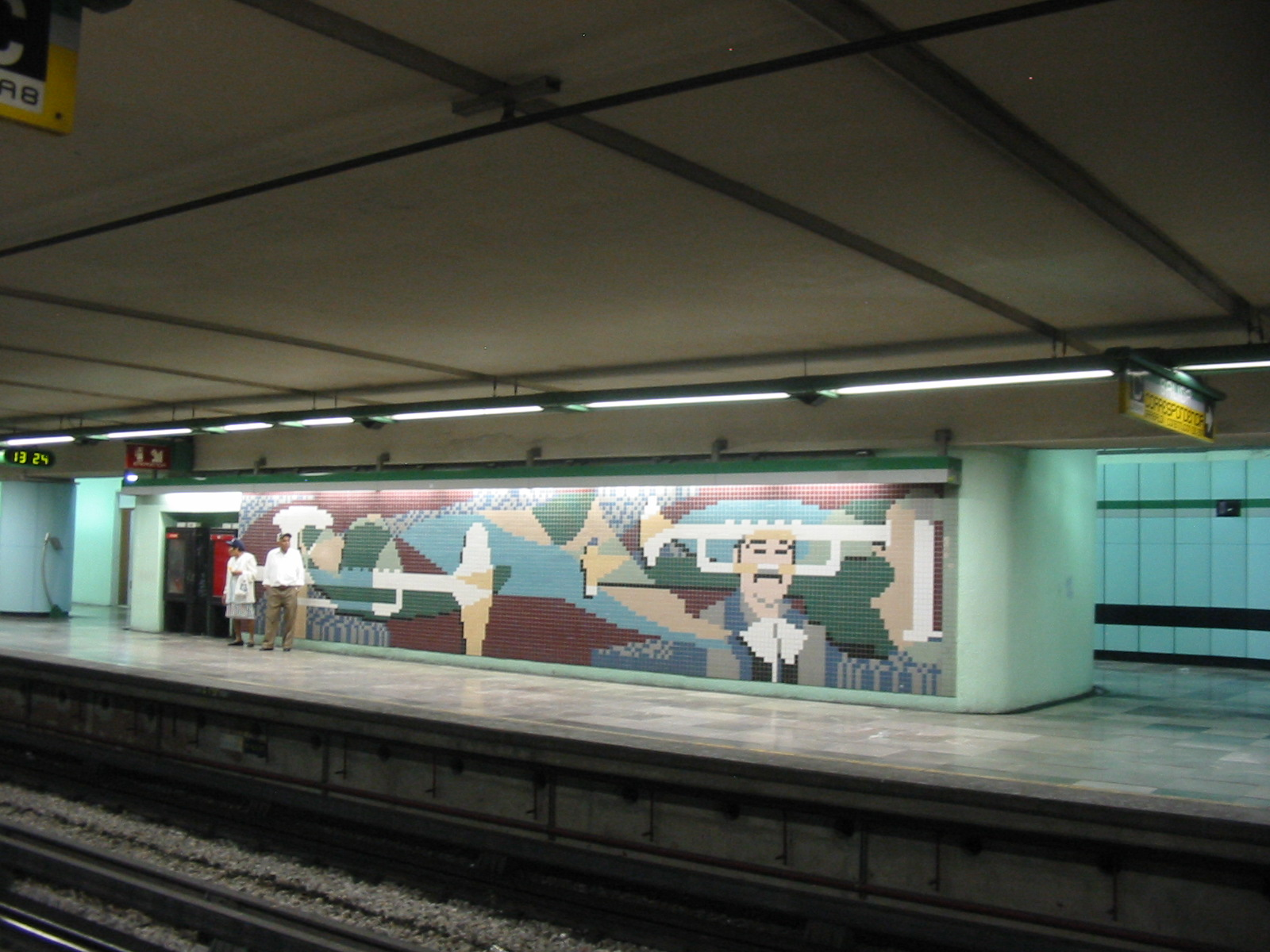
- Tilework at the station.

General information
- Location: Mexico
- Coordinates: 19.4445°N 99.1397°W
- System: Mexico City Metro
- Platforms: 2 side platforms; 1 island platform 2 side platforms
- Tracks: 4
- Connections: Garibaldi Mercado Lagunilla

Construction
- Structure type: Underground

History
- Opened: 20 July 1994; 15 December 1999
- Former names: Garibaldi

Passengers
- 2025: Total: 8,291,657; 5,985,794 (Note: The data here is limited to the most recent ten years to avoid excessive listings; earlier figures can be found in this page's history or on the Mexico City Metro website. To calculate the average daily ridership, the annual total is divided by 365 days (366 in leap years), with decimals omitted from the result. Each station per line is ranked individually, as the system counts transfer stations separately. The percentage change is calculated automatically using the data from the current year and the previous year.); 2,305,863 ▼9.96%
- Rank: 77/195; 166/195

Services
Preceding station	Mexico City Metro	Following station
Terminus	Line 8	Bellas Artes toward Constitución de 1917
Lagunilla toward Ciudad Azteca	Line B	Guerrero toward Buenavista
Route map
Location
- Location within Mexico City
- Area map

Garibaldi/Lagunilla (formerly Garibaldi) is a station on the Mexico City Metro. It is a transfer station, serving both Lines 8 and B. It is the northern terminus of Line 8.

== Name and pictogram ==
The station's logo depicts a guitar and a sarape. Plaza Garibaldi is a large square near the metro station which was named in honor of Giuseppe Garibaldi II, the grandson of Italian hero Giuseppe Garibaldi. The square is famous for the many groups of Mariachi musicians who gather there and for the large numbers of visitors who come to eat, drink, and listen to music in the nearby cantinas.

== General information ==
Garibaldi is located on the northern fringes of Mexico City's historical downtown district or Centro, it also serves Colonia Guerrero, and Colonia Morelos.

Garibaldi's Line 8 platform first opened to passengers in July 1994 and the Line B connection started in December 1999.

In May 2017 a permanent exposition about Mexican boxing idols was inaugurated in the station. This included murals and photographies of prominent Mexican boxers such as Raúl Macías, Julio César Chávez, Mariana Juárez, Marco Antonio Barrera, Pipino Cuevas and Saúl Álvarez.

=== Ridership ===
Annual passenger ridership (Line 8)
Year	Ridership	Average daily	Rank	% change	Ref.
2025	5,985,794	16,399	77/195	−14.34%
2024	6,987,952	19,092	54/195	+2.48%
2023	6,818,805	18,681	61/195	+24.77%
2022	5,465,055	14,972	75/195	+58.89%
2021	3,439,579	9,423	89/195	−6.69%
2020	3,686,006	10,071	101/195	−41.54%
2019	6,304,770	17,273	107/195	+1.33%
2018	6,222,033	17,046	107/195	−4.40%
2017	6,508,152	17,830	98/195	−3.30%
2016	6,730,025	18,388	98/195	−5.75%

Annual passenger ridership (Line B)
Year	Ridership	Average daily	Rank	% change	Ref.
2025	2,305,863	6,317	166/195	−1.07%
2024	2,330,712	6,368	159/195	−2.48%
2023	2,389,968	6,547	146/195	+8.07%
2022	2,211,440	6,058	146/195	+62.16%
2021	1,363,736	3,736	160/195	−7.73%
2020	1,477,917	4,038	169/195	−45.46%
2019	2,709,631	7,423	173/195	+0.56%
2018	2,694,474	7,382	172/195	+13.70%
2017	2,369,784	6,492	175/195	−13.39%
2016	2,736,070	7,475	170/195	−9.43%

== Gallery ==
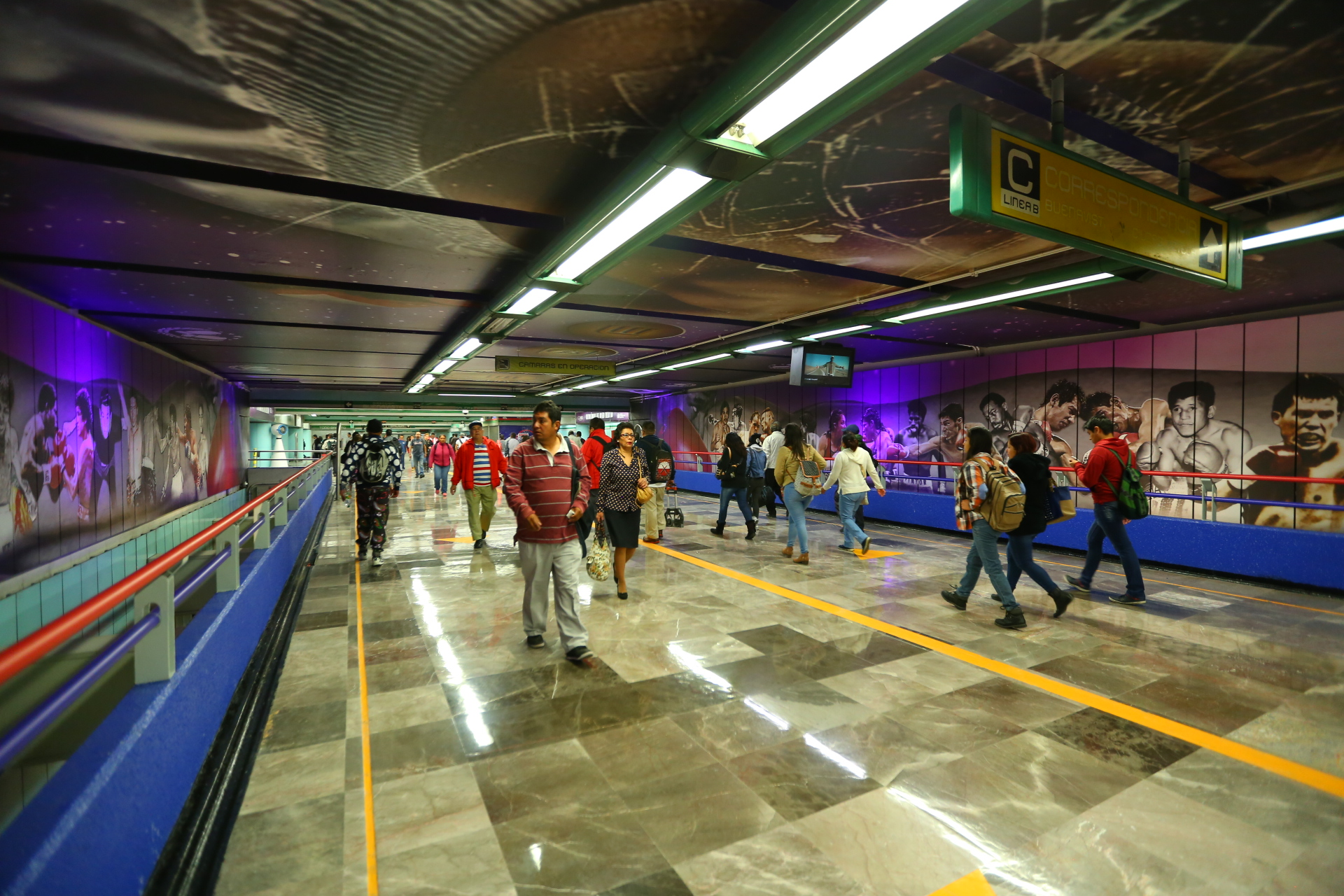
Station decorated with murals of several prominent Mexican boxers
