= Guelatao metro station =

Mexico City Metro station

Guelatao
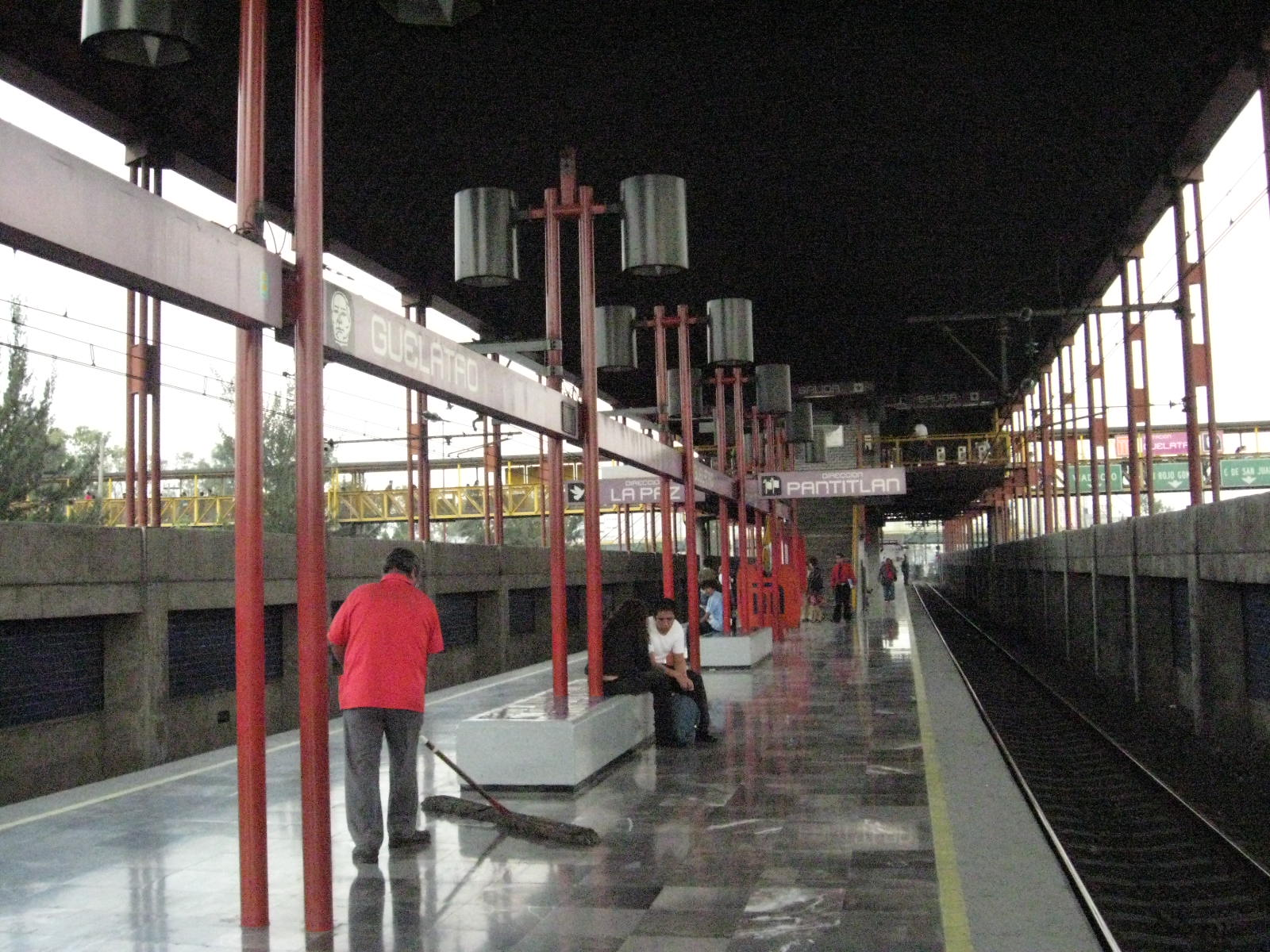
- Station platform, 2008

General information
- Location: Calzada Ignacio Zaragoza; Iztapalapa, Mexico City; Mexico
- Coordinates: 19.385162°N 99.03574°W
- System: Mexico City Metro
- Owner: Government of Mexico City
- Operator: Sistema de Transporte Colectivo (STC)
- Platforms: 1 island platform
- Tracks: 2
- Connections: Routes: 162-B, 163, 163-A, 163-B, 164, 166, 167; Route: 9-D

Construction
- Structure type: At grade

Other information
- Status: In service

History
- Opened: 12 August 1991; 35 years ago

Passengers
- 2025: 6,270,222 (Note: The system's website counts only passenger entries into stations and does not include passengers passing through, transferring between lines, or exiting the station. The data here is limited to the most recent ten years to avoid excessive listings; earlier figures can be found in this page's history or on the Mexico City Metro website. To calculate the average daily ridership, the annual total is divided by 365 days (366 in leap years), with decimals omitted from the result. Each station per line is ranked individually, as the system counts transfer stations separately. The percentage change is calculated automatically using the data from the current year and the previous year.) ▲2.65%
- Rank: 72/195

Services
Preceding station	Mexico City Metro	Following station
Tepalcates toward Pantitlán	Line A	Peñón Viejo toward La Paz
Route map
Location
- Location within Mexico City
- Area map and layout

Guelatao metro station (Note: Estación del Metro Guelatao. Spanish pronunciation: [ge.la'tao]. The etymology comes from the Zapotec language, "Enchanted lagoon".) is a Mexico City Metro station in the city's borough of Iztapalapa. It is an at-grade stop that serves Line A (Purple Line) between Tepalcates and Peñón Viejo, servicing the Colonias (neighborhoods) of Ejército de Oriente and Voceadores. The station provides access to the Facultad de Estudios Superiores (FES) Zaragoza of the National Autonomous University of Mexico (UNAM).

Guelatao metro station is named after the town of San Pablo Guelatao, Oaxaca, where Benito Juárez, the 26th president of Mexico, was born. Its pictogram depicts the sculpture on top of the Museo Cabeza de Juárez, found near the station. The stop opened on 12 August 1991 providing service northwest toward Pantitlán and southeast toward La Paz. In 2025, the station had an average daily entrance of 17,178 passengers.

== Location and layout ==
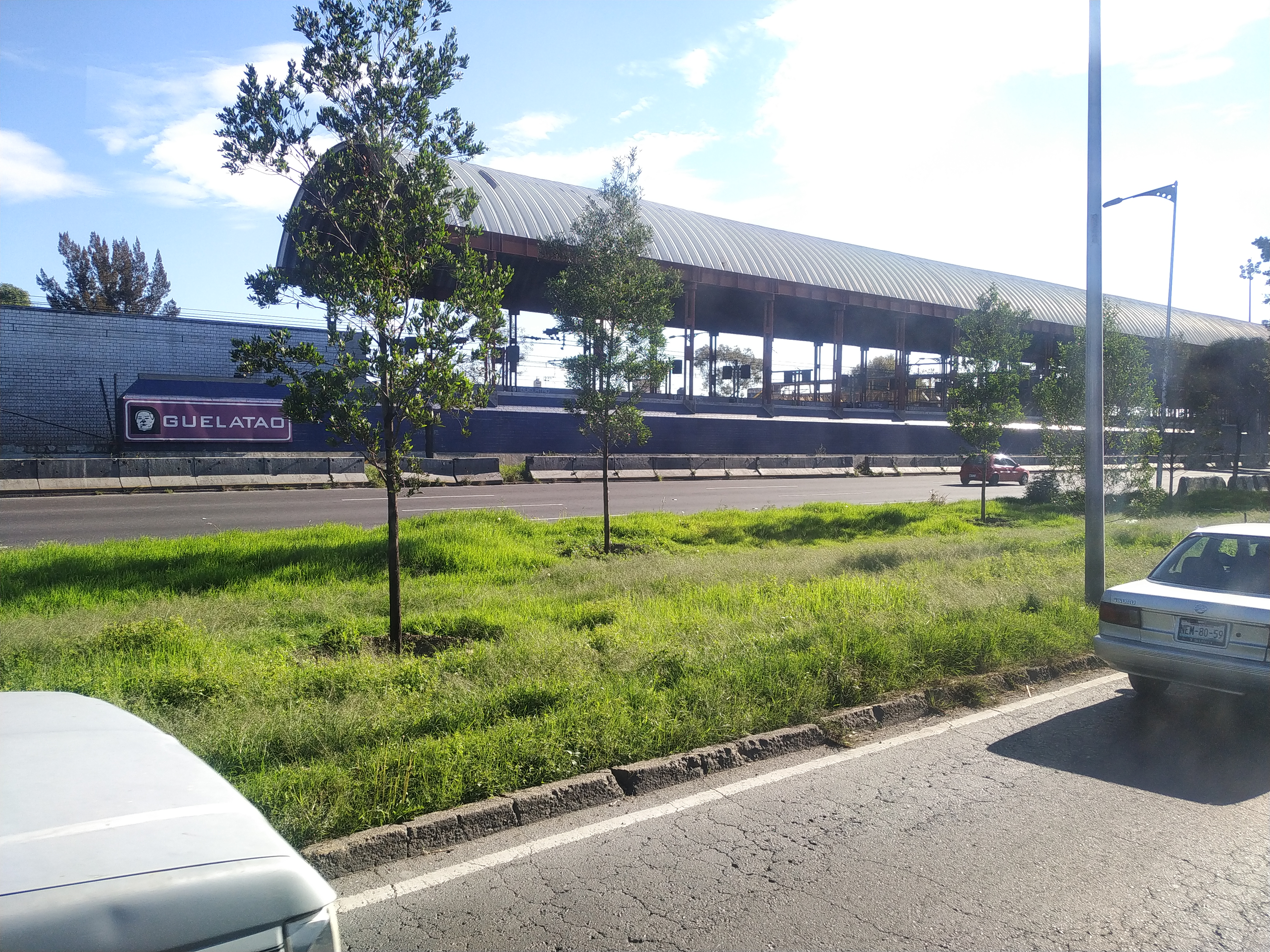
The station's exterior in 2018

Guelatao is an at-grade metro station along Calzada Ignacio Zaragoza, in Colonias (neighborhoods) of Ejército de Oriente and Voceadores, in Iztapalapa, eastern Mexico City.

Guelatao metro station has two exits along Calzada Ignacio Zaragoza. The northern exit is at the corner of Calle General Miguel Lira y Ortega in Colonia Voceadores and the southern one is at Calle Batallón de la Zacapoaxtla in Colonia Ejército de Oriente. The station provides access to the Facultad de Estudios Superiores (FES) Zaragoza of the National Autonomous University of Mexico (UNAM).

The station is located between Tepalcates and Peñón Viejo stations on the line. The area is serviced by Route 9-D of the city's public bus system and by Routes 162-B, 163, 163-A, 163-B, 164, 166, and 167 of the Red de Transporte de Pasajeros network.

== History and construction ==
Line A of the Mexico City Metro was built by Empresas ICA. The line was opened on 12 August 1991, operating from Pantitlán to La Paz, located in the municipality of the same name of the State of Mexico. The stretch between Guelatao and Tepalcates spans 1,161 meters (3,809 ft), while the segment toward Peñón Viejo measures 2,206 meters (7,238 ft), the longest interstation section of the system.

=== Name and pictogram ===
The station's pictogram features the silhouette of the sculpture atop the nearby Cabeza de Juárez museum. The artwork depicts the head of Benito Juárez, who served as president of Mexico from 1858 to 1872. Juárez was born in the town of San Pablo Guelatao, in Guelatao Municipality, Oaxaca; the word guelatao means "enchanted lagoon" in Zapotec.

=== Incidents ===
The area that follows Guelatao, toward La Paz, floods frequently during heavy rain.

== Ridership ==
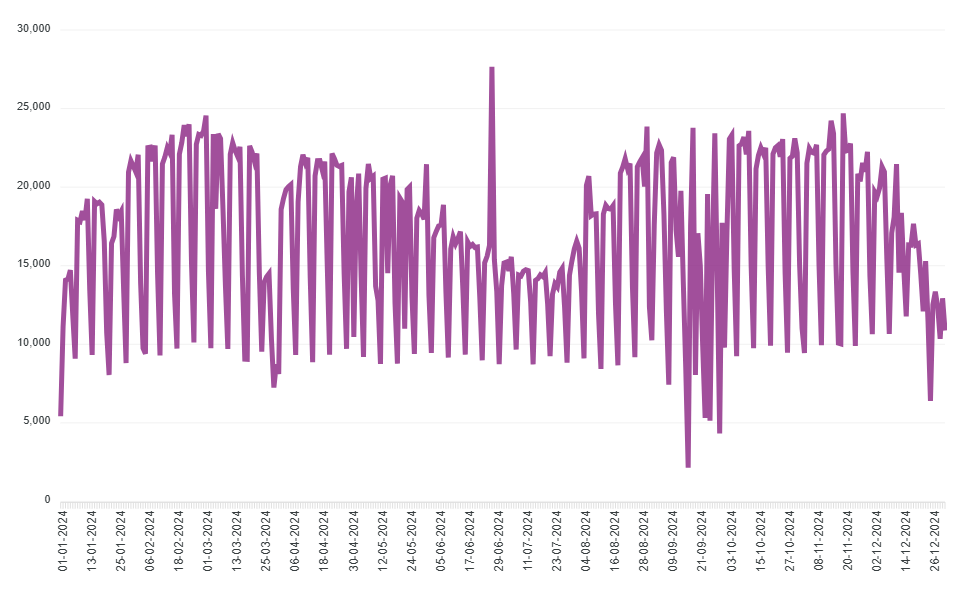
Daily ridership for Guelatao station in 2024

According to official data, before the impact of the COVID-19 pandemic, the station recorded between 10,500 and 21,700 average daily entries from 2016 to 2019. In 2025, it recorded 6,270,222 passenger entries, ranking 72nd among the system's 195 stations.

Annual passenger ridership
Year	Ridership	Average daily	Rank	% change	Ref.
2025	6,270,222	17,178	72/195	+2.65%	
2024	6,108,164	16,688	70/195	−10.21%	
2023	6,802,967	18,638	62/195	+31.07%	
2022	5,190,309	14,220	84/195	+35.14%	
2021	3,840,759	10,522	78/195	−1.11%	
2020	3,883,863	10,611	93/195	−50.83%	
2019	7,898,506	21,639	78/195	+15.27%	
2018	6,852,441	18,773	91/195	+5.93%	
2017	6,469,026	17,723	102/195	−5.37%	
2016	6,836,208	18,678	95/195	−17.35%	

== Gallery ==
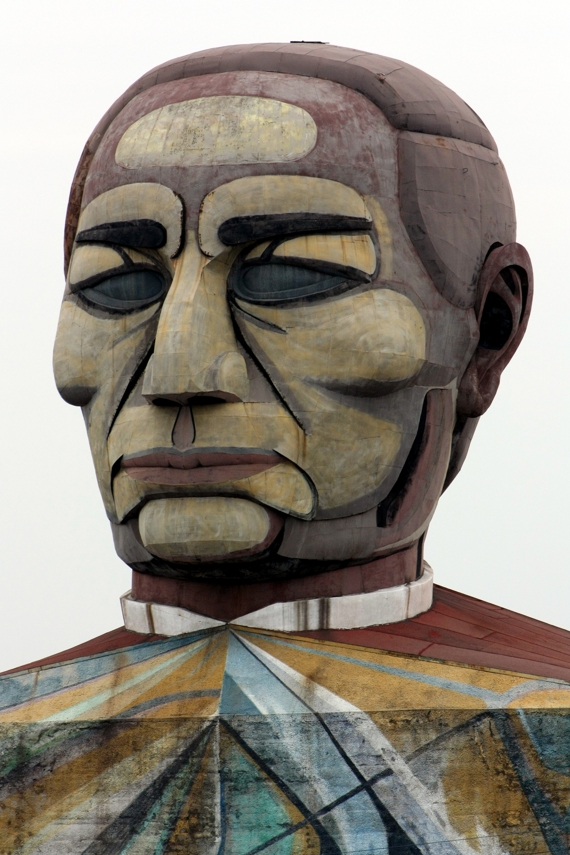
The sculpture on top of the Museo Cabeza de Juárez served as the inspiration for the station's pictogram.
