= Fábrica de Artes y Oficios Oriente =

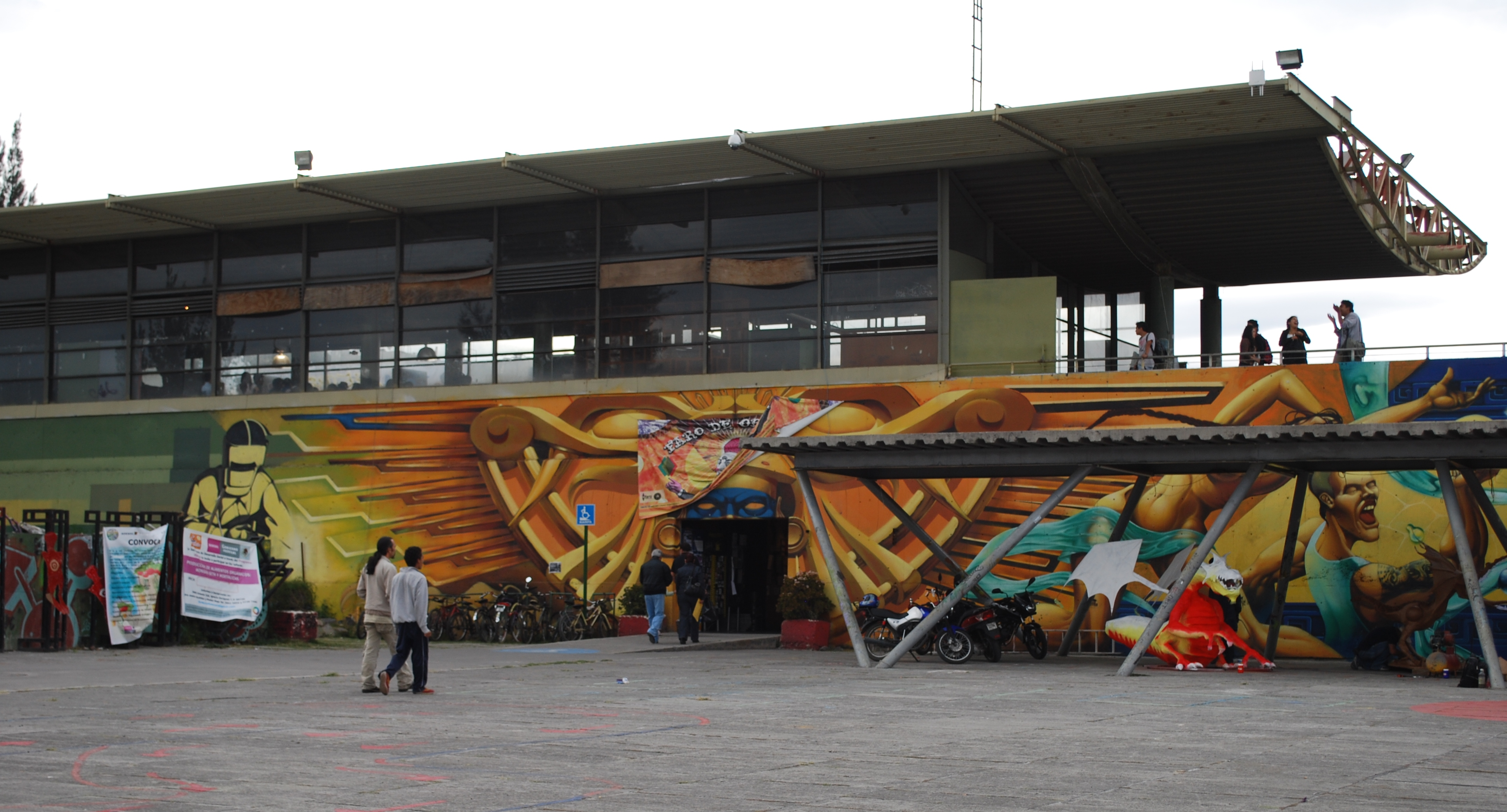
- View of the main building
- Abbreviation: FARO or FARO Oriente
- Type: GO
- Purpose: Cultural and training center
- Location: Iztapalapa, Mexico City
- Coordinates: 19°22′10.96″N 99°0′36.82″W
- Official language: Spanish
- Director: Agustín Estrada
- Budget: Nearly 6.8 million pesos/year

The Fábrica de Artes y Oficios Oriente (Arts and Trades Factory East), better known as FARO or FARO Oriente is a cultural center and training facility located in the Iztapalapa borough of Mexico City. It is the only major cultural facility on this side of the city. It was inaugurated in 2000 with the aim of providing educational and cultural opportunities for some of the most marginalized populations in Mexico City, providing an alternative to gangs and drugs. Today, the facility serves about 320,000 people each year, mostly from Iztapalapa but attracting youth from other areas of Mexico City as well. It provides free classes in various arts, handcrafts and trade skills as well as concerts, art exhibits, book presentations and more. In 2002 it received the Coming Up Taller Award from the United States.

== Site and facility ==
FARO Oriente is located on the corner of Calzada Ignacio Zaragoza, and Pinos, between the Peñon Viejo and Acatitla Metro stations in the eastern Iztapalapa borough of Mexico City, which is one of the most populated, poor and violent. The site covers 25,000m2 in a location called El Salado, referring to a former reservoir that was used to regulate the old Texcoco Lake . Nearby are a number of large housing developments, and every Wednesday it is surrounded by a large tianguis market.

It is the only major cultural center in the east of the city. The site consists of a main building and several satellite buildings. The main building has workshops, a toy library, a Clubhouse, a dance studio, a dining area, offices two art galleries, one of which is sixty meters long and various workshops. The library has a collection of about 30,000 books most related to art and trade. Near this is the Clubhouse, a large facility sponsored by the Boston Science Museum to allow 300 children and youths to use various creative tools from chisels to paper to digital instruments. FARO has two auditoriums, one of which is open air. There are plans to build a new theater facility, costing fifteen million pesos with a capacity of 450 people geared to plays and film screenings. It also has a greenhouse which specializes in plants that grow in saline soil as the soil in that area was the lake bed of a brackish reservoir.

== Mission and operation ==
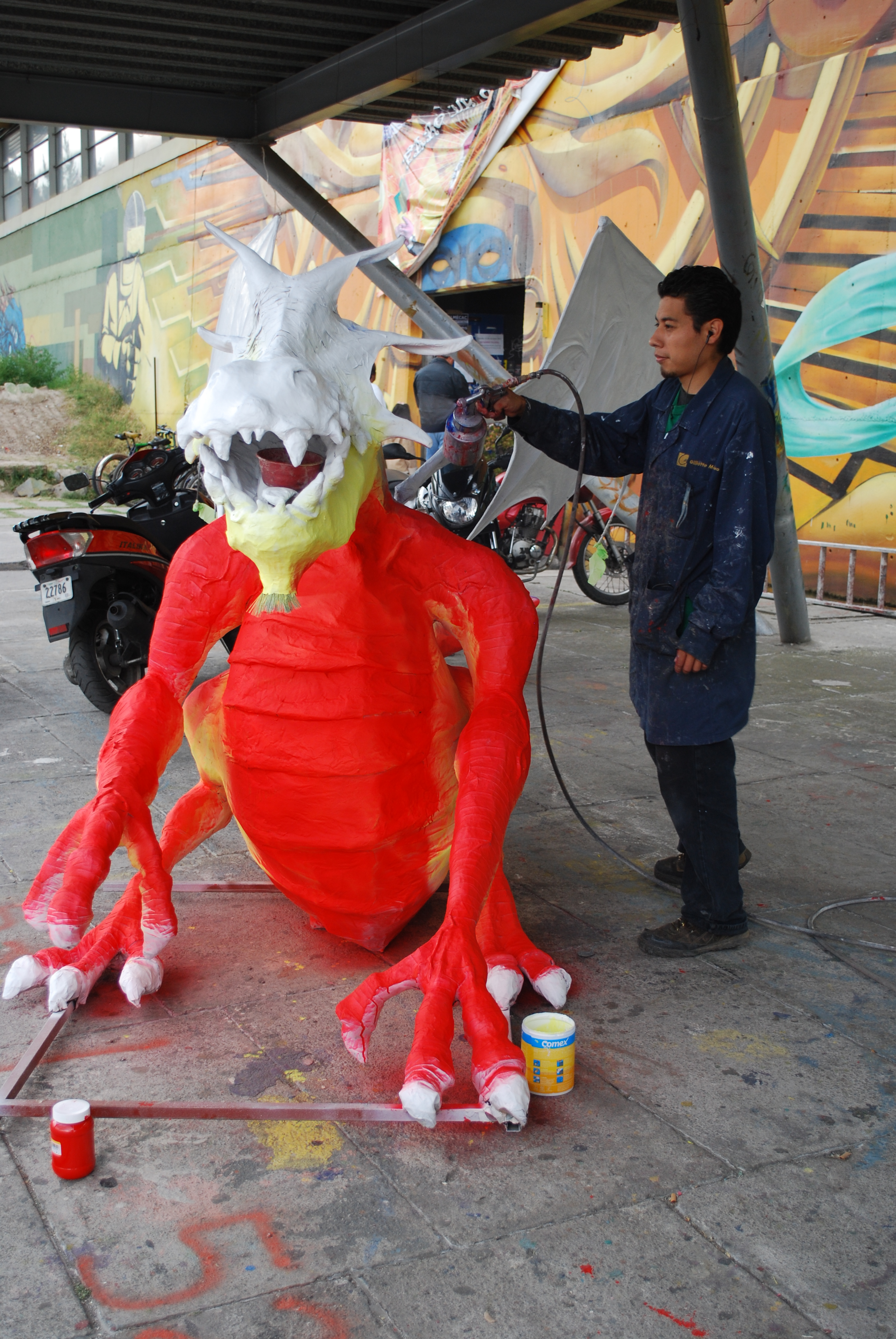
Painting a giant alebrije at the center

FARO was created by the Mexico City government as a model for cultural space to serve some of the most marginalized sections of the city in both location and socioeconomic resources. Rather than serve as entertainment for the middle class, like most cultural centers, FARO's mission is more aligned with education and marketable skills. Its purpose is to provides alternatives to gangs and drug addiction as well as promote experiences in self-organization, time management, creativity as well as personal and community development.

The facility has a basic annual budget of almost six million pesos per year to pay salaries, buy materials and organize activities. It has an additional budget of 800,000 pesos provide and promote other cultural activities such as concerts, book presentations, film clubs and more. It serves about 320,000 people per year, with about 1,800 people taking workshops at any given time. Sixty percent of the users come from the surrounding neighborhoods such as Solidaridad, Ermita Zaragoza, Fuentes Zaragoza, Santa Marta Norte and San Miguel Teotongo, but he facility has also attracted youth from other areas of the city such as Tepito, Del Cuernito and Tacubaya .

FARO offers fifty one different workshops for free with some charging a nominal fee for materials. Forty seven of these are sponsored by the Mexico City Secretary of Culture with the rest by other institutions. Most of these relate to the arts, handcrafts and trade skills, taught through artistic projects. Workshops are offered in photography, ceramics, carpentry, paintings, yoga, visual arts, poetry, tailoring, radio, capoeira, journalism, video and metalworking. There are twenty different classes for children in ceramics, comic drawing, dance and more. There are also workshops on child development for parents and sign language. For the latter, certification is offered by the Universidad Autónoma Metropolitana . FARO has thirty five teachers who earn about 135 pesos per hour, working seven hours a week. Various creators have participated in the operation of the facility including Eniac Martinez in photography, José Luis Paredes in music, Gabriel Macotela in sculpture, Emilio Payan en engraving, Jesusa Rodríguez in theatre, Eduardo Vazquez in literature and Radio Activo participates with courses in radio.

== History ==
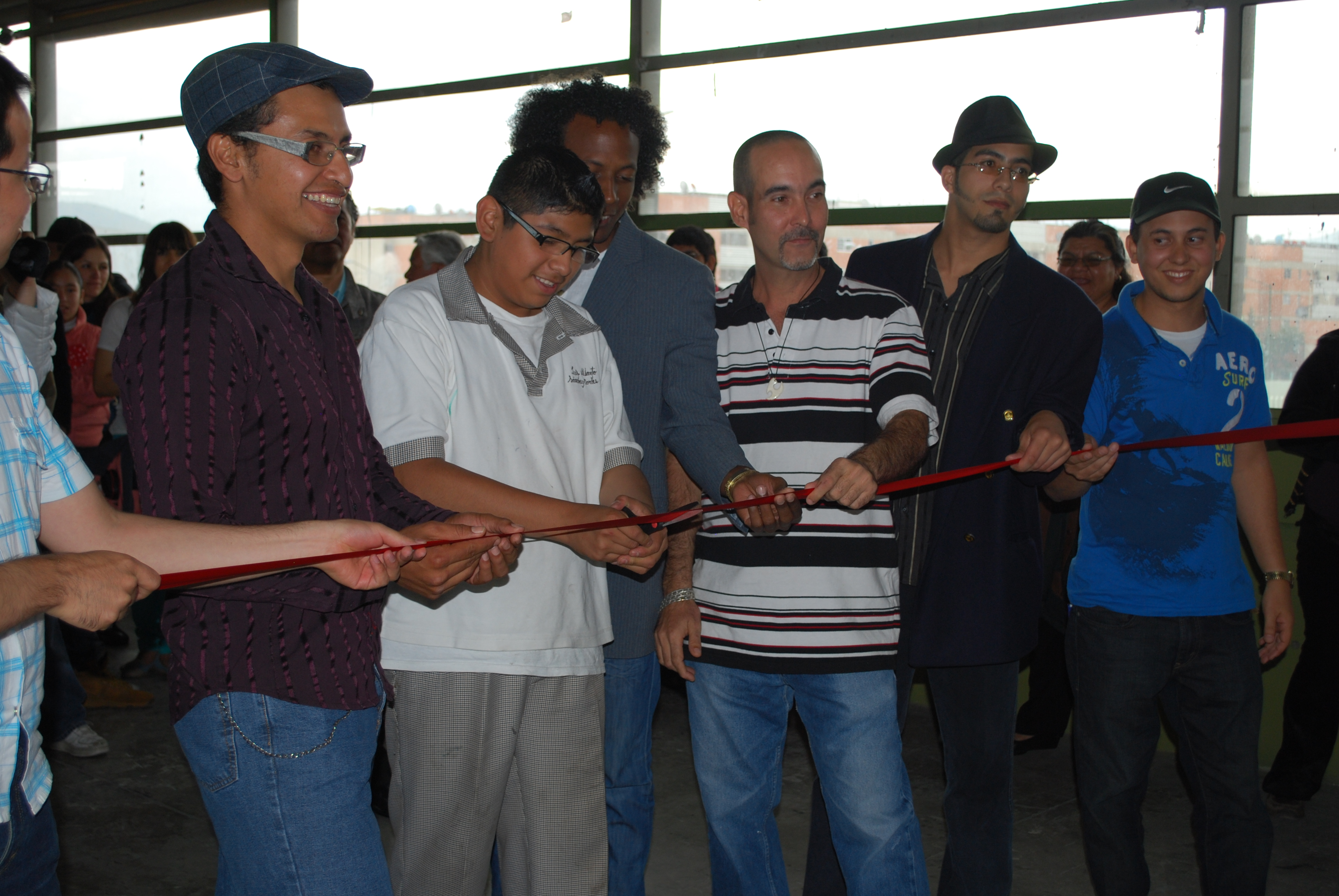
Ribbon cutting ceremony for the Nuevo Realismo Latinoamericano exhibition at the center

The cultural center originally began as a construction to house offices related to the Iztapalapa borough government in the early 1990s, designed by architect Alberto Kalach but never completed. It remained abandoned for six years. During that time, the site became notorious as a dumping ground for garbage, a place to dump bodies and the rape of women. At the end of the decade, the site was handed over to the Mexico City government which spent eight million pesos to rehabilitate it for the current FARO center, which was inaugurated in March 2000.

The project was initially conceived to serve youths but since has served a significant number of women and children. Since its founding, the director says that the surrounding neighborhood has quieted, as youths learn skills that allow them to earn money with honest work. The project has received awards such as the Coming Up Taller Award in 2002 from the President's Committee on the Arts and Humanities in the United States. Faro celebrated its tenth anniversary in 2010 with the slogan of “Ten years of cultural insurrection.”

In 2011, FARO participated in the Festival Iberoamericano de Cultura Musical Vive Latino at the Foro Sol, sending five trailers which were joined to create an art gallery on the site.

The success of FARO Oriente prompted the creation of three other similar centers in the Milpa Alta, Tláhuac and Gustavo A. Madero boroughs. Like the original, these centers have been located in rundown or abandoned areas in order to rehabilitate the space.
