= Canal de San Juan metro station =

Mexico City metro station

Canal de San Juan
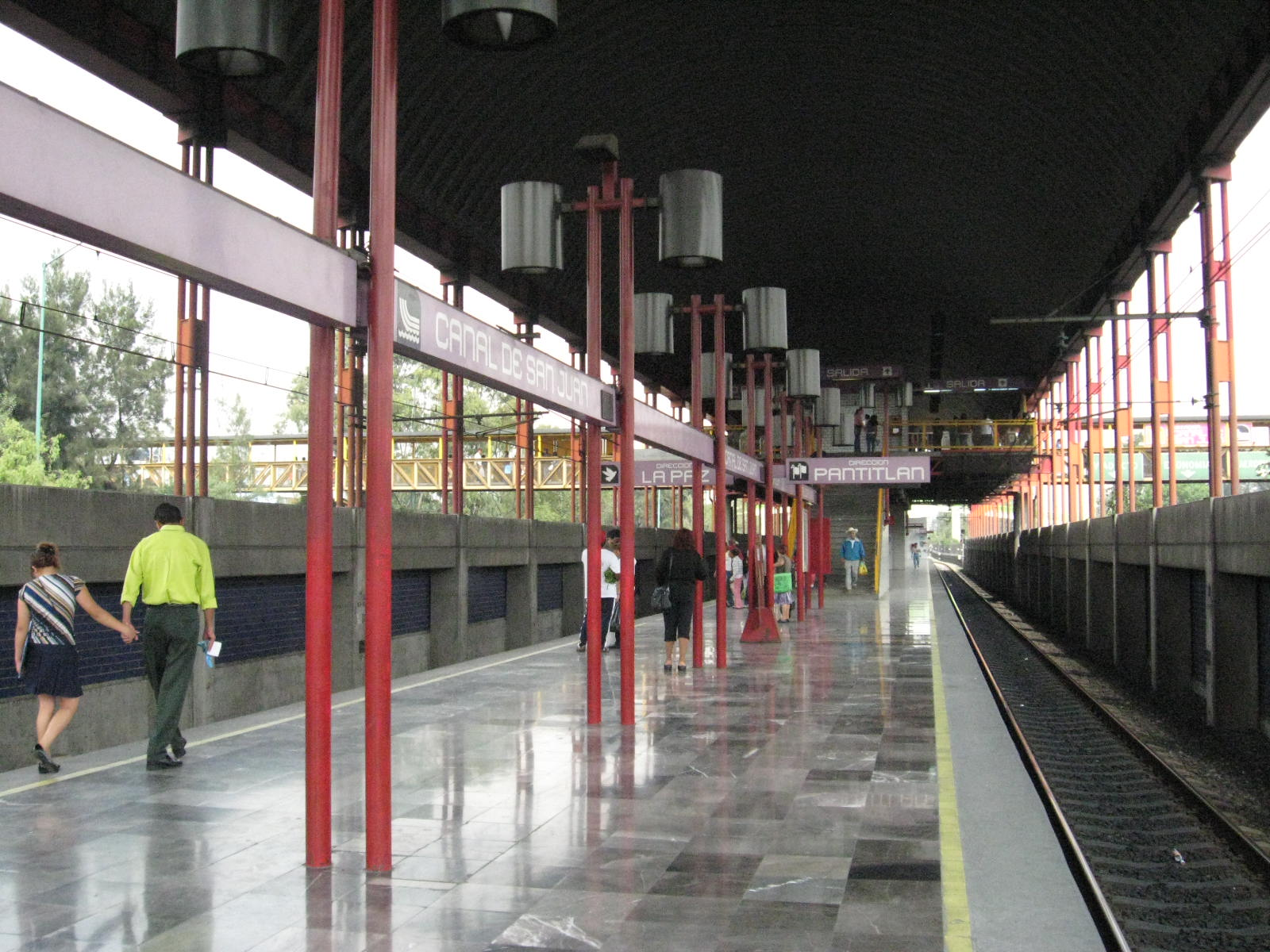
- Platform of Canal de San Juan

General information
- Location: Iztacalco; Mexico City; Mexico
- Coordinates: 19°23′55″N 99°03′34″W
- System: Mexico City Metro
- Platforms: 1 island platform
- Tracks: 2
- Connections: Canal de San Juan

Construction
- Structure type: At grade

History
- Opened: 12 August 1991; 35 years ago

Passengers
- 2025: 4,014,892 (Note: The data here is limited to the most recent ten years to avoid excessive listings; earlier figures can be found in this page's history or on the Mexico City Metro website. To calculate the average daily ridership, the annual total is divided by 365 days (366 in leap years), with decimals omitted from the result. Each station per line is ranked individually, as the system counts transfer stations separately. The percentage change is calculated automatically using the data from the current year and the previous year.) ▲5.31%
- Rank: 132/195

Services
Preceding station	Mexico City Metro	Following station
Agrícola Oriental toward Pantitlán	Line A	Tepalcates toward La Paz
Route map
Location
- Location within Mexico City
- Area map

Canal de San Juan is a station along Line A of the Mexico City Metro. It is located in the Iztacalco municipality. In 2019, the station had an average ridership of 13,188 passengers per day.

== Name and pictogram ==
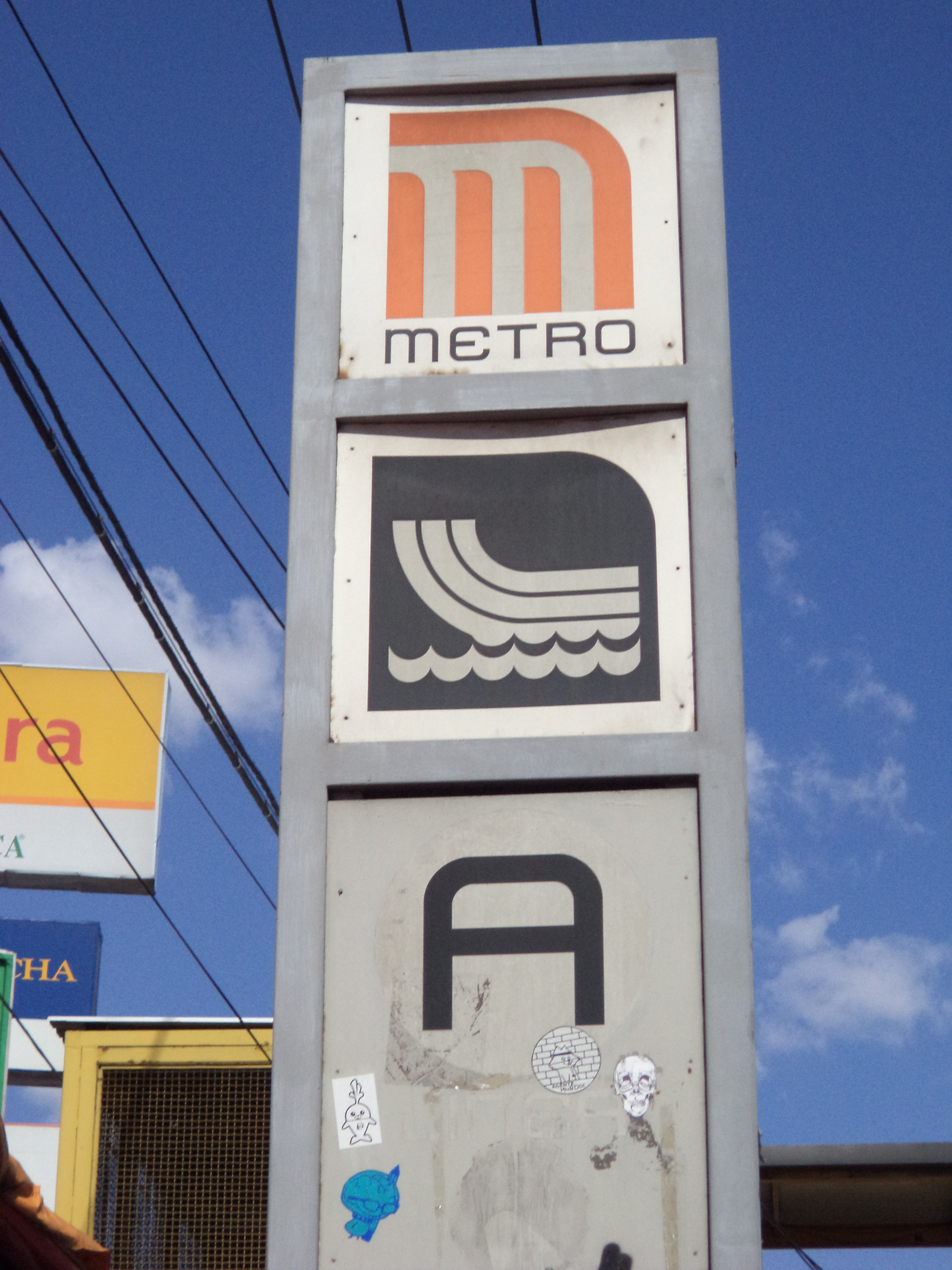
Entry sign

The station is located on the intersection of Calzada Ignacio Zaragoza and Canal de San Juan. Before it was dried and turned into a thoroughfare, as many other canals and rivers in Mexico City, the Canal de San Juan (San Juan Channel) connected Texcoco and Xochimilco.

Because of this, the pictogram for the station depicts the bow of an Aztec canoe travelling through a canal, commonly associated to the way the Aztecs used to travel along the canals in the Valley of Mexico.

== General information ==
The station was opened on 12 August 1991 along the other nine stations of Line A.

As every Line A station, except for Pantitlán, it is an at grade station in the median of Calzada Ignacio Zaragoza with the entrances on both sides of the road connecting to the station through two pedestrian bridges. Due to the design of the station, it has an island platform where passengers can take trains in both eastbound and westbound directions.

It is possible to connect with the bus rapid transit stop of the same name of the Mexico City Metrobús Line 2, which is within walking distance from the metro station.

From 23 April to 25 June 2020, the station was temporarily closed due to the COVID-19 pandemic in Mexico.

=== Ridership ===
Annual passenger ridership
Year	Ridership	Average daily	Rank	% change	Ref.
2024	4,014,892	10,999	132/195	+5.31%
2024	3,812,423	10,416	128/195	−13.07%
2023	4,385,503	12,015	107/195	+6.06%
2022	4,134,819	11,328	105/195	+25.95%
2021	3,282,914	8,994	98/195	+15.25%
2020	2,848,616	7,783	124/195	−40.82%
2019	4,813,813	13,188	134/195	+8.41%
2018	4,440,479	12,165	135/195	−2.36%
2017	4,547,862	12,459	133/195	−1.60%
2016	4,621,885	12,628	130/195	+4.62%
