= Santa Marta metro station =

Mexico City metro station

Santa Marta
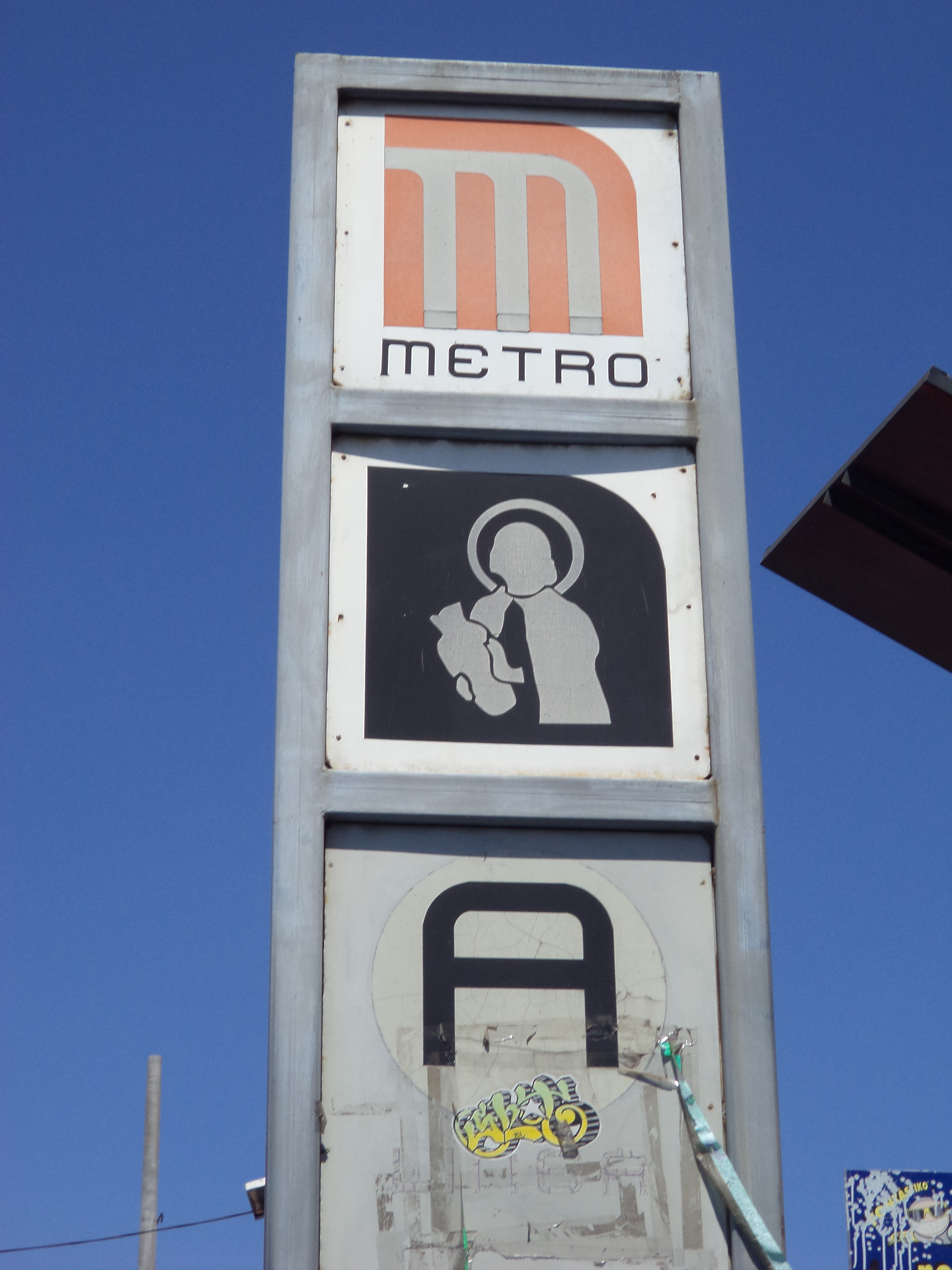
- Station entrance sign

General information
- Location: Mexico City; Mexico
- Coordinates: 19°21′36″N 98°59′42″W
- System: Mexico City Metro
- Operator: Sistema de Transporte Colectivo (STC)
- Platforms: 1 island platform
- Tracks: 2
- Connections: Santa Marta

Construction
- Structure type: At grade

Other information
- Status: In service

History
- Opened: 12 August 1991; 35 years ago

Passengers
- 2025: 12,748,407 (Note: The data here is limited to the most recent ten years to avoid excessive listings; earlier figures can be found in this page's history or on the Mexico City Metro website. To calculate the average daily ridership, the annual total is divided by 365 days (366 in leap years), with decimals omitted from the result. Each station per line is ranked individually, as the system counts transfer stations separately. The percentage change is calculated automatically using the data from the current year and the previous year.) ▲21.07%
- Rank: 12/195

Services
Preceding station	Mexico City Metro	Following station
Acatitla toward Pantitlán	Line A	Los Reyes toward La Paz
Route map
Location
- Location within Mexico City urban area
- Area map

Santa Marta (sometimes spelled Santa Martha) is a station along Line A of the Mexico City Metro. It is located in the Colonia Ermita Zaragoza neighborhood of the Iztapalapa borough in Mexico City.

The logo of the station depicts a silhouette of Saint Martha with a pitcher in her hands.

== Exits ==
- Northwest: Generalísimo Morelos street and Rocha and Pardiñas streets, Col. Ermita Zaragoza
- Northeast: Generalísimo Morelos street and Galeana street, Col. Ermita Zaragoza
- Southeast: Calzada Ignacio Zaragoza, Col. Lomas de Zaragoza

== Ridership ==
Annual passenger ridership
Year	Ridership	Average daily	Rank	% change	Ref.
2025	12,748,407	34,927	12/195	+21.07%
2024	10,529,826	28,770	26/195	+0.91%
2023	10,434,732	28,588	22/195	−9.02%
2022	11,469,310	31,422	18/195	+31.88%
2021	8,697,084	23,827	20/195	+17.78%
2020	7,384,101	20,175	26/195	−26.80%
2019	10,088,191	27,638	49/195	+4.86%
2018	9,620,244	26,356	53/195	+6.57%
2017	9,027,384	24,732	55/195	−3.21%
2016	9,326,927	25,483	56/195	+30.43%
