= Mexico City Metro Line A =

Metro line in Mexico City

Line A

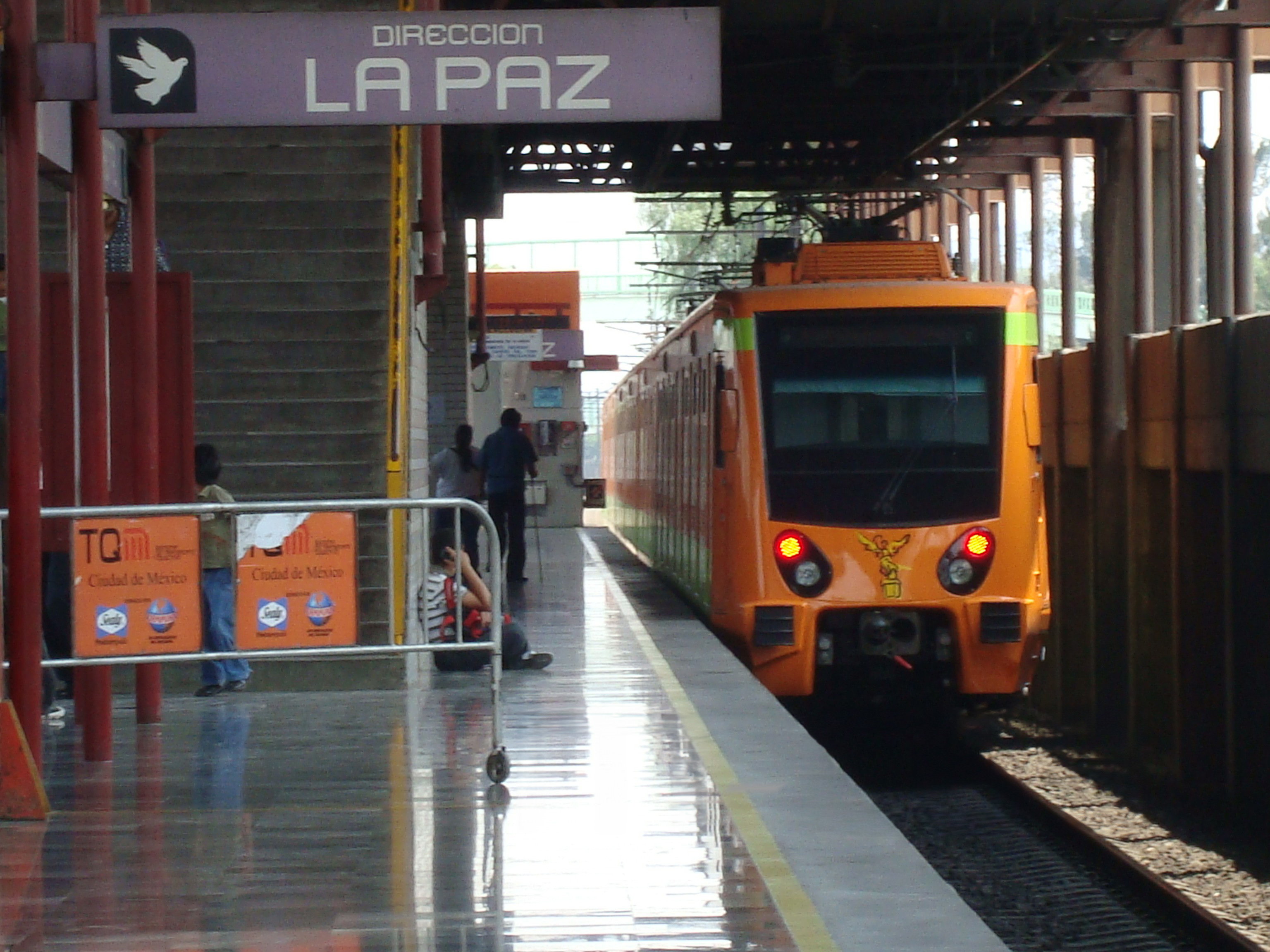
- FE-07 at the Agrícola Oriental station.

Overview
- Locale: Mexico City
- Termini: Pantitlán; La Paz
- Connecting lines: at Pantitlán
- Stations: 10
- Website: metro.cdmx.gob.mx

Service
- Type: Rapid transit
- System: Mexico City Metro
- Operator: Sistema de Transporte Colectivo (STC)
- Rolling stock: FM-86, FM-95A, FE-07
- Ridership: 71,683,242 (2024)

History
- Opened: 12 August 1991; 35 years ago

Technical
- Line length: 14.893 km (9.3 mi)
- Track length: 17.192 km (10.7 mi)
- Number of tracks: 2
- Track gauge: 1,435 mm (4 ft 8 1/2 in) standard gauge
- Electrification: Overhead line, 750 V DC
Route map
Line A route highlighted in gray

Line A is a Mexico City Metro line operating in Mexico City, Mexico. The line's color is purple. It was the ninth of twelve lines to be opened.

The line was opened in 1983 and it runs from eastern Mexico City southeast into the State of Mexico. Line A has 10 stations and a length of 17.192 km (10.683 mi), out of which 14.893 km (9.254 mi) are for service. It was the second line to service the State of Mexico, after the Cuatro Caminos station of the Line 2, opened in 1984.

== History ==
Line A was inaugurated on August 12, 1991, by Carlos Salinas de Gortari, President of Mexico from 1988 to 1994, Manuel Camacho Solís, Head of the Federal District Department from 1988 to 1993, and Ignacio Pichardo Pagaza, Governor of the State of Mexico from 1989 to 1993.

Line A was conceived as a feeder line, thus, instead of using a number (which, in this case, it would have been 10 – Line 10), it used a letter in its denomination. The line was designed to connect Mexico City to the State of Mexico. For this reason, until December 2013, it was necessary to pay another fare when commuting from Line A to Lines 1, 5 and 9 at Pantitlán station.

Another feeder line, also connecting the State of Mexico to Mexico City, would be inaugurated in 1999: Line B, also using a letter instead of a number to designate it.

A proposed extension of the line was presented in 2018 by the Sistema de Transporte Colectivo. According to the plan, Line A would be expanded southbound towards Chalco in the State of Mexico. The stretch would have six new stations and a length of 13.19 km (8.20 mi).

== Rolling stock ==
Line A has had different types of rolling stock throughout the years.

- Concarril FM-86: 1991–present
- Concarril FM-95A: 1998–present
- CAF FE-07: 2010–present

Currently, out of the 390 trains in the Mexico City Metro network, 17 are in service in Line A.

== Station list ==
Key (Note: The following list was adapted from different websites and official maps.: Metro connections obtained from the official Mexico City Metro system map.; Accessibility obtained from the Mexico City Metro system map. In some cases, the map omits the accessibility icon as the station(s) are actually partially accessible. However, the respective websites of each station on the official site indicate the respective accessibility methods. Stations with the symbol ‡ are fully accessible; stations with the symbol † are partially accessible.; Cablebús obtained from their official website.; Centro de transferencia modal (CETRAM;) obtained from the official website of the Órgano Regulador de Transporte.; Ecobici obtained from their official website.; Metrobús obtained from the Mexico City Metrobús system map.; Mexibús obtained from the official Mexico City Metro system map.; Mexicable obtained from the official Mexico City Metro system map.; Public buses network (peseros) obtained from the official website of the Órgano Regulador de Transporte.; Red de Transporte de Pasajeros obtained from their official website.; Trolleybuses obtained from their official website.)
Handicapped/disabled access	Fully accessible station	Cablebús Line {{{3}}}	Cablebús connection	Red de Transporte de Pasajeros	RTP connection
Handicapped/disabled access	Partially accessible station	Mexibús	Mexibús connection	Tren Interurbano	Tren Interurbano connection
Transfer hub	CETRAM transfer station	Mexicable	Mexicable connection	Tren Suburbano	Tren Suburbano connection
Transfer hub	ETRAM transfer station	Mexico City Metro	Mexico City Metro connection	Trolleybus	Trolleybus connection
Ecobici	Ecobici bikeshare	Mexico City minubus	Pesero connection	Xochimilco Light Rail	Xochimilco Light Rail connection

The stations from west to east:

No.	Station	Date opened	Level	Distance (km)		Connection	Pictogram	Location	
No.	Station	Date opened	Level	Between stations	Total	Connection	Pictogram	Location	
01	Pantitlán ‡	12 August 1991	Underground	-	0.0	168; 11B, 11C, 19F, 19G	Two flags	Iztacalco/ Venustiano Carranza	Mexico City
02	Agrícola Oriental	12 August 1991	Grade-level, overground access	1.6	1.6	162B, 163, 163A, 163B, 164, 166, 167; 11G	Two ears of wheat	Iztacalco	Mexico City
03	Canal de San Juan	12 August 1991	Grade-level, overground access	1.2	2.8	47A, 162B, 163, 163A, 163B, 164, 166, 167; 4B, 4C, 9B (at distance), 9E (at distance), 14A (at distance)	Bow of an Aztec canoe	Iztacalco	Mexico City
04	Tepalcates †	12 August 1991	Grade-level, overground access	1.6	4.4	162B, 163, 163A, 163B, 164, 166, 167; 9D, 9E	Side view of a pre-Hispanic pottery bowl	Iztapalapa	Mexico City
05	Guelatao	12 August 1991	Grade-level, overground access	1.3	5.7	162B, 163, 163A, 163B, 164, 166, 167; 9D	Museo Cabeza de Juárez sculpture	Iztapalapa	Mexico City
06	Peñón Viejo	12 August 1991	Grade-level, overground access	2.4	8.1	162B, 163, 163A, 163B, 164, 166, 167	Peñon Viejo rock formation	Iztapalapa	Mexico City
07	Acatitla	12 August 1991	Grade-level, overground access	1.5	9.6	162B, 163, 163A, 163B, 164, 166, 167	Aztec solar day reed	Iztapalapa	Mexico City
08	Santa Marta †	12 August 1991	Grade-level, overground access	1.3	10.9	1D, 52C	Saint Martha with a pitcher	Iztapalapa	Mexico City
09	Los Reyes	12 August 1991	Grade-level, overground access	1.9	12.8		Three crowns	La Paz	State of Mexico
10	La Paz †	12 August 1991	Grade-level, overground access	2.1	14.9		A dove	La Paz	State of Mexico

== Ridership ==
The following table shows each of Line A stations total and average daily ridership during 2019.

‡	Terminal
†‡	Transfer station and terminal

Rank	Station	Total ridership	Average daily
1	Pantitlán†‡	45,550,938	124,797
2	La Paz‡	15,636,790	42,841
3	Santa Marta	10,088,191	27,639
4	Guelatao	7,898,506	21,640
5	Tepalcates	7,054,067	19,326
6	Los Reyes	6,242,517	17,103
7	Acatitla	5,846,455	16,018
8	Peñón Viejo	5,025,958	13,770
9	Canal de San Juan	4,813,813	13,189
10	Agrícola Oriental	4,130,829	11,317
Total		112,288,064	307,639

== See also ==
- List of Mexico City Metro lines
