= Tepalcates metro station =

Mexico City metro station

Tepalcates
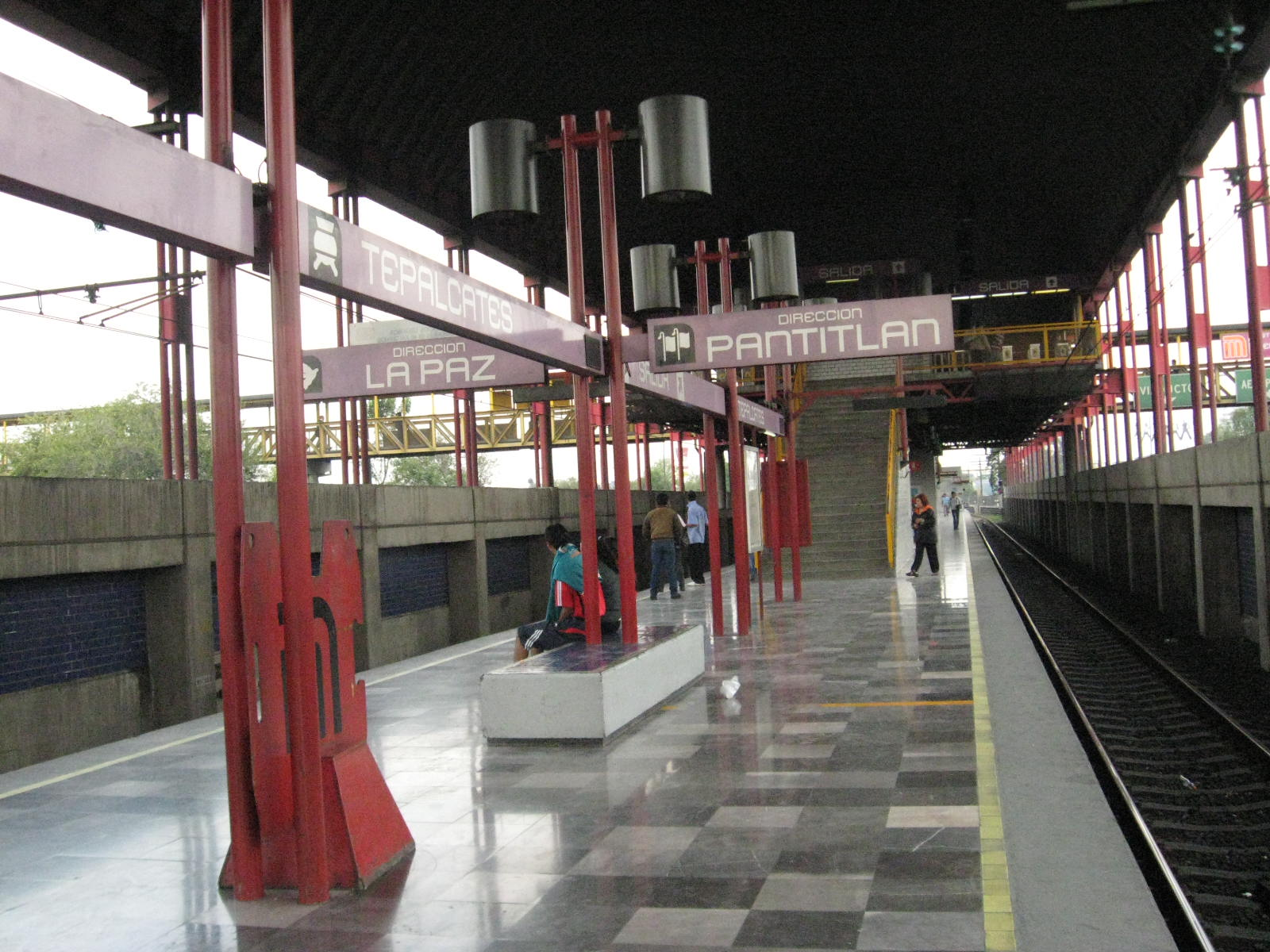
- Platform of Tepalcates

General information
- Location: Iztapalapa; Mexico City; Mexico
- Coordinates: 19°23′29″N 99°02′47″W
- System: Mexico City Metro
- Platforms: 1 island platform
- Tracks: 2
- Connections: Tepalcates

Construction
- Structure type: At grade

History
- Opened: 12 August 1991; 35 years ago

Passengers
- 2025: 8,386,963 (Note: The data here is limited to the most recent ten years to avoid excessive listings; earlier figures can be found in this page's history or on the Mexico City Metro website. To calculate the average daily ridership, the annual total is divided by 365 days (366 in leap years), with decimals omitted from the result. Each station per line is ranked individually, as the system counts transfer stations separately. The percentage change is calculated automatically using the data from the current year and the previous year.) ▼10.32%
- Rank: 43/195

Services
Preceding station	Mexico City Metro	Following station
Canal de San Juan toward Pantitlán	Line A	Guelatao toward La Paz
Route map
Location
- Location within Mexico City
- Area map

Tepalcates is a station on the Line A of the Mexico City Metro. It is located in the Iztapalapa municipality, to the east of downtown Mexico City. In 2019, the station had an average ridership of 19,326 passengers per day.

== Name and pictogram ==
The station takes its name from the nearby estate Unidad Habitacional Tepalcates. The name has its roots in the Nahuatl word "teplacatl" used to refer to any pot or vessel made out of clay or mud. The pictogram depicts the side view of a pre-Hispanic pottery bowl of the types made in Puebla and Tlaxcala.

== General information ==
The station was opened on 12 August 1991 along the other nine stations of Line A.

Metro Tepalcates connects with the bus rapid transit stop of the same name of the Mexico City Metrobús Line 2; this stop is the eastern terminus of Line 2.

As every Line A station, except for Pantitlán, it is an at grade station in the median of Calzada Ignacio Zaragoza with the entrances on both sides of the road connecting to the station through two pedestrian bridges. Due to the design of the station, it has an island platform where passengers can take trains in both eastbound and westbound directions.

=== Ridership ===
Annual passenger ridership
Year	Ridership	Average daily	Rank	% change	Ref.
2025	8,386,963	22,977	43/195	−10.32%
2024	9,351,995	25,551	34/195	+8.53%
2023	8,617,224	23,608	37/195	+15.67%
2022	7,449,534	20,409	41/195	+39.81%
2021	5,328,315	14,598	46/195	+6.88%
2020	4,985,092	13,620	58/195	−29.33%
2019	7,054,067	19,326	92/195	+11.71%
2018	6,314,510	17,300	104/195	+22.80%
2017	5,142,008	14,087	122/195	−17.62%
2016	6,241,923	17,054	107/195	+4.85%

== Exits ==
- North: Calzada Ignacio Zaragoza and General Esteban Baca Calderón street, Colonia Juan Escutia
- South: Calzada Ignacio Zaragoza and Avenida Telecomunicaciones, Unidad Habitacional Tepalcates

== Station layout ==
G	Street Level	Exits/Entrances
G Platforms	Westbound	← toward Pantitlán (Canal de San Juan)
G Platforms	Island platform, doors will open on the left
G Platforms	Eastbound	toward La Paz (Guelatao)→

== Gallery ==
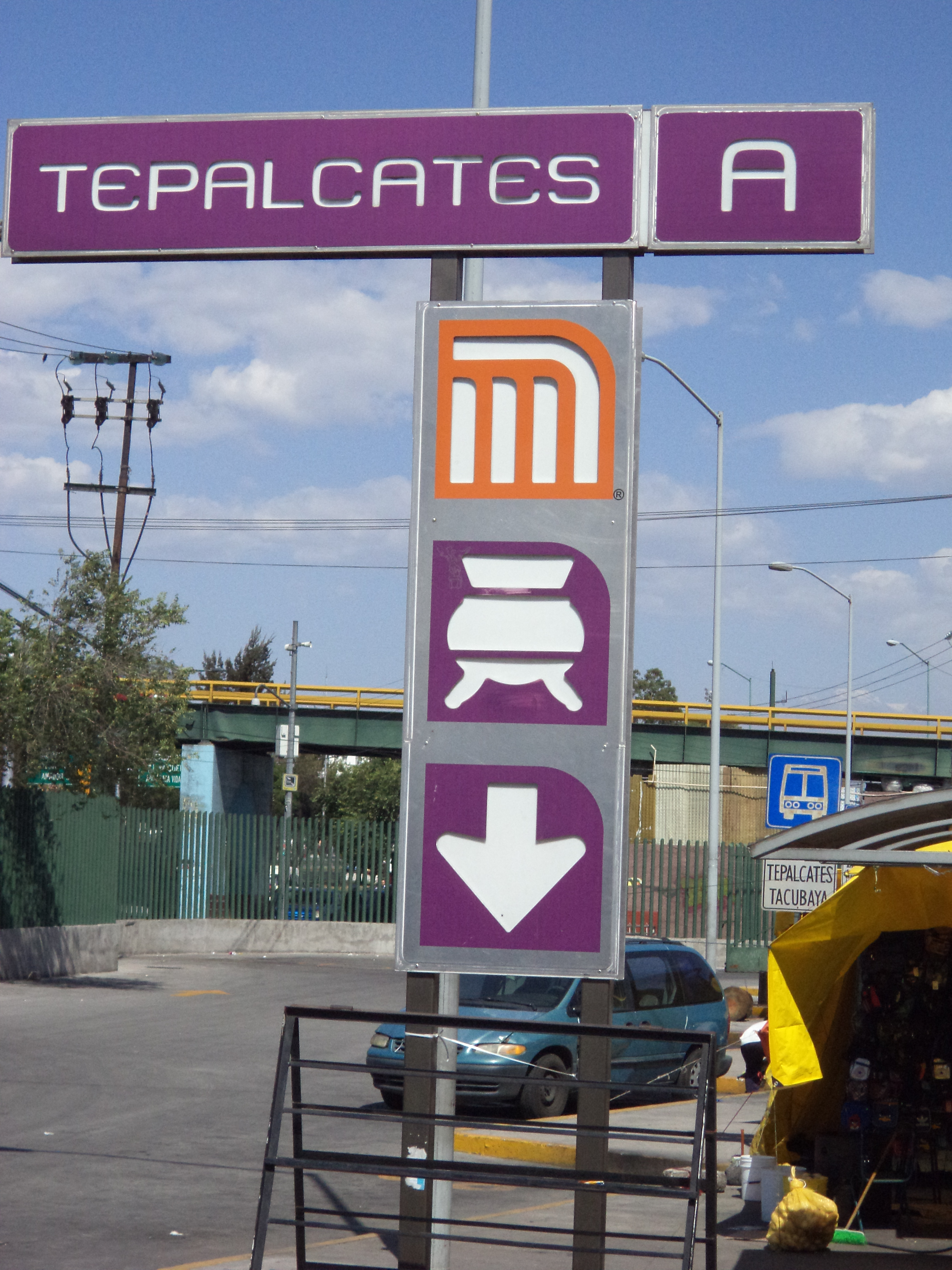
Entry sign
