= FE-07 =

Type of electrical multiple unit train used on the Mexico City Metro

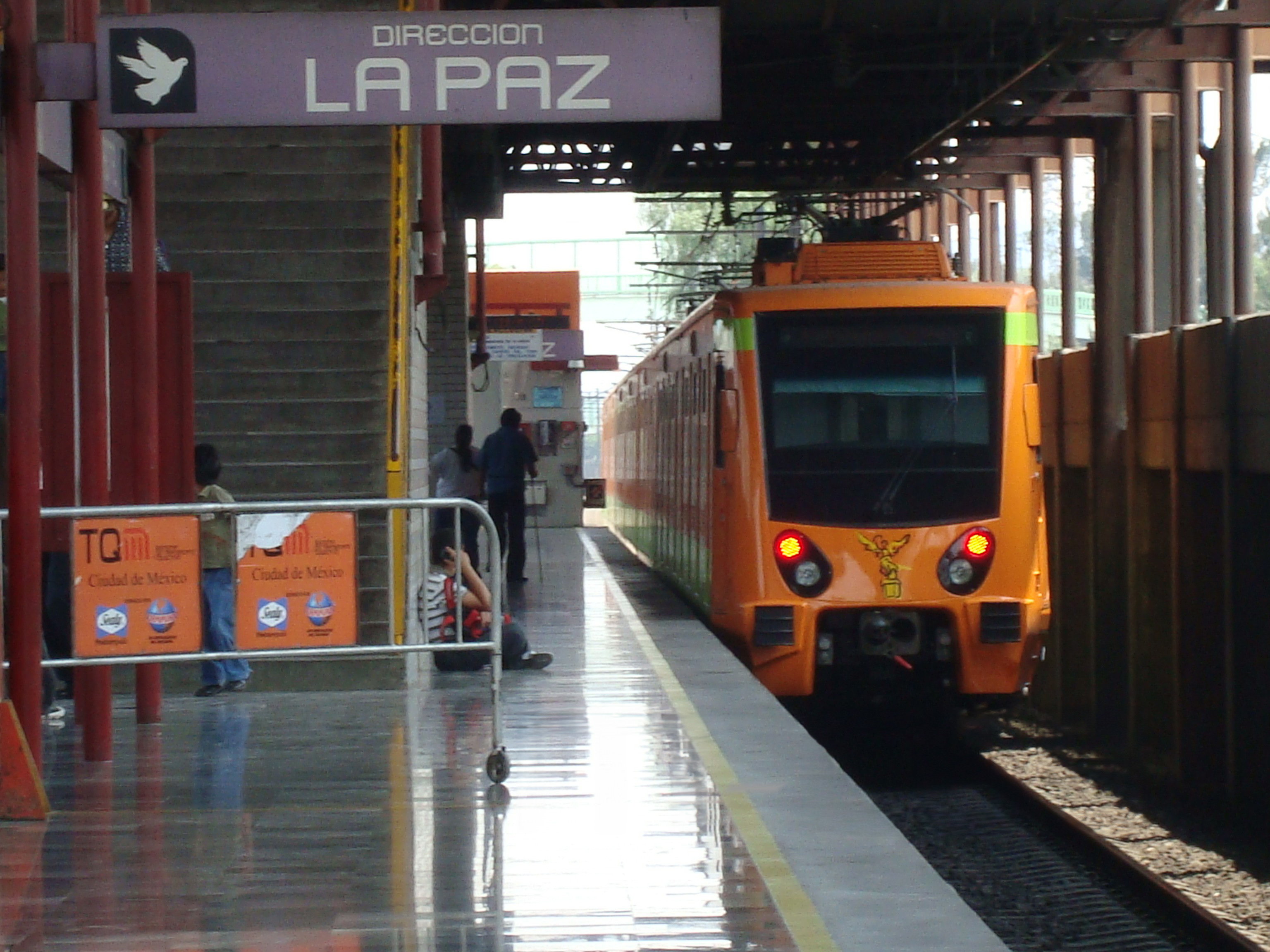
- FE-07 in Line A of Mexico City Metro at Agrícola Oriental.

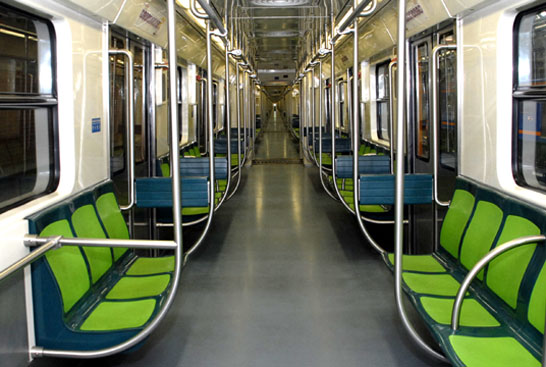
- Interior of an FE-07 car
- In service: 2009–present
- Manufacturer: CAF
- Entered service: 2009
- Number built: 81 cars (9 trains)
- Formation: 9 cars per trainset
- Capacity: 1750
- Operator: STC
- Line served: Mexico City Metro Line A

Specifications
- Train length: 150 m (492 ft 2 in)
- Width: 280 cm (9 ft 2 in)
- Maximum speed: 85 km/h (53 mph)
- Weight: 238 t (234 long tons; 262 short tons)
- Traction system: Mitsubishi (2-level IGBT-VVVF Inverter)
- Power output: 4,065 kW (5,451 hp)
- Electric system: Catenary 750 V DC
- Current collection: Pantograph
- Track gauge: 1,435 mm (4 ft 8 1/2 in) standard gauge

The FE-07 (abbreviated from the Spanish: Férreo Español 2007) is a steel-wheeled model of electrical multiple units used on the Mexico City Metro, entering service in 2009 and currently servicing Line A.

== Conception ==
The trains are powered by an overhead catenary with 750V DC and the power supply is by means of a pantograph mechanism, with a carbon friction skate. The metal wheels, made of forged steel, perform the same guiding function and transmit the traction-braking forces.

Each car is supported by two bogies or railroad-type trolleys, each consisting of two axles at the ends of which two metal wheels are fixed, which roll on railroad-type metal rails. The wheels, in addition to supporting the load of the vehicle, serve to guide the trains as well as for their movement.

The train has a disc brake system on each axle, on both sides of the disc there are semi-metallic brake linings (chemical compound), the braking works based on compressed air.

The power supply to the driving cars is carried out through the pantograph (equipment mounted on the roof of the cars that has an upward and downward movement) which remains in contact during the movement of the trains with the contact wire of the compound catenary (this is a power supply system, whose function is to provide electric power to moving trains, it is made up of 7 wires attached to pendulums and harnesses that allow its attachment to poles along the Line).

This train was acquired in response to the fact that the FM-95As were spending more time in the workshops than in service and the lack of spare parts for them, in addition to serving as a support for the FM-86s that would have carried the entire load due to the decommissioning of almost the entire FM-95A fleet.

The driving train FM-0083/FM-0084 suffered a derailment, but the insurance policy took care of putting the train back into operation.

It is worth noting that this accident occurred in 2016.

== Description ==
The FE–07 currently services Line A only. Each train is equipped with alarm levers, ATP-ATO automatic driving system, passenger information and video entertainment systems, CCTV, and saloon and cab ventilation systems. This is the first steel-wheeled rolling stock in the metro network to feature open gangways, allowing passengers to move seamlessly between train cars, the first overall train to have this feature was the NM-02.

The entire length of a train is 150 meters (490 ft).

Interior side coverings, side hatches and roofs made of fibreglass-reinforced polyester. Passenger seats in SMC.

== Technical specifications ==
- Train length: 150 m (492 ft 1 1/2 in)
- Overall width: 2.400 m (7 ft 10 1/2 in)
- Height of a train car above the running surface: 3.485 m (11 ft 5 1/4 in)
- Floor height above the running surface: 1.180 m (46.46 in)
- Weight in running order: 126.4 tonnes (124.4 long tons; 139.3 short tons)
- Maximum capacity (at six travelers / m^{2}): 1750 passengers
- Maximum speed: 85 km/h (53 mph)
- Maximum power: 4,065 kW (5,451 hp)
- Average acceleration of 1.2 m/s^{2} (3.9 ft/s^{2})
- Maximum braking normal steady state: 1.1 m/s^{2} (3.6 ft/s^{2})
- Wi-Fi system
