= Peñón Viejo metro station =

Mexico City metro station

Peñón Viejo
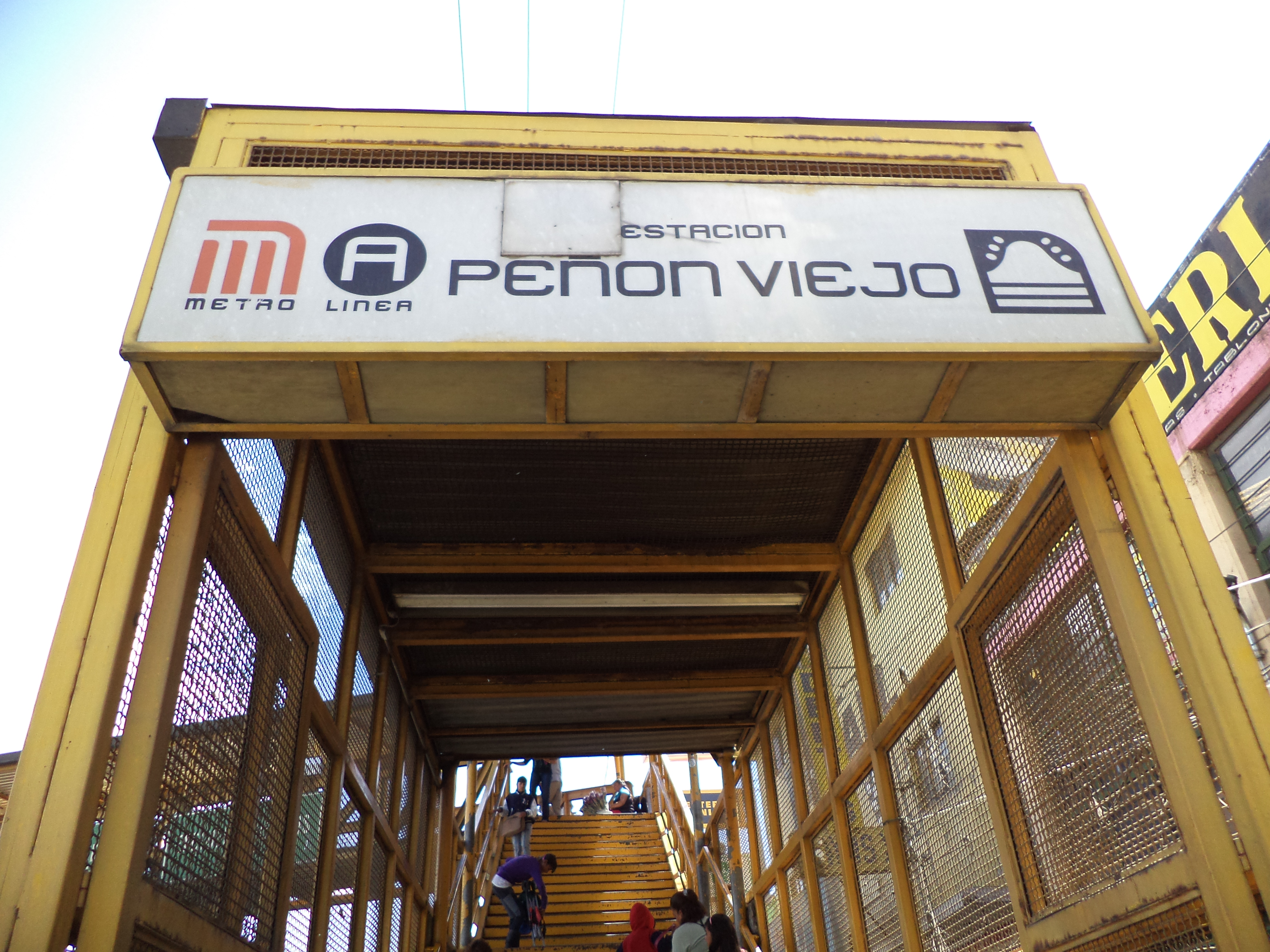

General information
- Location: Mexico City; Mexico
- Coordinates: 19°22′24″N 99°01′02″W
- System: Mexico City Metro
- Platforms: 1 island platform
- Tracks: 2

Construction
- Structure type: At grade

History
- Opened: 12 August 1991; 35 years ago

Passengers
- 2025: 4,170,975 (Note: The data here is limited to the most recent ten years to avoid excessive listings; earlier figures can be found in this page's history or on the Mexico City Metro website. To calculate the average daily ridership, the annual total is divided by 365 days (366 in leap years), with decimals omitted from the result. Each station per line is ranked individually, as the system counts transfer stations separately. The percentage change is calculated automatically using the data from the current year and the previous year.) ▲2.66%
- Rank: 127/195

Services
Preceding station	Mexico City Metro	Following station
Guelatao toward Pantitlán	Line A	Acatitla toward La Paz
Route map
Location
- Location within Mexico City urban area
- Area map

Peñon Viejo is a station along Line A of the Mexico City Metro. It is located in the Colonia Santa Martha Acatitla Norte and Colonia Santa Martha Acatitla Sur neighborhoods of the Iztapalapa borough of Mexico City.

The logo is an Aztec-based glyph showing a rock that represents the Peñon Viejo formation near the station. The station was opened on 12 August 1991.

== Ridership ==
Annual passenger ridership
Year	Ridership	Average daily	Rank	% change	Ref.
2025	4,170,975	11,427	127/195	+2.66%
2024	4,062,865	11,100	121/195	−9.37%
2023	4,482,986	12,282	106/195	+1.40%
2022	4,421,246	12,113	96/195	+33.54%
2021	3,310,816	9,070	96/195	+21.39%
2020	2,727,511	7,472	127/195	−45.73%
2019	5,025,958	13,769	129/195	+7.89%
2018	4,658,352	12,762	131/195	+4.05%
2017	4,477,026	12,265	135/195	−0.31%
2016	4,490,782	12,269	134/195	+27.57%
