= Acatitla metro station =

Mexico City metro station

Acatitla
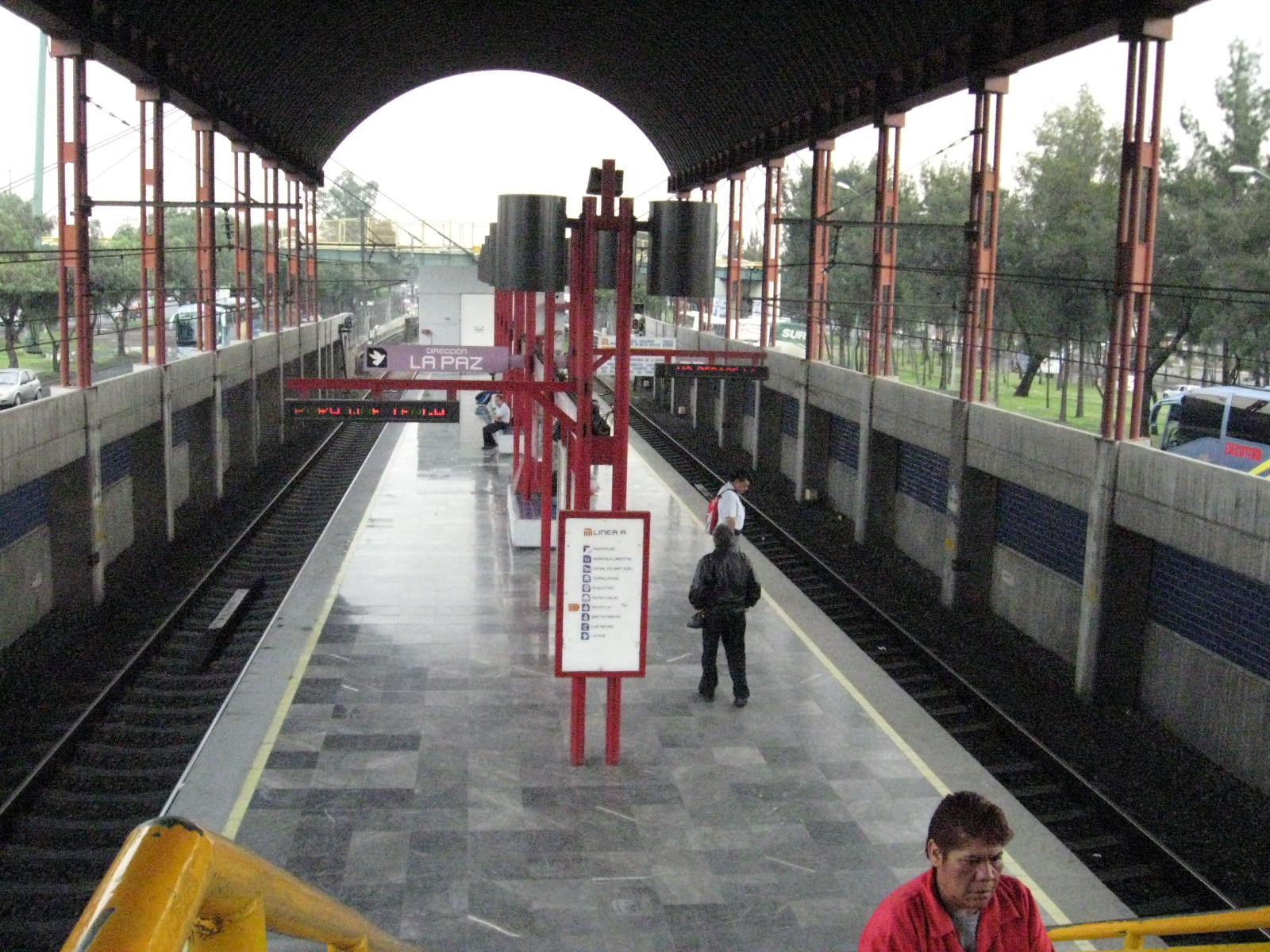
- Island platform of Acatitla

General information
- Location: Mexico City; Mexico
- Coordinates: 19°21′53″N 99°00′21″W
- System: Mexico City Metro
- Platforms: 1 island platform
- Tracks: 2

Construction
- Structure type: At grade

History
- Opened: 12 August 1991; 35 years ago

Passengers
- 2025: 4,977,505 (Note: The data here is limited to the most recent ten years to avoid excessive listings; earlier figures can be found at Wikidata. To calculate the average daily ridership, the annual total is divided by 365 days (366 in leap years), with decimals omitted from the result. Each station per line is ranked individually, as the system counts transfer stations separately. The percentage change is calculated automatically using the data from the current year and the previous year.) ▲2.09%
- Rank: 105/195

Services
Preceding station	Mexico City Metro	Following station
Peñón Viejo toward Pantitlán	Line A	Santa Marta toward La Paz
Route map
Location
- Location within Mexico City urban area
- Area map

Acatitla is a station along Line A of the Mexico City Metro. It is an aboveground station. The station has connections to bus routes 162B, 163, 163A, 163B, 164, and 166. Service at this station began 12 August 1991.

== Ridership ==
Annual passenger ridership
Year	Ridership	Average daily	Rank	% change	Ref.
2025	4,977,505	13,637	105/195	+2.09%
2024	4,875,822	13,321	99/195	−9.40%
2023	5,381,808	14,744	86/195	−3.39%
2022	5,570,877	15,262	73/195	+53.02%
2021	3,640,691	9,974	84/195	−4.62%
2020	3,817,048	10,429	95/195	−34.71%
2019	5,846,455	16,017	113/195	+0.31%
2018	5,828,441	15,968	111/195	−13.41%
2017	6,731,039	18,441	93/195	+1.27%
2016	6,646,731	18,160	102/195	+26.10%
