= Agrícola Oriental metro station =

Mexico City metro station

Agrícola Oriental
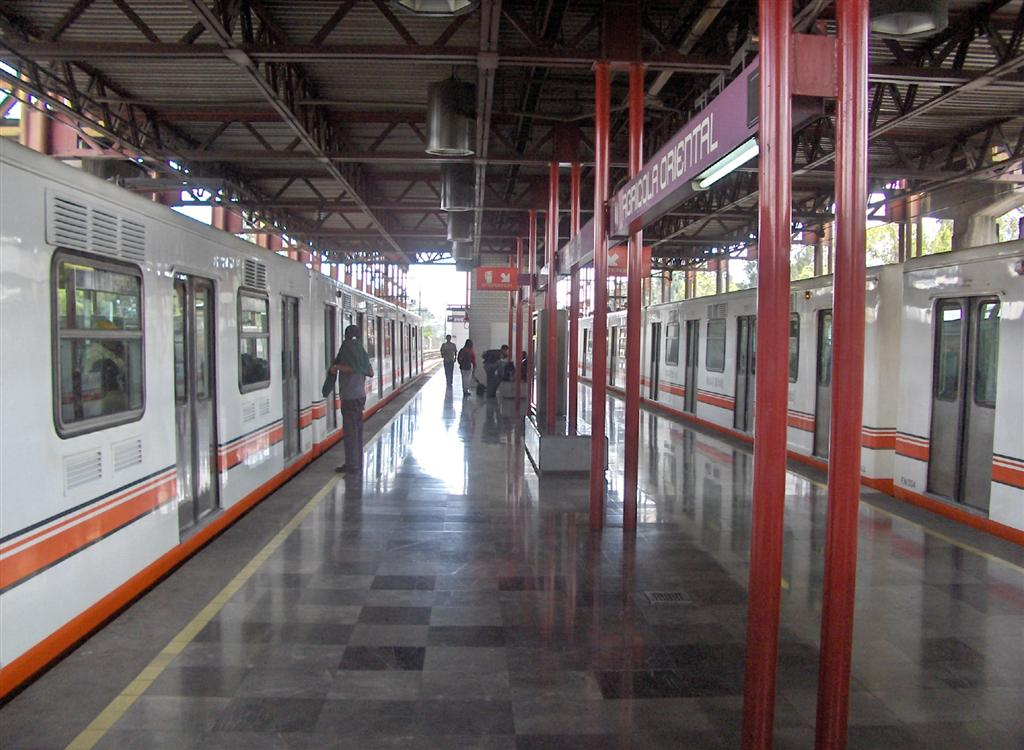

General information
- Location: Calzada Ignacio Zaragoza; Agrícola Oriental, Iztacalco; Mexico City; Mexico
- Coordinates: 19°24′17″N 99°04′12″W
- System: Mexico City Metro
- Platforms: 1 island platform
- Tracks: 2

Construction
- Structure type: At grade

History
- Opened: 12 August 1991; 35 years ago

Passengers
- 2025: 3,666,485 (Note: The data here is limited to the most recent ten years to avoid excessive listings; earlier figures can be found in this page's history or on the Mexico City Metro website. To calculate the average daily ridership, the annual total is divided by 365 days (366 in leap years), with decimals omitted from the result. Each station per line is ranked individually, as the system counts transfer stations separately. The percentage change is calculated automatically using the data from the current year and the previous year.) ▼6.3%
- Rank: 140/195

Services
Preceding station	Mexico City Metro	Following station
Pantitlán Terminus	Line A	Canal de San Juan toward La Paz
Route map
Location
- Location within Mexico City
- Area map

Agrícola Oriental is a metro station on Line A of the Mexico City Metro system. It is located in the Iztacalco municipality. In 2019, the station had an average ridership of 11,317 passengers per day, making it the least used station in Line A.

== Name and pictogram ==
The station is named for the neighborhood it lies in: the colonia Agrícola Oriental, a mixed-use neighborhood in eastern Mexico City. The name "agrícola" translates to agricultural; therefore, the station's pictogram depicts two spikes of wheat.

== General information ==
The station opened on 12 August 1991 along with the other stations on Line A.

Like every Line A station, except for Pantitlán, it is an at-grade station in the median of Calzada Ignacio Zaragoza with the entrances on both sides of the road connecting to the station through two pedestrian bridges. The station is near the intersection of Calle 1 in Colonia Agrícola Oriental of Iztacalco borough. It lies to the east of the Autódromo Hermanos Rodríguez.

From 23 April to 25 June 2020, the station was temporarily closed due to the COVID-19 pandemic in Mexico.

=== Ridership ===
Annual passenger ridership
Year	Ridership	Average daily	Rank	% change	Ref.
2025	3,666,485	10,045	140/195	−6.30%
2024	3,913,047	10,691	125/195	−3.96%
2023	4,074,344	11,162	111/195	+21.59%
2022	3,350,796	9,180	124/195	+21.05%
2021	2,768,101	7,583	118/195	+19.14%
2020	2,323,371	6,348	142/195	−43.76%
2019	4,130,829	11,317	146/195	+5.01%
2018	3,933,652	10,777	149/195	+7.73%
2017	3,651,505	10,004	151/195	+0.69%
2016	3,626,499	9,908	149/195	−4.45%

== Exits ==
- North: Calzada Ignacio Zaragoza and Calle 1, Colonia Agrícola Oriental
- South: Eje 5 Oriente Avenida Central and Calzada Ignacio Zaragoza, Colonia Agrícola Oriental

== Station layout ==
G	Street Level	Exits/Entrances
G Platforms	Westbound	← toward Pantitlán (Pantitlán)
G Platforms	Island platform, doors will open on the left
G Platforms	Eastbound	toward La Paz (Canal de San Juan)→

== Gallery ==
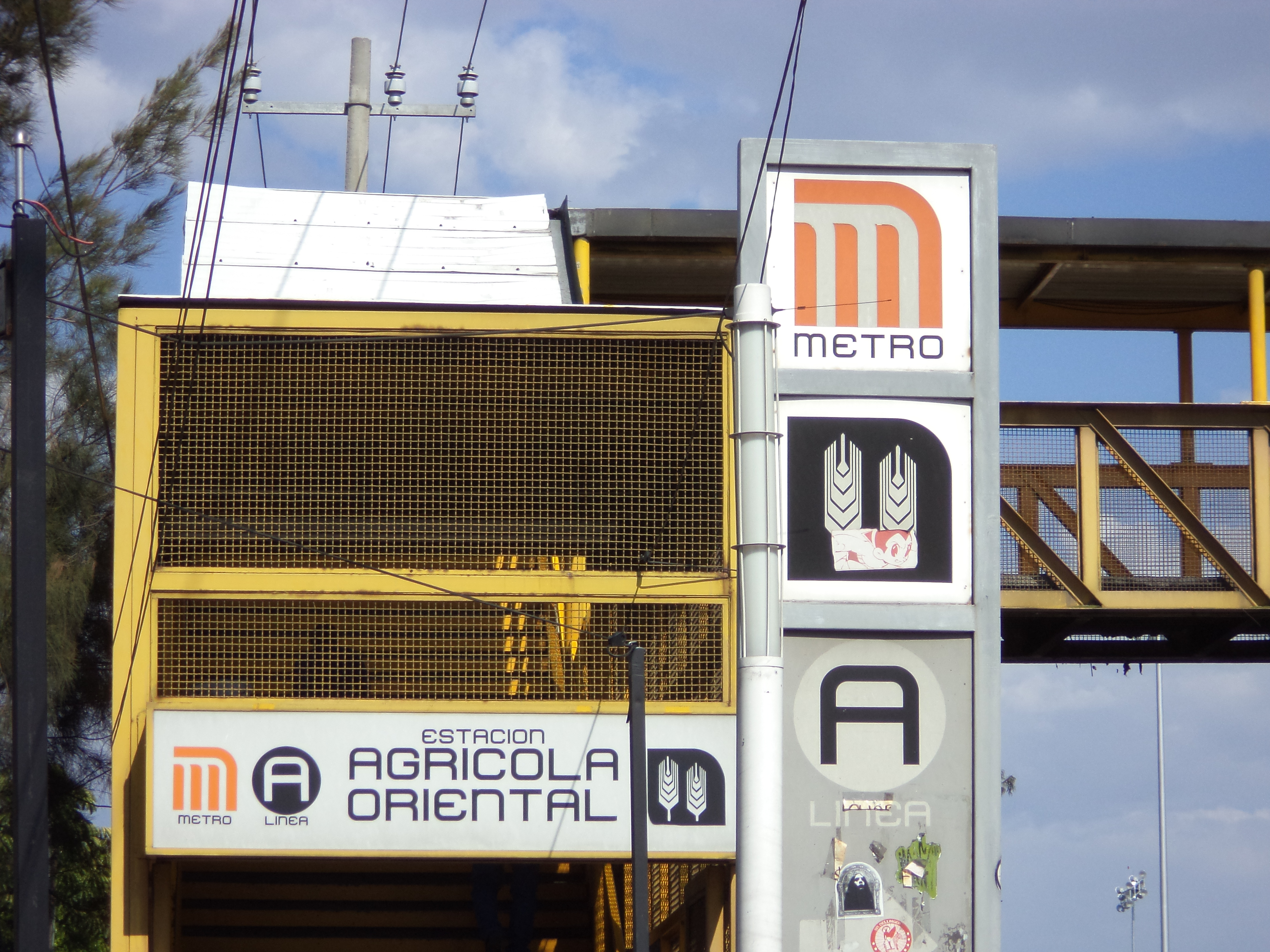
Entry sign
