= Los Reyes metro station =

Mexico City metro station

Los Reyes
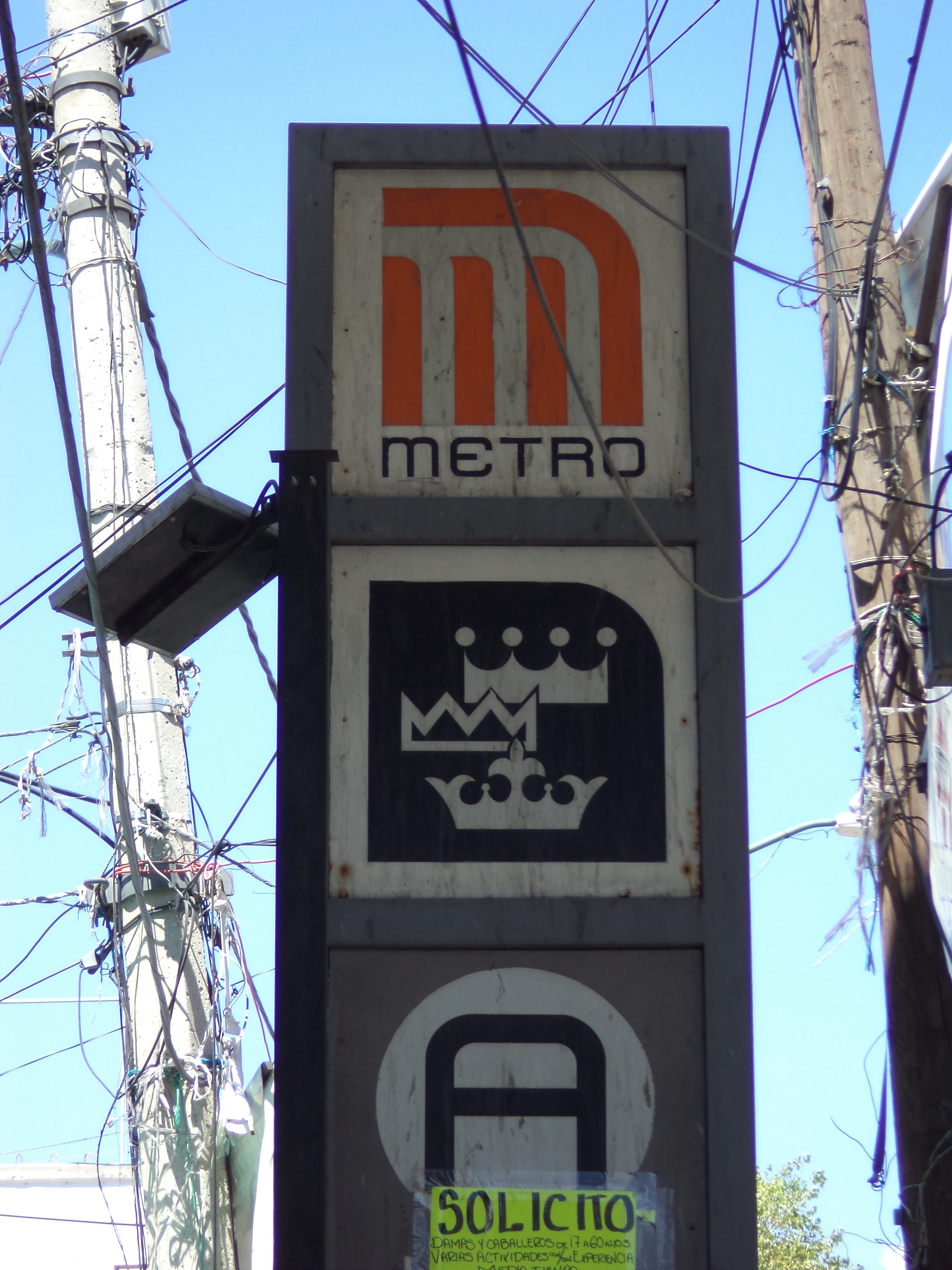

General information
- Location: Puebla Avenue, Porfirio Díaz Street and Pensador Mexicano Street, Los Reyes Acaquilpan, La Paz; State of Mexico; Mexico
- Coordinates: 19°21′32″N 98°58′37″W
- System: Mexico City Metro
- Platforms: 1 island platform
- Tracks: 2

Construction
- Structure type: At grade

History
- Opened: 12 August 1991; 35 years ago

Passengers
- 2025: 6,755,636 (Note: The data here is limited to the most recent ten years to avoid excessive listings; earlier figures can be found in this page's history or on the Mexico City Metro website. To calculate the average daily ridership, the annual total is divided by 365 days (366 in leap years), with decimals omitted from the result. Each station per line is ranked individually, as the system counts transfer stations separately. The percentage change is calculated automatically using the data from the current year and the previous year.) ▲0.84%
- Rank: 61/195

Services
Preceding station	Mexico City Metro	Following station
Santa Marta toward Pantitlán	Line A	La Paz Terminus
Route map
Location
- Location within Mexico City urban area
- Area map

Los Reyes is a street-level station along Line A of the Mexico City Metro. It is located in the Colonia Los Reyes Acaquilpan neighborhood in La Paz municipio in the State of Mexico adjacent to Mexico City.

The station logo depicts three crowns as worn by the Three Wise Men or Kings, since Los Reyes means "The Kings".

== Ridership ==
Annual passenger ridership
Year	Ridership	Average daily	Rank	% change	Ref.
2025	6,755,636	18,508	61/195	+0.84%
2024	6,699,124	18,303	59/195	+7.86%
2023	6,211,147	17,016	71/195	+0.39%
2022	6,187,144	16,951	58/195	+25.02%
2021	4,949,098	13,559	51/195	+5.08%
2020	4,709,642	12,867	68/195	−24.56%
2019	6,242,517	17,102	108/195	+7.10%
2018	5,828,441	15,968	111/195	−13.41%
2017	6,731,039	18,441	93/195	+1.27%
2016	6,646,731	18,160	102/195	+26.10%

== Exits ==
- North: Porfirio Díaz street, Col. Los Reyes Acaquilpan
- South: Pensador Mexicano Juárez, Col. Los Reyes Acaqulpan

== Gallery ==
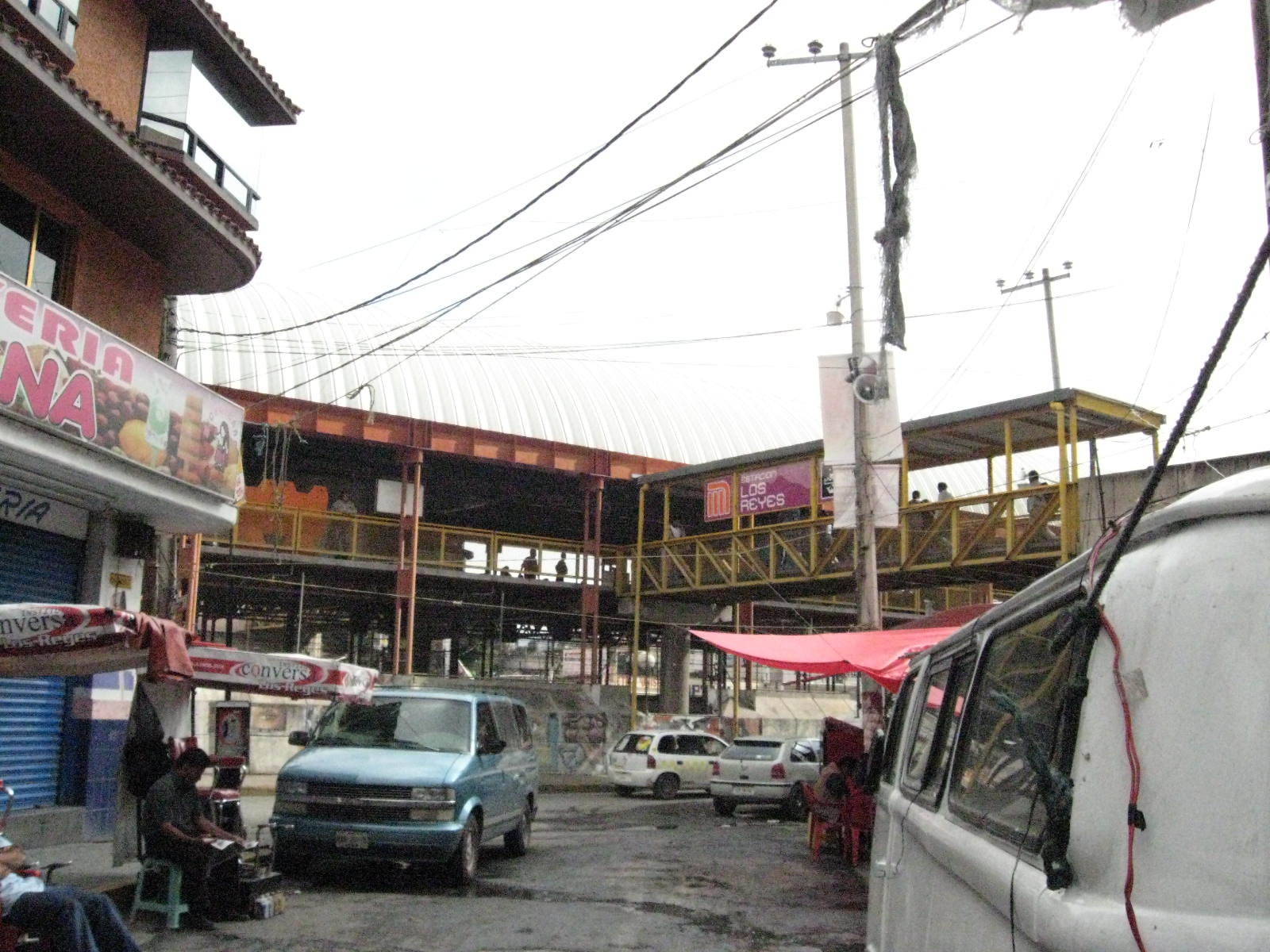
Entrance to the station

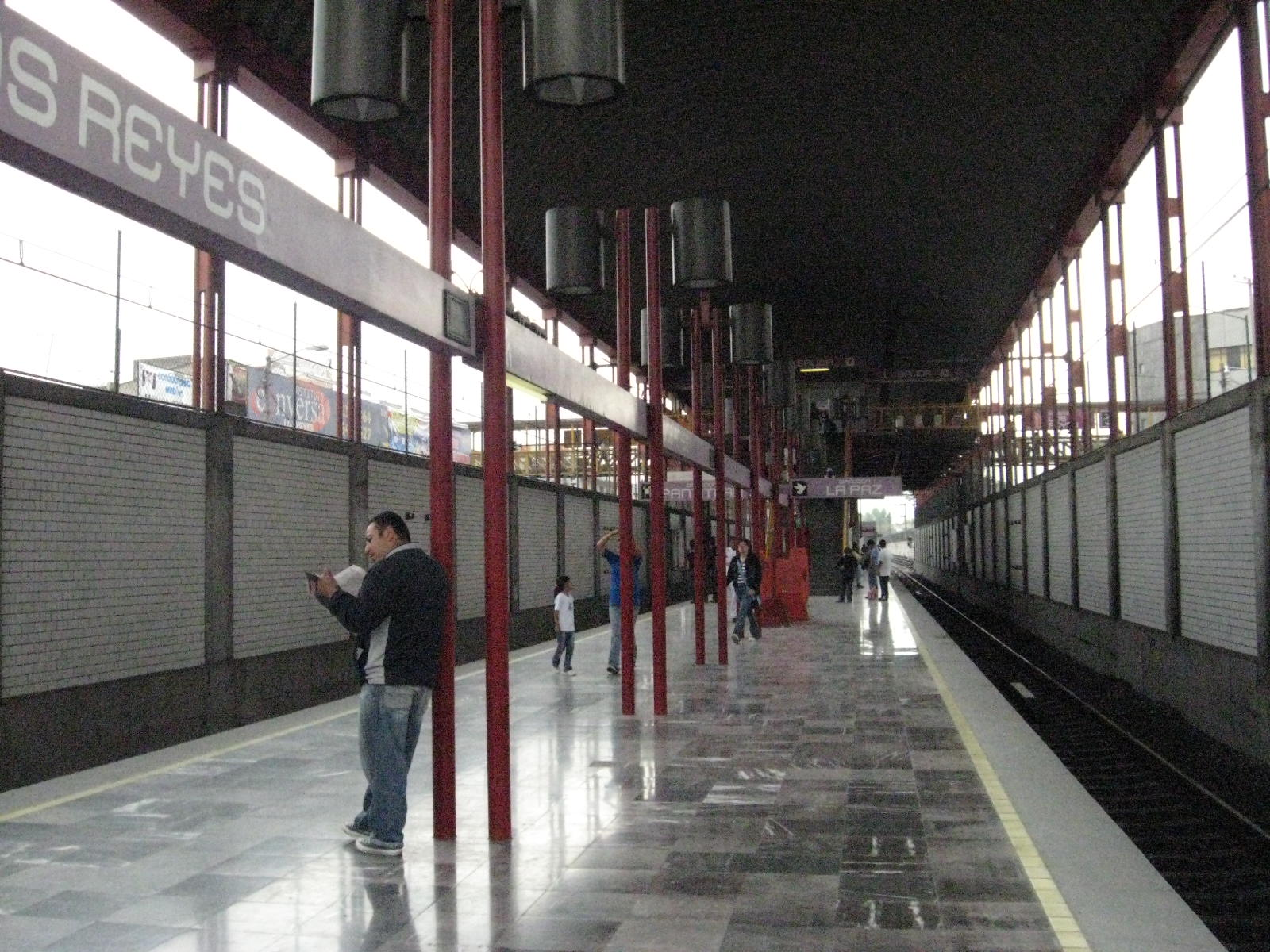
View along platform of Metro station Los Reyes
