= La Paz, State of Mexico =

La Paz
- Municipality
- Coat of arms

- Location of La Paz in the State of Mexico
- Coordinates: 19°21′38″N 98°58′48″W
- Country: Mexico
- State: State of Mexico
- Municipal seat: Los Reyes Acaquilpan
- Municipality Founded: 1875

Government
  - Municipal President: Rolando Castellanos Hernandez (2016-2018)
- Elevation (of seat): 2,260 m (7,410 ft)

Population (2010) Municipality
  - Municipality: 253,845
  - Seat: 85,359
- Time zone: UTC–06:00 (Central)
- Postal code (of seat): 56400
- Website: (in Spanish) www.losreyeslapaz.gob.mx

La Paz is a municipality in the State of Mexico, Mexico, with its municipal seat in the town of Los Reyes Acaquilpan. It is located on the dividing line between Mexico State and the eastern edge of the Federal District and is part of the Greater Mexico City area. The area was part of a region called "Atlicpac" which in Náhuatl means 'above or at the edge of water.' The current city's/municipality's glyph symbolizes water.

== History ==
This area was the land of the Acolhuas whose capital was in Texcoco. As such they were part of the heart of the Aztec Triple Alliance and the Aztec Empire, on the receiving end of tribute coming in from other parts of the empire. This continued until the Spanish conquest of the Aztec Empire. During the colonial period, more specifically in the 18th century, this area was in constant territorial conflict. This ended up with the consolidation of a number of communities into two entities called "San Salvador Tecamachalco" and "La Magdalena Atlicpac" around 1770-1773, now the neighborhoods of Atenantitlan and Tejolote. In 1882, the first railroad connecting the area and Mexico City was built, beginning Los Reyes' close economic ties with the metropolis even though the original town itself would not join the municipality until 1889. Los Reyes achieved city status in 1977.

The municipality was founded in 1875 by President Sebastián Lerdo de Tejada, furthering a process of consolidation of the area that had begun in the prior century. The towns of La Magdalena Atlicpac, San Sebastián Chimalpa and Tecamachalco were unified under the control of La Magdalena Atlicpac. Only later would Los Reyes become the seat.

== Demographics ==
The municipality covers a total surface area of 26.71 square kilometers (10.31 sq mi) and, in the year 2010 census, reported a population of 253,845. It borders with Chicoloapan, Chimalhuacán, Ixtapaluca, Valle de Chalco Solidaridad, Nezahualcoyotl and the Distrito Federal, specifically with the borough of Iztapalapa

The municipality consists of 18 localities (15 urban and 3 rural), of which its municipal seat, Los Reyes Acaquilpan, also known as Los Reyes La Paz, which had a 2010 census population of 85,359 inhabitants, is the largest. Line A of the Mexico City Metro terminates in Los Reyes at the station called Metro La Paz.

=== Towns and villages ===
Localities (cities, towns, and villages) are:

Name	2010 Census Population
Los Reyes Acaquilpan	85,359
San Isidro	33,737
La Magdalena Atlicpac	26,429
Emiliano Zapata	25,309
San Sebastián Chimalpa	12,951
Lomas de San Sebastián	12,372
Professor Carlos Hank González	10,416
El Pino	8,332
San José las Palmas	8,203
Tecamachalco	6,780
Arenal	6,700
Lomas de Altavista	5,704
Unidad Acaquilpan	4,806
Bosques de la Magdalena	2,803
Techachaltitla	1,994
Lomas de San Sebastián	1,447
Colonia Máximo de la Cruz	429
Los Pirules	74
Total Municipality	253,845

== Gallery ==
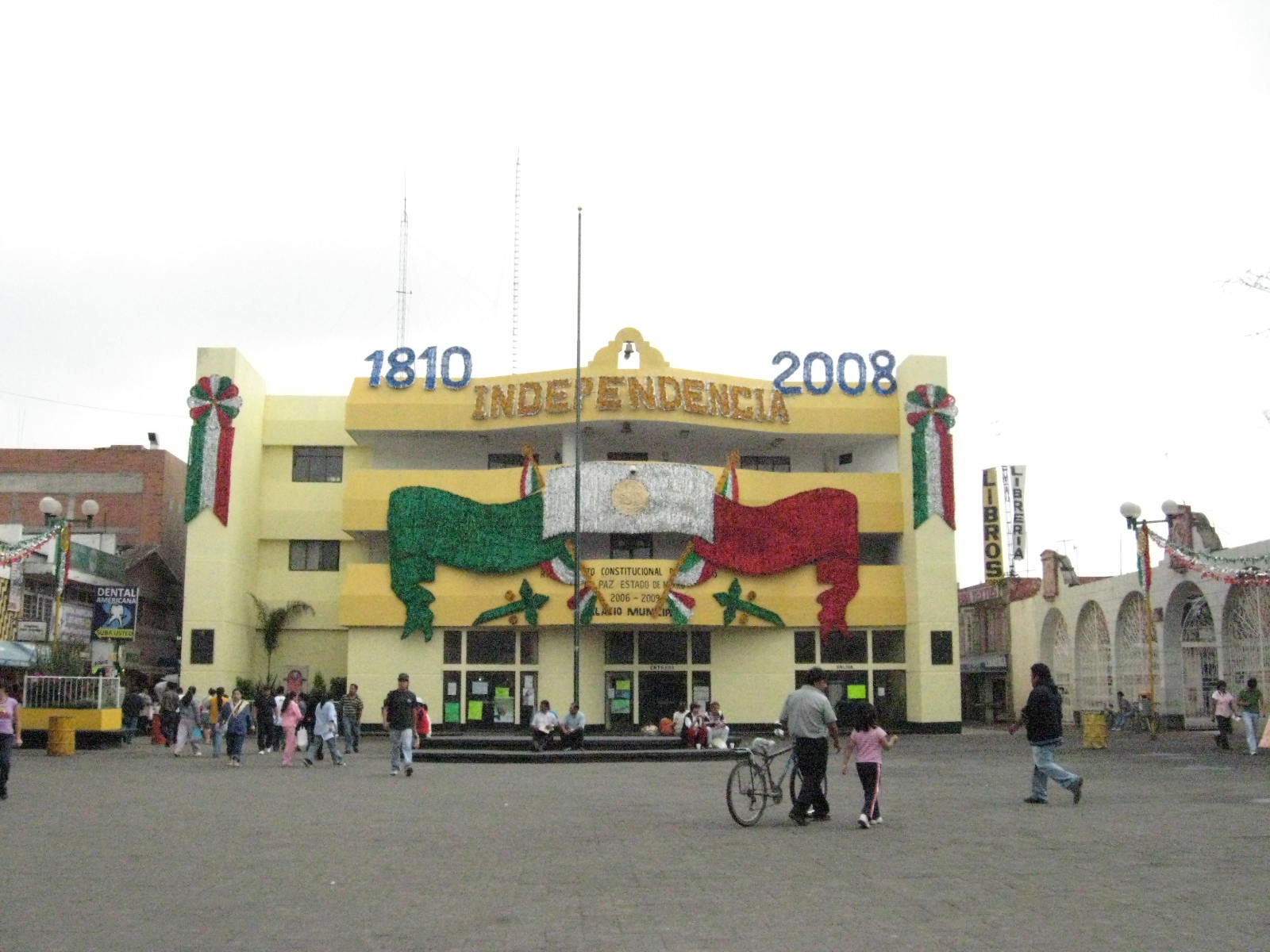
The "municipal palace" or main government building for the city and municipality. It is decorated for the upcoming Independence Day celebrated on Sept 16

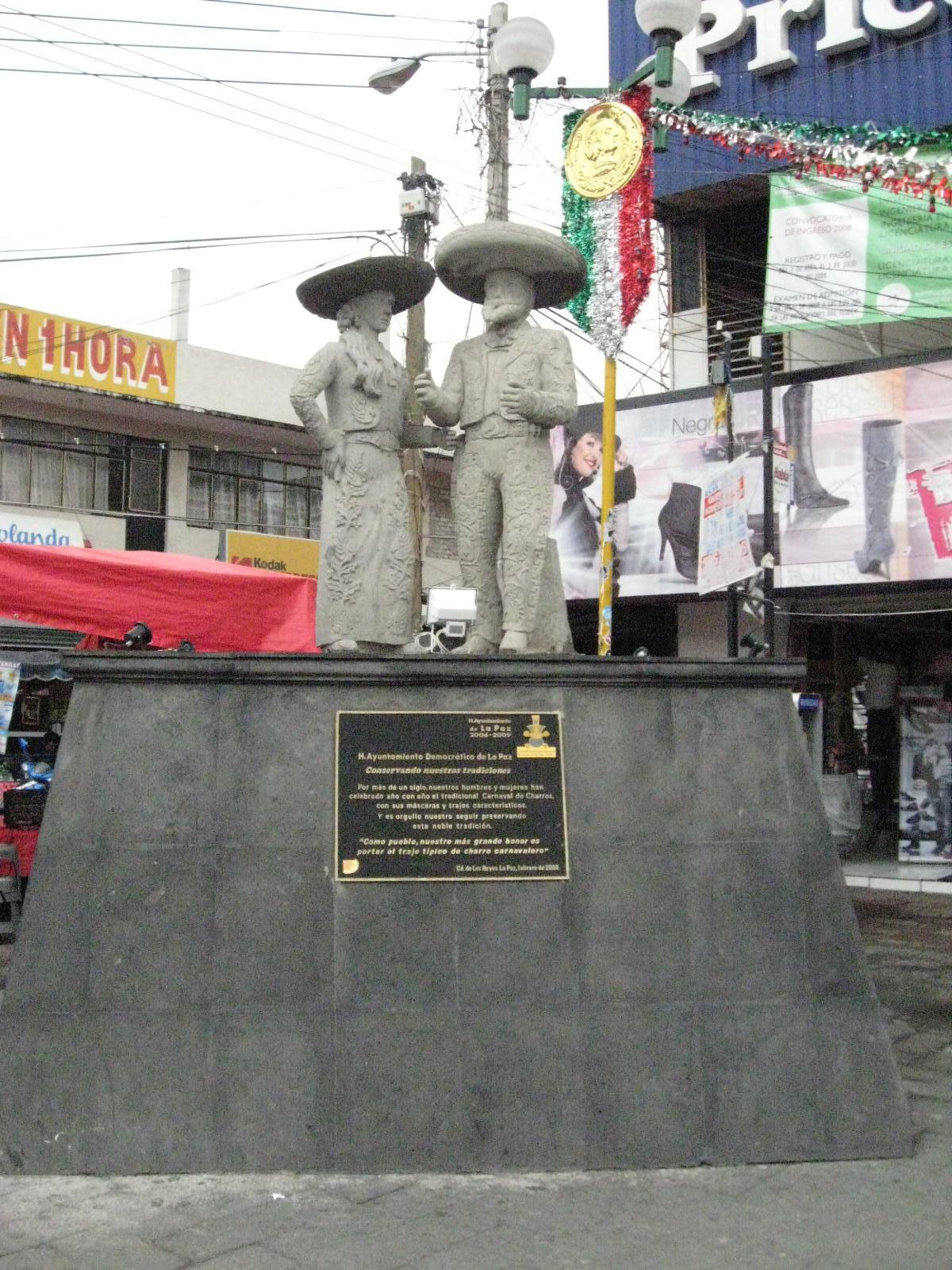
Statue dedicated to charros in the plaza in front of the municipal palace. Part of the inscription reads "For more than a century, our men and women have celebrated the "Carnaval de Charros" with their characteristic masks and outfit year after year and it is our pride to continue preserving this noble tradition"

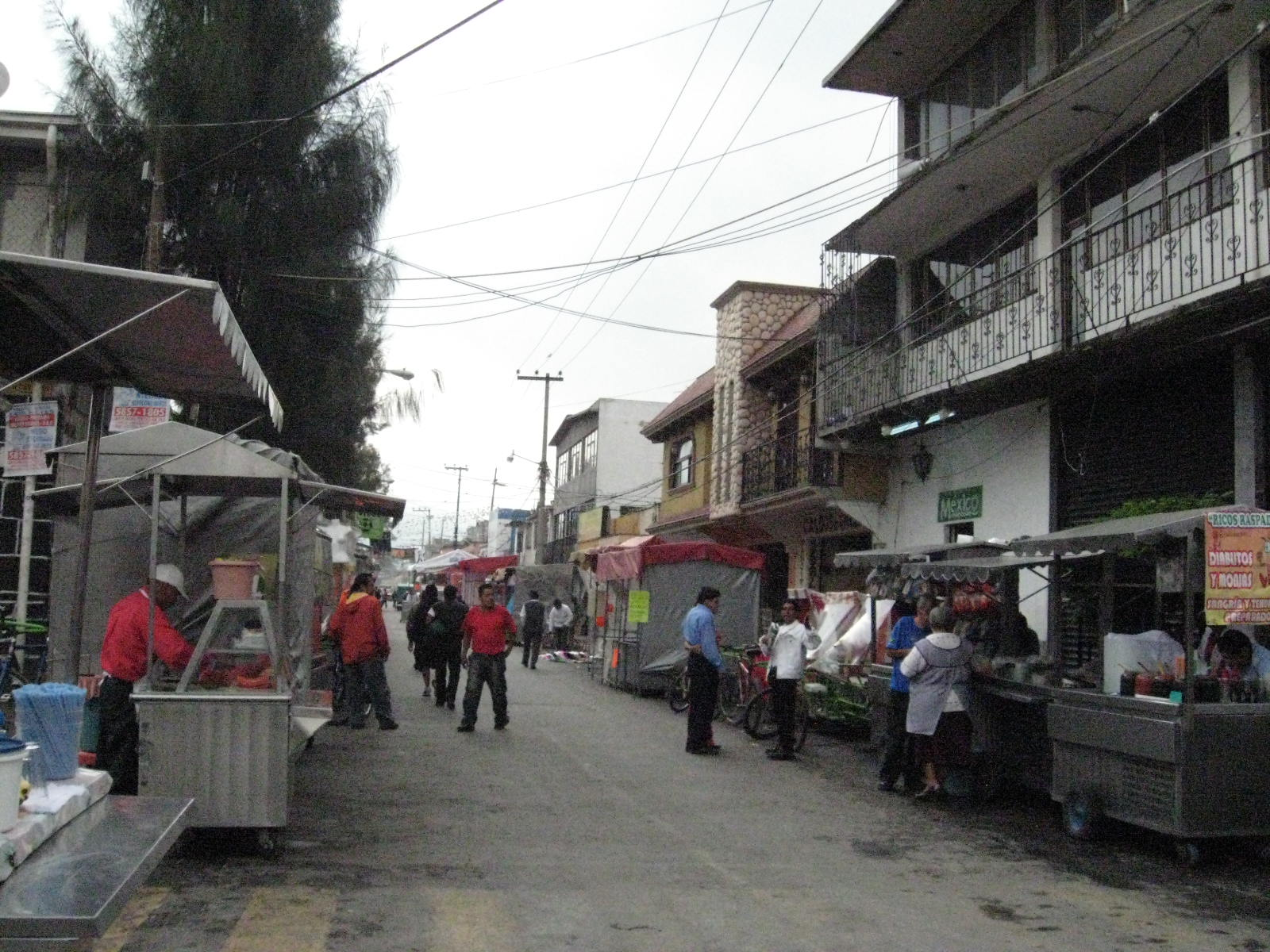
Street vendors on Hombres Ilustres street near the municipal palace

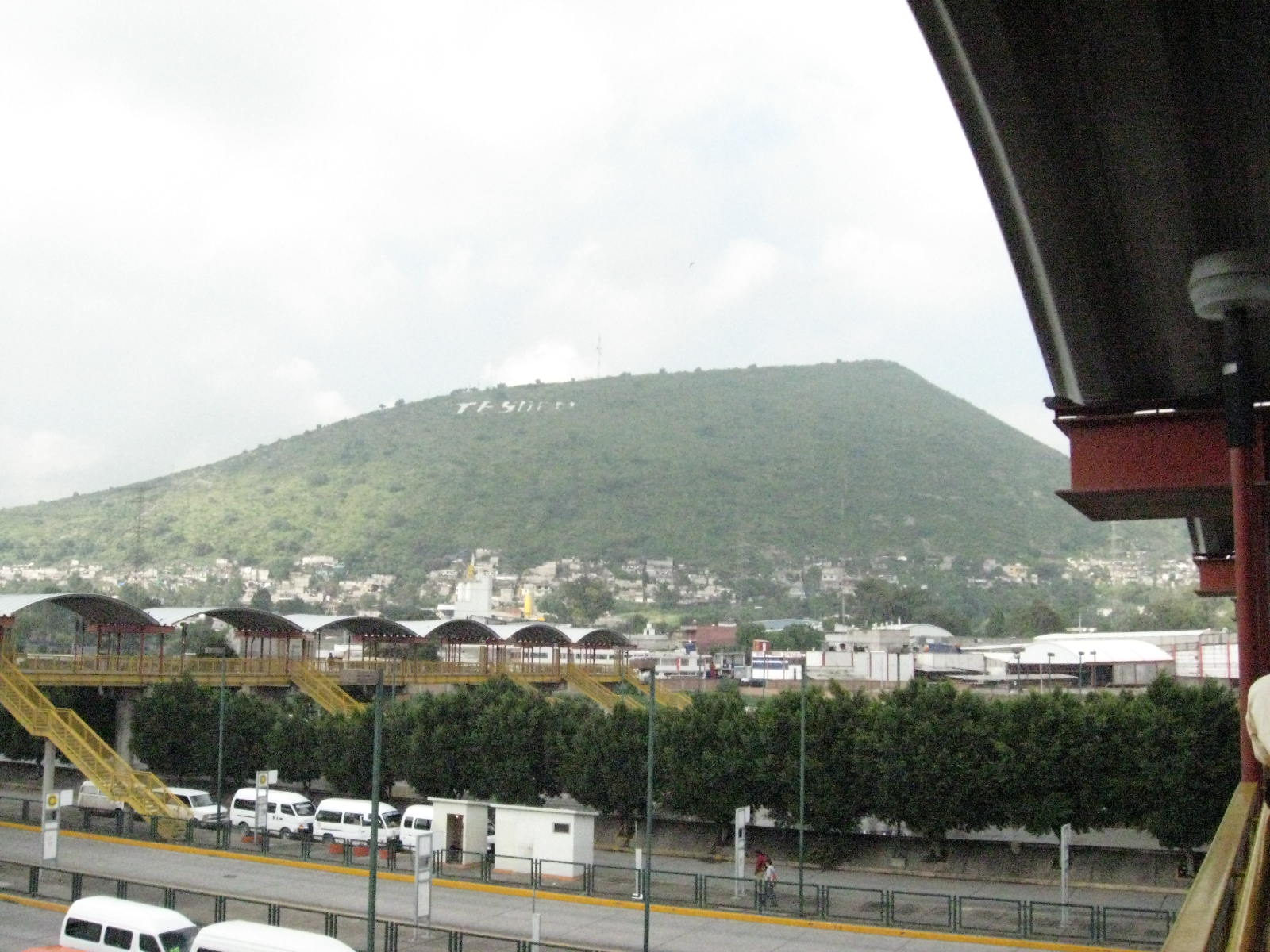
View of (extinct) volcano "La Caldera" taken from the Metro La Paz station of the Mexico City Metro in the city/municipality of Los Reyes Acaquilpan

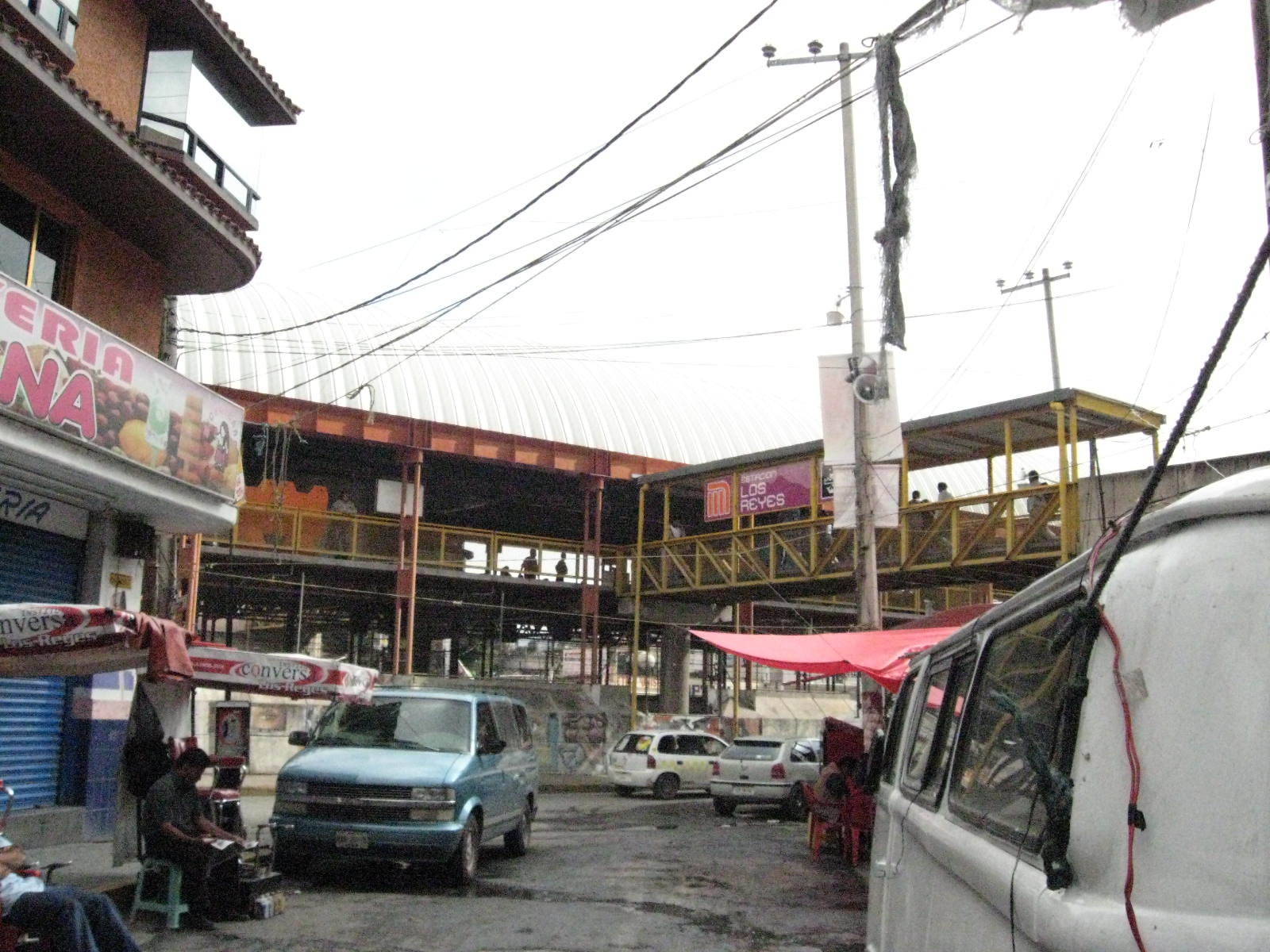
Entrance to Mexico City Metro station Los Reyes

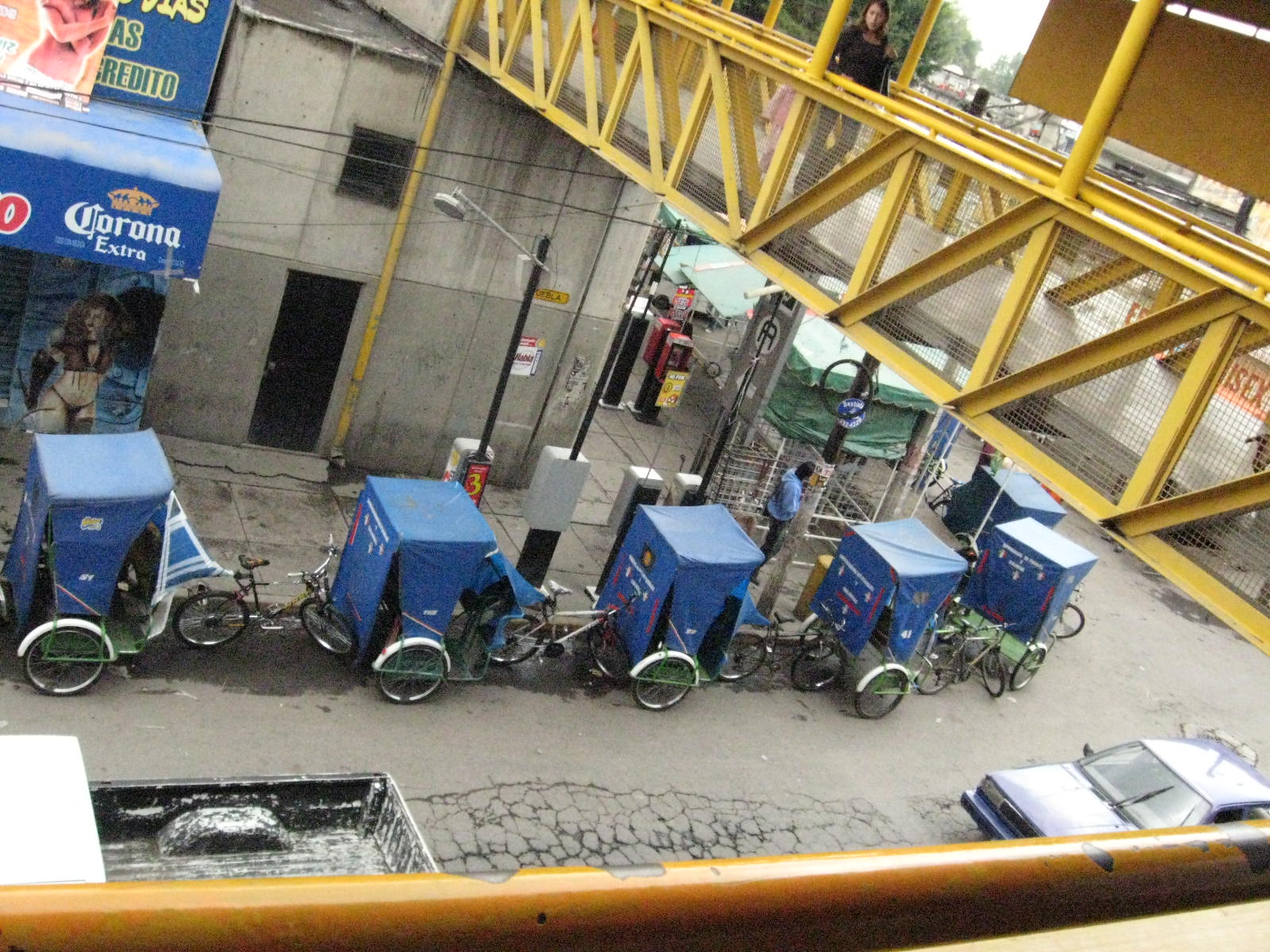
line of bicycle taxis waiting for business on Horacio Zuñiga Street just outside the Metro Los Reyes station
