= La Paz metro station (State of Mexico) =

Mexico City metro station

La Paz
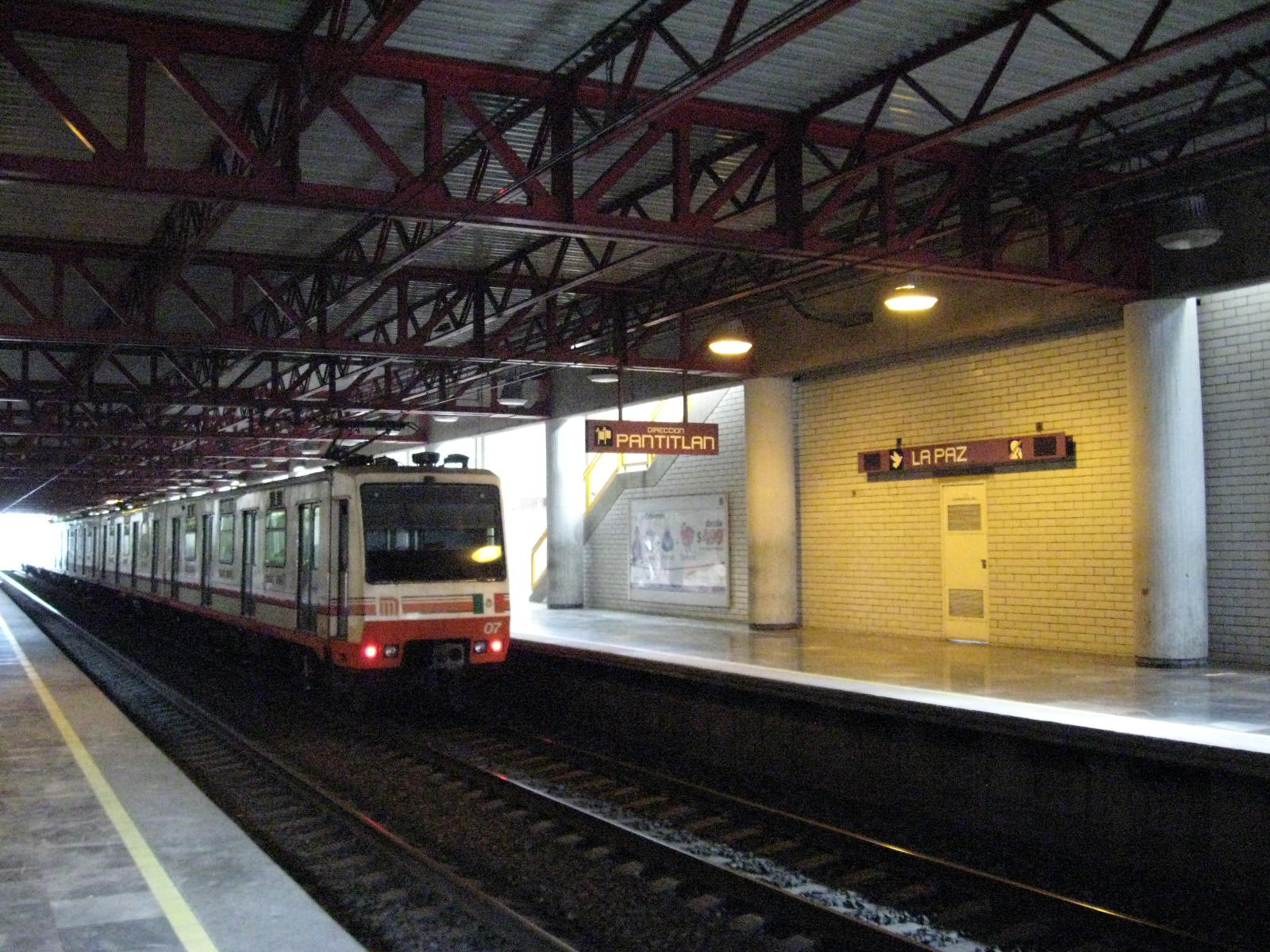
- An FM-86 at the station

General information
- Location: La Paz; State of Mexico; Mexico
- Coordinates: 19°21′02″N 98°57′39″W
- System: Mexico City Metro
- Platforms: 2 side platforms
- Tracks: 2

Construction
- Structure type: At grade

History
- Opened: 12 August 1991; 35 years ago

Passengers
- 2025: 14,258,524 (Note: The data here is limited to the most recent ten years to avoid excessive listings; earlier figures can be found in this page's history or on the Mexico City Metro website. To calculate the average daily ridership, the annual total is divided by 365 days (366 in leap years), with decimals omitted from the result. Each station per line is ranked individually, as the system counts transfer stations separately. The percentage change is calculated automatically using the data from the current year and the previous year.) ▲2.98%
- Rank: 12/195

Services
Preceding station	Mexico City Metro	Following station
Los Reyes toward Pantitlán	Line A	Terminus
Route map
Location
- Location within Mexico City urban area
- Area map

La Paz (Spanish: Estación La Paz) is a Mexico City Metro station that serves Line A. It is the line's terminal station. It opened, along with the other stations along Line A, on 12 August 1991. It is located in Los Reyes Acaquilpan, State of Mexico – a city that is the municipal seat of the La Paz municipality.

The logo for the station is a dove in flight, since La Paz means "Peace".

== Exits ==
- North: Mexico-Puebla Federal Highway, La Paz
- South: Mexico-Puebla Federal Highway, La Paz

== Ridership ==
Annual passenger ridership
Year	Ridership	Average daily	Rank	% change	Ref.
2025	14,258,524	39,064	12/195	+2.98%
2024	13,846,348	37,831	12/195	+4.24%
2023	13,283,545	36,393	13/195	+0.74%
2022	13,185,905	36,125	13/195	+27.13%
2021	10,372,211	28,417	14/195	−0.06%
2020	10,378,387	28,356	16/195	−33.63%
2019	15,636,790	42,840	21/195	+6.18%
2018	14,727,134	40,348	22/195	+6.19%
2017	13,869,132	37,997	23/195	+11.75%
2016	12,410,669	33,908	32/195	+28.45%

== Gallery ==
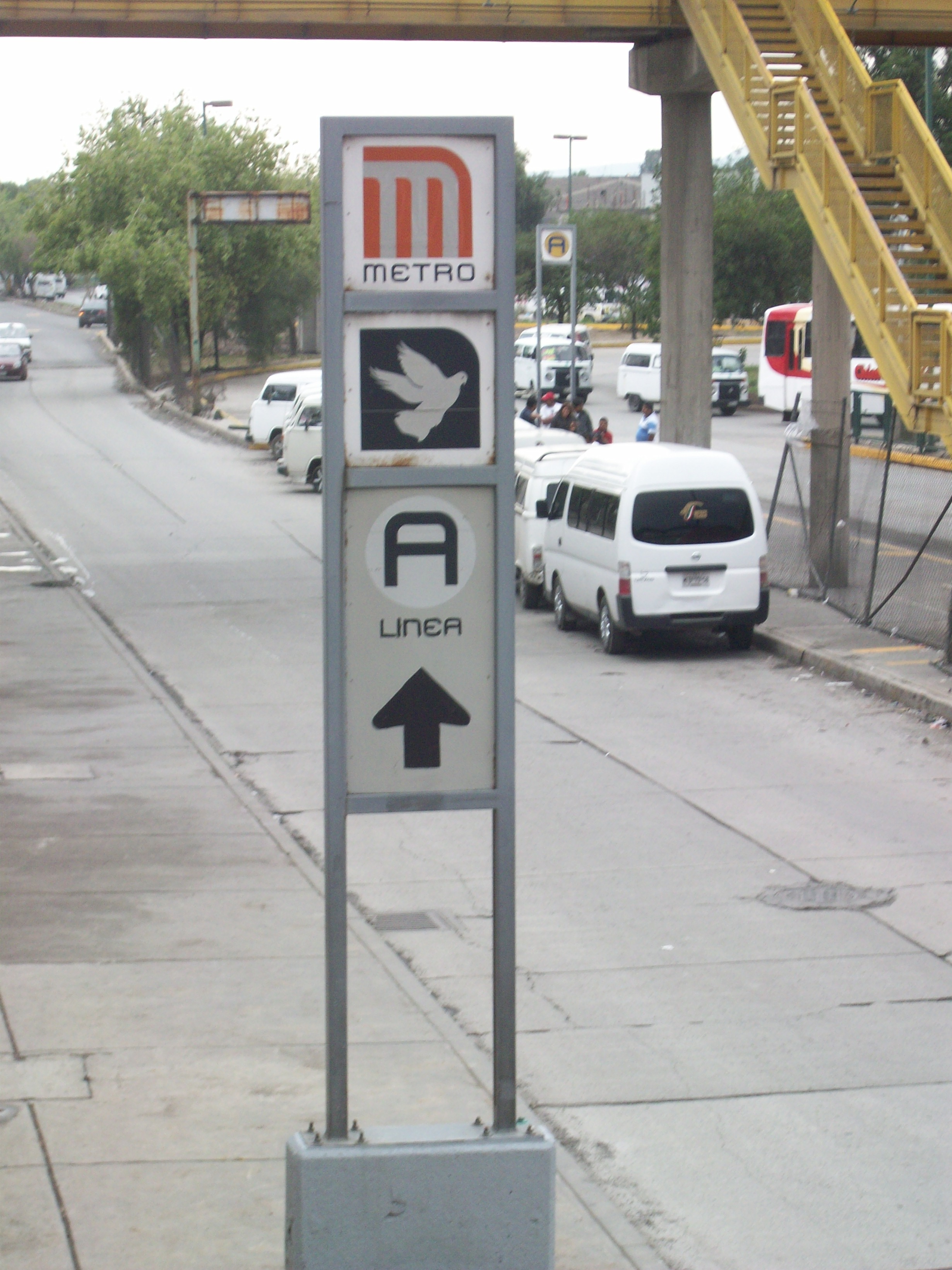
Signs showing logo, tracks and pedestrian bridge are at right

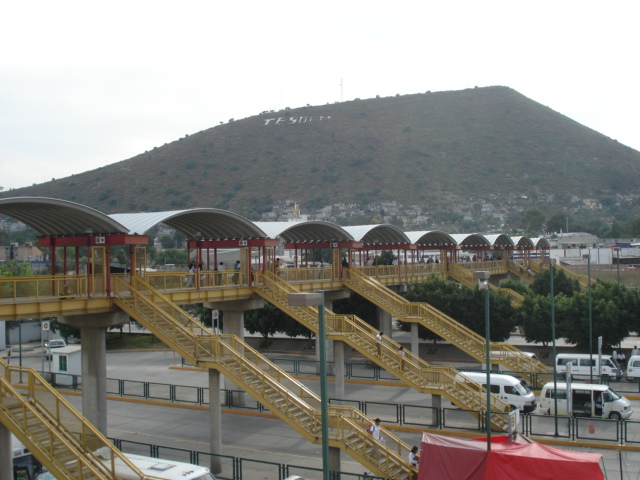
ETRAM at La Paz station
