= List of Mexico City Metro lines =

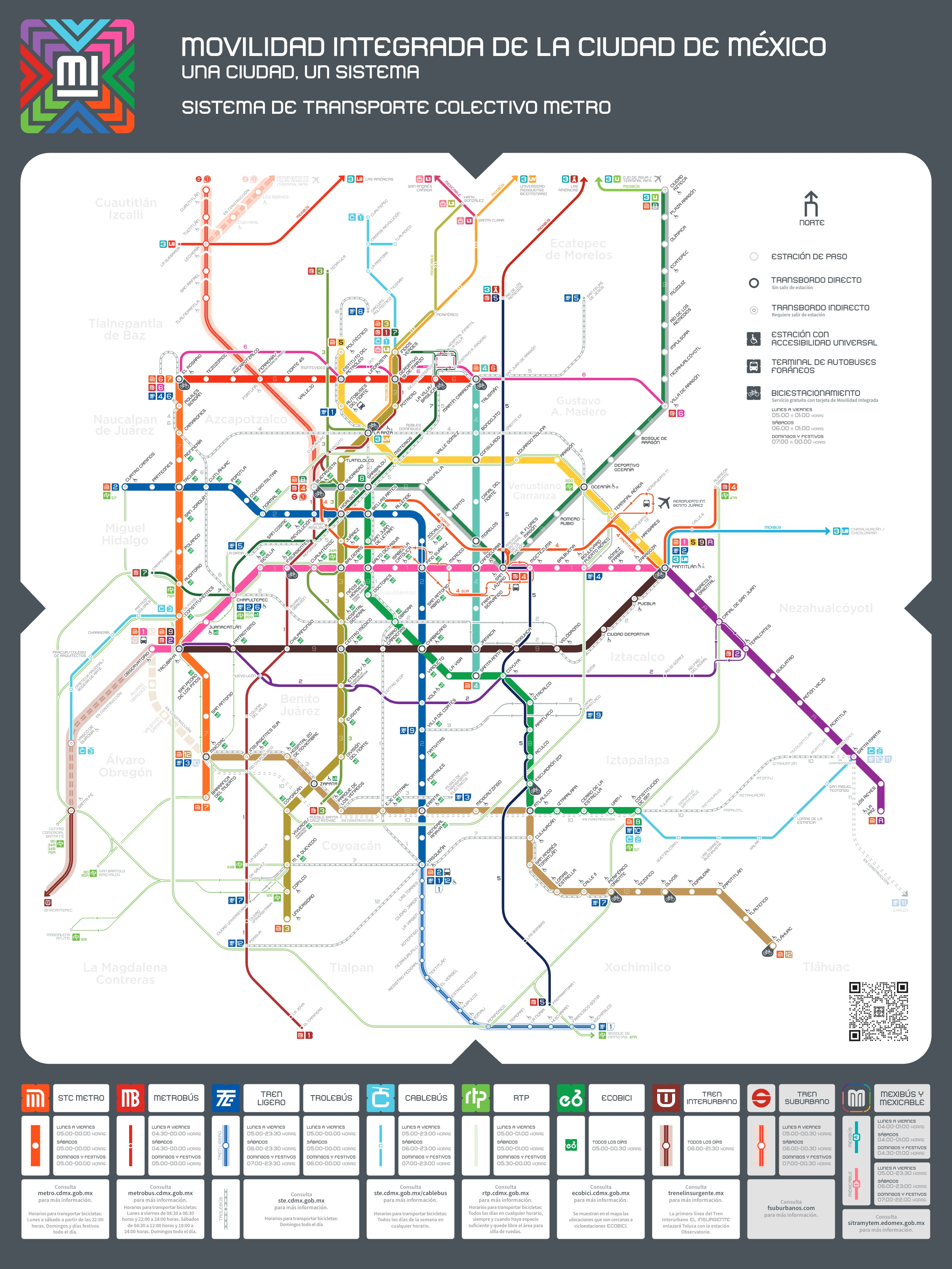
Mexico City Metro system map as of 2024.

The Mexico City Metro is the largest and busiest heavy-rail rapid transit system in Mexico and second in North America, only behind the New York City Subway.

The first line opened on 4 September 1969 with 12.7 kilometres (7.9 mi) of route and 16 stations. The system was last extended in 2015 and now comprises 12 lines, 195 stations, and just over 200 kilometres (124 mi) of route. Ten lines use rubber-tired trains, a technology adopted in part because of Mexico City's unstable soils.

Of the system's 195 stations, 44 serve two or more lines as transfer stations, 115 are underground, 54 are at street-level and 26 are elevated.

Many stations are named after historical figures, places, and events in Mexican history. All lines operate daily from 5 a.m. to midnight.

== Line 1: Observatorio – Pantitlán ==

Line 1's Chapultepec – Zaragoza section was the first of the system to be opened, on September 4, 1969. The line was brought to its current length on August 22, 1984 with its final extension from Zaragoza to Pantitlán.

Line 1 runs mostly in a shallow box-tunnel just a few meters below the street, except for its initial stretch from Observatorio to Tacubaya, where it starts at street-level and progressively goes down to a deep circular tunnel through Tacubaya, where the box-tunnel begins. Line 1 is served by MP-68, NM-83 and NE-92 trains, built in France, Mexico and Spain in 1968, 1983 and 1992, respectively.

Transfer with other Metro lines is available at Tacubaya (lines 7 & 9), Balderas (line 3), Salto del Agua (Line 8), Pino Suárez (line 2), Candelaria (line 4), San Lázaro (line B) and Pantitlán (lines 5, 9 & A). Transfer to the Metrobús bus rapid transit (BRT) system is available at Tacubaya (line 2), Insurgentes (line 1), Cuauhtémoc (line 3), Balderas (line 3), Pino Suárez (line 4) and San Lázaro (lines 4 & 5).

== Line 2: Cuatro Caminos – Tasqueña ==

Line 2 was the second line in the system to open, in 1970. After two expansions, the line has 24 stations, (the most number of stations on a line in the entire metro network), over a total track length of 23.431 km (14.559 mi), of which 20.713 km (12.870 mi) are passenger track. The line has a general northwest–south direction passing through the city center and its color is blue. It starts at the border of the Federal District and the State of Mexico and ends in the city south.

It commutes with line 7 at Tacuba, line 3 at Hidalgo, line 8 at Bellas Artes, line 1 at Pino Suárez, lines 8 and 9 at Chabacano and line 12 at Ermita. At Tasqueña it links with the Mexico City Light Rail to Xochimilco. It used to be served by NC-82 and some NM-83 trains.

Line 2 was the scene of the worst accident in the Mexico City Metro's history on October 20, 1975, when a crash occurred between two trains at Viaducto Station. One train was parked at the station picking up passengers when it was hit by another train that did not stop in time. Twenty people were killed and several wounded. After that accident, automatic traffic lights were installed in all the lines.

Thirteen stations run underground while the remaining ten are surface stations. The line is currently served by NM-02 trains built in Mexico in 2004.

== Line 3: Indios Verdes – Universidad ==

The first section of line 3 was opened in 1970. It has been expanded five times to comprise 21 stations over a total track length of 23.609 km (14.670 mi), of which 21.278 km (13.222 mi) are passenger track, making it the second longest of the system. The line has a general north–south direction passing through the western end of downtown Mexico City and its color is olive green.

It is built under Insurgentes, Guerrero, Zarco, Balderas, Cuauhtémoc, Universidad, Copilco and Delfín Madrigal avenues. It commutes with line 6 at Deportivo 18 de Marzo, line 5 at La Raza, line B at Guerrero, line 2 at Hidalgo, line 1 at Balderas, line 9 at Centro Médico and line 12 at Zapata.

Most of the stations (17) run underground with the remaining four, including both terminals, being surface stations.

Line 3
Line color	olive green
Terminus	Indios Verdes; Universidad
Passenger railway length	21.278 km
Total railway length	23.609 km
Rolling stock	NM-79 trains made in Mexico in 1979
Stations	21
Type of line	Universidad is a superficial terminal. From Copilco to La Raza, underground. From Potrero to Indios Verdes, combines superficial platforms with underground passenger passages.
Direction	North-South, through the city center
Started operations	November 20, 1970: from Tlatelolco to Hospital General; August 25, 1978: from Tlatelolco to La Raza; December 1, 1979: from La Raza to Indios Verdes; June 7, 1980: from Hospital General to Centro Médico; August 25, 1980: from Centro Médico to Zapata; August 30, 1983: from Zapata to Universidad

== Line 4: Santa Anita – Martín Carrera ==

The first section of line 4 was opened in 1981, and it was expanded once to bring the total extension of this line to ten stations over 10.747 km (6.678 mi) of track, of which 9.363 km (5.818 mi) are passenger track. The line has a general north–south direction and is located east of the city center and its color is aqua. It is also the line with the lowest passenger flow, which is why the STC introduced modified 6-wagon trains. In the original blueprint, this line was planned to extend to the north all the way to Ecatepec, Mexico State.

Line 4 is the only one in the system that does not have underground sections. Eight of the ten stations are built on an elevated viaduct and the remaining two are surface stations.

Line 4 connects with line 1 at Candelaria, line 6 at Martín Carrera, line 5 at Consulado, line 8 at Santa Anita, line 9 at Jamaica and line B at Morelos.

Line 4
Line color	aqua
Terminus	Martín Carrera; Santa Anita
Passenger railway length	9.363 km
Total railway length	10.747 km
Rolling stock	Six-wagon trains built in Spain by C.A.F.
Stations	10
Type of line	8 elevated viaduct stations and 2 surface stations
Direction	North-South, on the east side of the city
Started operations	August 29, 1981: from Martín Carrera to Candelaria; May 26, 1982: from Candelaria to Santa Anita

== Line 5: Politécnico – Pantitlán ==

The first section of line 5 was opened in 1981, and it has been expanded twice to bring the total extension of this line to 13 stations over 15.675 km (9.740 mi) of track, of which 14.435 km (8.969 mi) are passenger track. The line has a general north-west to south-east direction relative to the city center and its color is yellow. This line previously had the NM73 trains but due to the introduction of the NM-02 trains in Line 2 now it is served by NC-82 Canadian trains made by Bombardier. Line 5 runs to Mexico City International Airport (Terminal Aérea station).

Line 5 has four underground and nine surface stations. Five stations connect with other metro lines.

Line 5
Line color	yellow
Terminus	Politécnico; Pantitlán
Rolling stock	NC-82 trains made in Canada in 1982
Passenger railway length	14.435 km
Total railway length	15.675 km
Stations	13
Type of line	From Politécnico to La Raza, superficial with underground access. Misterios and Valle Gómez, underground. From Consulado to Oceanía, superficial with underground access Terminal Aérea and Hangares, underground and Pantitlán is superficial.
Direction	Northwest-Southeast
Started operations	December 19, 1981: from Pantitlán to Consulado; July 1, 1982: from Consulado to La Raza; August 30, 1982: from La Raza to Politécnico

== Line 6: El Rosario – Martín Carrera ==

Line 6 had its first section inaugurated in 1983. It has been expanded once to bring the total extension of the line to 11 stations over 13.947 km (8.666 mi) of track, of which 11.434 km (7.105 mi) are passenger track. This line has a west–east direction running north of the city center and its color is scarlet red.

The line has only one surface station, the El Rosario terminal, while the rest of the line runs underground. Four stations connect with other metro lines. Line 6, like line 4, is also served by customized six-car trains.

Line 6
Line color	red
Terminus	El Rosario; Martín Carrera
Passenger railway length	11.434 km
Total railway length	13.947 km
Rolling stock	due to the low volume of persons in the line, the STC introduced six-wagon trains
Stations	11
Type of line	El Rosario is a superficial terminal. From Tezozomoc to Martín Carrera, underground.
Direction	West-East, in the city north
Started operations	December 21, 1983: from El Rosario to Instituto del Petróleo; July 8, 1986: from Instituto del Petróleo to Martín Carrera

== Line 7: El Rosario – Barranca del Muerto ==

The first section of line 7 was opened to the public in 1984. It has been expanded three times to bring the total length of the line to 14 stations over 18.784 km (11.672 mi) of track, of which 17.011 km (10.570 mi) are passenger track. Line 7 has a north–south direction running west of the city center and its color is orange.

The line has its only surface station in the El Rosario terminal. The rest of the line runs underground, with some sections being located more than 20 m below street level, making it the deepest line in the system at a maximum of 36 meters. Three stations connect with other metro lines.

This line used MP-68 trains and a small number of NM-73, after the rehabilitation of some MP-68. They kept circulating on this line although there is a slightly bigger number of NM-79 and NM-83 in this line. Today there are only retro adapted NM-73 and NM-83 models and some trains from the first model due to the introduction of the NM-02 in the Line 2. Currently the MP-68 trains from Line 9 are being reintroduced.

Line 7
Line color	orange
Terminus	El Rosario; Barranca del Muerto
Passenger railway length	17.011 km
Total railway length	18.784 km
Stations	14
Type of line	El Rosario is a surface terminal. From Aquiles Serdán to Barranca del Muerto, stations are underground.
Direction	North-South, at the city west
Started operations	December 20, 1984: from Tacuba to Auditorio; August 22, 1985: from Auditorio to Tacubaya; December 19, 1985: from Tacubaya to Barranca; December 29, 1988: from Tacuba to El Rosario

== Line 8: Garibaldi / Lagunilla – Constitución de 1917 ==

Line 8 was the next to last route of the network to be opened, on July 20, 1994 by then President Carlos Salinas de Gortari and then regent of the city, Manuel Aguilera Gómez. Construction plans for the line date back to much earlier, but they were put on hold due to significant redevelopment. It has 19 stations over a total track length of 20.078 km (12.476 mi), of which 16.679 km (10.364 mi) are passenger track. Line 8 runs in a general south-east direction, beginning near the city center, and its color is bright green. The line has 14 underground stations and five surface stations, including the southern terminal Constitución de 1917. Six stations connect line 8 with other metro lines. According to the Sistema de Transporte Colectivo, the volume of people moved in this line was 117,386,342 persons in 2006.

Line 8
Line color	Green
Terminus	Garibaldi/Lagunilla; Constitución de 1917
Passenger railway length	16.679 km
Total railway length:	20.078 km
Rolling stock	MP-82 trains made in France between 1982 and 1984
Stations	19
Direction	Center-Southeast
Started operations	July 20, 1994

== Line 9: Tacubaya – Pantitlán ==

The first section of line 9 was opened to the public in 1987. It has been expanded once to a length of 12 stations over 15.375 km (9.554 mi) of track, of which 13.033 km (8.098 mi) are passenger track. The line was opened to relieve passenger traffic from line 1, to which it runs parallel south of the city center. The color of the line is dark brown.

Line 9 has eight underground stations with the remaining being elevated stations similar to those in line 4, including the terminal Pantitlán. It is the only line in the system in which no section of the track runs at street-level. Additionally, five stations connect with other metro lines. The trains of this line are made up from MP68 trains rehabilitated with fans and intelligent control systems and some NM-79 rolling stock.

Some of the stations were the set for the 1990 film Total Recall.

Line 9
Line color	brown
Terminus	Tacubaya; Pantitlán
Passenger railway length	13.033 km
Total railway length	15.375 km
Station	12
Direction	West-East, through the city center
Started operations	August 26, 1987: from Pantitlán to Centro Médico; August 29, 1988: from Centro Médico to Tacubaya

== Line A: Pantitlán – La Paz ==

Line A was the second metro line that extended into the suburbs of Mexico City outside the Mexican Federal District. Opened in its entirety in 1991, it comprises ten stations over 17.192 kilometres (10.683 mi) of track, of which 14.893 kilometres (9.254 mi) are passenger track. Line A runs in a general south-east direction, east of the city center, and its color is purple.

Line A has only one underground station, the terminal Pantitlán, while the rest of the line runs at street-level, sometimes going underground between stations. Only one station makes connections with other metro lines.

Until Line 12's opening, 21 years later (in 2012), line A was unique within the system in its use of traditional rail traction (steel-wheeled rolling stock) as opposed to pneumatic traction (rubber-tyred rolling stock). Because it was the first line of this type in the metro system, it was called the Metro Férreo and sometimes continues to be referred to by that name. The line is served by FM-86 trains, built in Mexico by Concarril in 1986, and FM-95A trains, also built in Mexico (by Bombardier) between 1998 and 1999, which draw electricity through a pantograph. And also FE-07 CAF trains that were made in 2009.

Line A
Line color	purple
Terminus	Pantitlán; La Paz
Passenger railway length	14.893 km
Total railway length	23.722 km
Rolling stock	FM-86 trains, made in Mexico in 1986; FM-95A, made in Mexico in 1998 and 1999; FE-07, made in Spain in 2009
Type of line	Pantitlán is an underground terminal. From Agrícola Oriental to La Paz, stations are surfaced.
Stations	10
Direction	Northwest-southeast
Started operations	August 12, 1991: From Pantitlán to La Paz

== Line B: Buenavista – Ciudad Azteca ==

Line B became the third line to extend into the suburbs of Mexico City, and into the State of Mexico. The first section of the line was opened in 1999 and was expanded once to comprise a total of 21 stations over 23.722 km (14.740 mi) of track, of which 20.278 km (12.600 mi) are passenger track. Line B starts north of the city center and runs in a general north-east direction relative to it. Its color is green and silver.

Six stations of line B run under ground, four are elevated and 11 run at street-level. Five stations connect with other metro lines.

All the trains are MP68 modified and equipped with GPS and intelligent control system, the trains in this line were the leftovers from Line 1 that were rehabilitated by Bombardier-Concarril.

Line B
Line color	Green/grey
Terminus	Ciudad Azteca; Buenavista
Passenger railway length	20.278 km
Total railway length	23.722 km
Stations	21
Direction	Southwest through the City Center-Far Northeast
Started operations	December 15, 1999: from Buenavista to Villa de Aragón; November 30, 2000: from Villa de Aragón to Ciudad Azteca

== Line 12: Mixcoac – Tláhuac ==

Construction of line 12 began after a public consultation, on August 8, 2007, and inaugurated on October 30, 2012. Although the line offered full service during the first 16 months of operation (Mixcoac – Tláhuac), the service over the eleven easternmost stations was suspended indefinitely due to structural failures, with provisional terminal being Atlalilco as of October 2014. For the 18 months of the repair works, Line 12 ran from Mixcoac to Atlalilco, (9 stations), 4 of them linking with other lines, as well as with the Mexico City Metrobús.

According to the Mexico City Metro website, line 12 trains use traditional rail traction (as line A). Government nicknamed it the línea del Bicentenario, commemorating the 200th anniversary of the beginning of Mexican War of Independence on September 16, 1810 and promising to deliver all twenty stations by April 30, 2012. However, delays on train deliveries and construction caused full operation was delayed to October 30, 2012. At that date, President Calderón and Mayor Marcelo Ebrard opened the line to service.

In March 2014, 11 stations had to be closed because of security risks for the passengers because of rail corrugation. An investigation determined rails were incompatible with the trains, accusations of corruption arose. After 18 months line was repaired and resumed service.

On the night of May 3, 2021, an elevated portion collapsed causing 26 deaths and 70 injuries.

Line 12
Line color	gold
Terminus	Mixcoac; Tláhuac
Passenger railway length	24 km
Rolling stock	FE-10 made in 2011 by CAF
Stations	20
Direction	South-East
Started operations	October 30, 2012

== See also ==
- Servicio de Transportes Eléctricos
