= Talismán metro station =

Mexico City metro station

Talismán
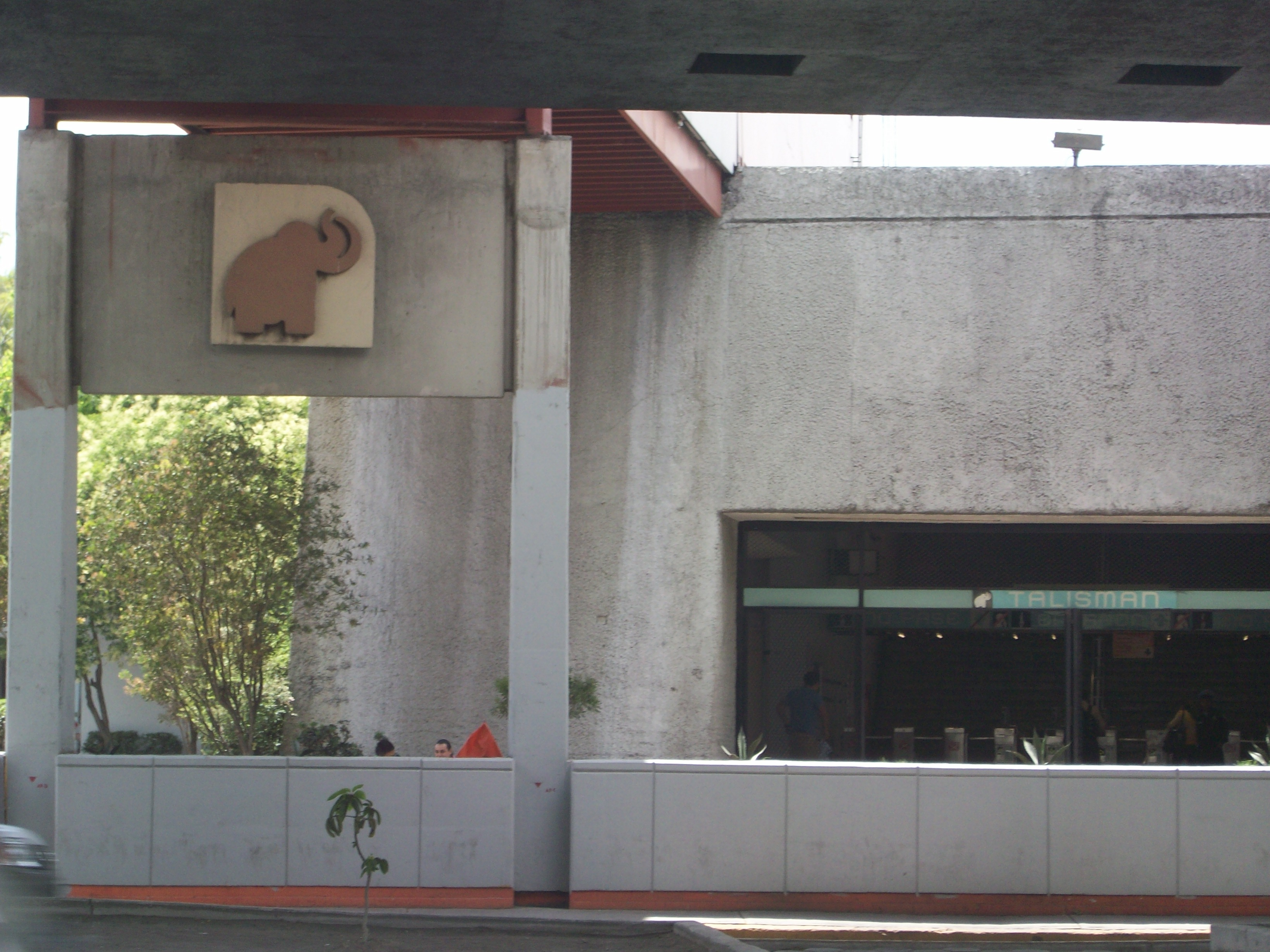

General information
- Location: Av. Congreso de la Unión; Gustavo A. Madero; Mexico City; Mexico
- Coordinates: 19°28′27″N 99°06′29″W
- System: Mexico City Metro
- Operator: Sistema de Transporte Colectivo (STC)
- Platforms: 2 side platforms
- Tracks: 2

Construction
- Structure type: Elevated
- Platform levels: 1
- Parking: No
- Cycle facilities: No

Other information
- Status: In service

History
- Opened: 29 August 1981; 44 years ago

Passengers
- 2025: 1,090,897 (Note: The data here is limited to the most recent ten years to avoid excessive listings; earlier figures can be found in this page's history or on the Mexico City Metro website. To calculate the average daily ridership, the annual total is divided by 365 days (366 in leap years), with decimals omitted from the result. Each station per line is ranked individually, as the system counts transfer stations separately. The percentage change is calculated automatically using the data from the current year and the previous year.) ▼2.02%
- Rank: 190/195

Services
Preceding station	Mexico City Metro	Following station
Martín Carrera Terminus	Line 4	Bondojito toward Santa Anita
Route map
Location
- Location within Mexico City
- Area map

Talismán is a station along Line 4 of the Mexico City Metro, located in Gustavo A. Madero borough.

== General information ==
The station logo depicts a stylised image of a mammoth, with raised trunk and tusks. During the construction of this station, the fossilised remains of a mammoth (Mammuthus meridionalis) were dug up by an excavation crew. The fossil is now exhibited in a display in the station. The station was opened on 29 August 1981.

Talismán also means "amulet", and an elephant with a raised trunk is considered a good luck symbol.

This metro station, like others on Line 4, stands on Avenida Congreso de la Unión.

The western exit is on the same block as Procter & Gamble Mexico's Talismán Plant, where soap products including Camay and Safeguard are produced. Trucks delivering tallow and olive oil (raw materials for soap) are a common sight around the station.

Talisman is served by several Pesero routes to Potrero, Tepito and Merced. It is also served by RTP Bus services on Avenida Congreso de la Unión.

From 23 April to 14 June 2020, the station was temporarily closed due to the COVID-19 pandemic in Mexico.

=== Ridership ===
Annual passenger ridership
Year	Ridership	Average daily	Rank	% change	Ref.
2025	1,090,897	2,988	190/195	−2.02%
2024	1,113,424	3,042	183/195	−4.59%
2023	1,167,027	3,197	174/195	−0.67%
2022	1,174,910	3,218	170/195	+31.17%
2021	895,738	2,454	181/195	−6.67%
2020	959,769	2,622	187/195	−51.18%
2019	1,965,881	5,385	186/195	−2.69%
2018	2,020,237	5,534	185/195	−0.54%
2017	2,031,195	5,564	182/195	−3.18%
2016	2,097,842	5,731	181/195	−7.86%

== Exits ==
- East: Avenida Congreso de la Unión and Oriente 171 street, Colonia Ampliación Aragón
- West: Avenida Congreso de la Unión and Avenida Talismán, Colonia Granjas Modernas
