= Consulado metro station =

Mexico City Metro station

Consulado
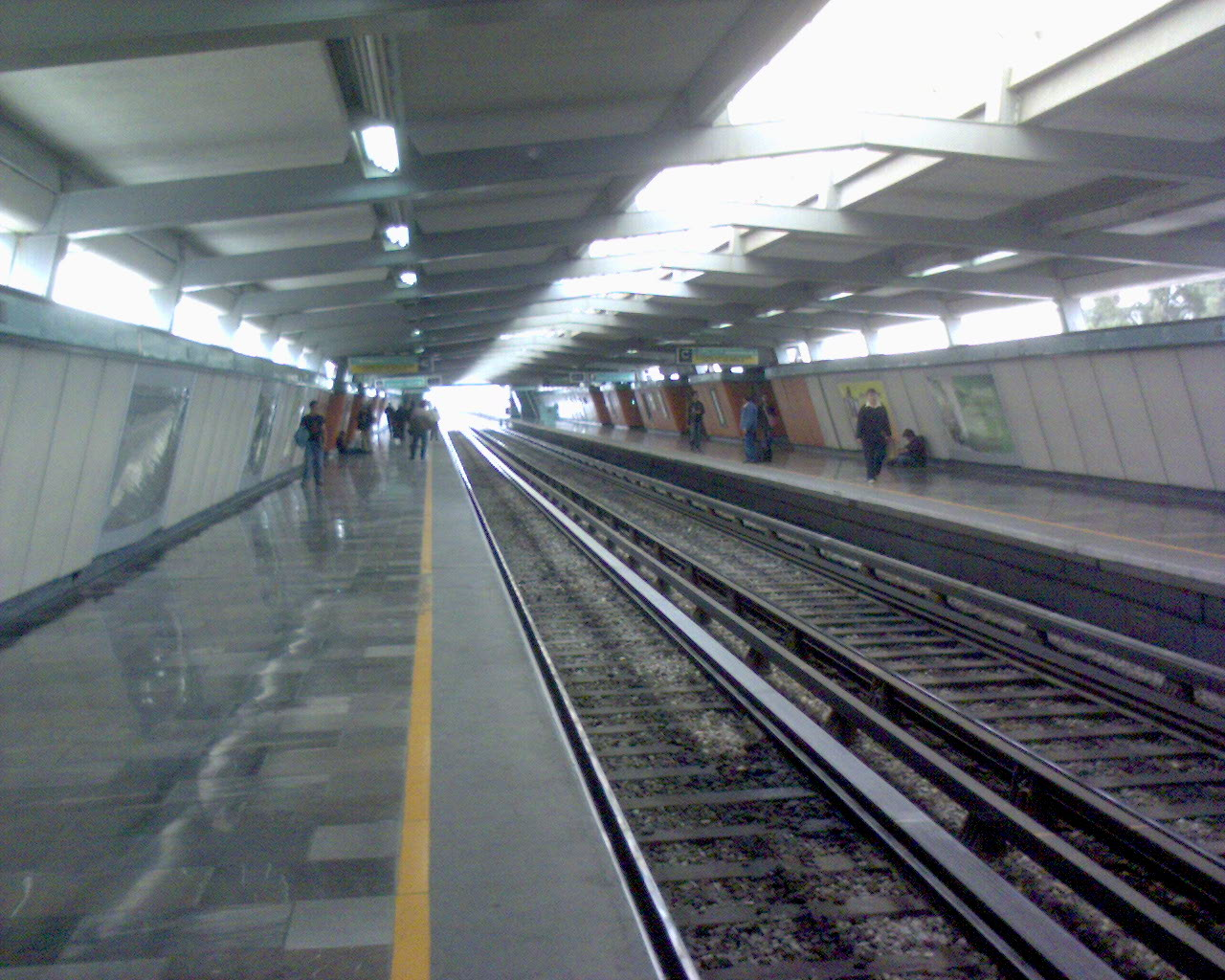
- Line 4 platforms, 2006

General information
- Location: Río Consulado Avenue and Congreso de la Unión Avenue; Gustavo A. Madero and Venustiano Carranza, Mexico City; Mexico
- Coordinates: 19°27′28″N 99°06′50″W
- System: Mexico City Metro
- Owner: Government of Mexico City
- Operator: Sistema de Transporte Colectivo (STC)
- Platforms: 4 side platforms (2 per line)
- Tracks: 4 (2 per line)
- Connections: Río Consulado; Routes: 37, 200; Routes: 5-A, 20-A, 20-B

Construction
- Structure type: Elevated; At grade

Other information
- Status: In service

History
- Opened: 29 August 1981; 45 years ago; 19 December 1981; 44 years ago

Passengers
- 2025: 2,667,795 (Note: The Mexico City Metro system counts the entries from interchange stations separately. Individually, Line 4 saw 1,142,918 passengers, while Line 5 recorded 1,524,877 passengers.) (Note: The system's website counts only passenger entries into stations and does not include passengers passing through, transferring between lines, or exiting the station. The data here is limited to the most recent ten years to avoid excessive listings; earlier figures can be found in this page's history or on the Mexico City Metro website. To calculate the average daily ridership, the annual total is divided by 365 days (366 in leap years), with decimals omitted from the result. Each station per line is ranked individually, as the system counts transfer stations separately. The percentage change is calculated automatically using the data from the current year and the previous year.) ▼5.03%
- Rank: 189/195; 184/195

Services
Preceding station	Mexico City Metro	Following station
Bondojito toward Martín Carrera	Line 4	Canal del Norte toward Santa Anita
Valle Gómez toward Politécnico	Line 5	Eduardo Molina toward Pantitlán
Route map
Location
- Location within Mexico City
- Area map and exits

Consulado metro station (Note: Estación del Metro Consulado. Spanish pronunciation: [konsuˈlaðo]. The name of the station literally means "Consulate" in Spanish.) is a transfer station on the Mexico City Metro in Gustavo A. Madero and Venustiano Carranza, Mexico City. Consulado is a combined elevated and at-grade station divided into two lines. It serves Lines 4 (Teal Line) and 5 (Yellow Line), each with two side platforms. Consulado metro station is located between Bondojito and Canal del Norte stations on Line 4, and between Valle Gómez and Eduardo Molina stations on Line 5. The stop serves the Colonias (neighborhoods) of 7 de Noviembre, 20 de Noviembre, Felipe Ángeles, and Mártires de Río Blanco. The Line 5 building is situated along Circuito Interior Avenue.

Consulado metro station opened on Line 4 on 29 August 1981 as part of the inaugurated service from Martín Carrera to Candelaria. Service on Line 5 began on 19 December 1981 as the temporary western terminal of the line. The pictogram representing Consulado metro station depicts a water duct, symbolizing the ducted part of the river of the same name that runs below the station. Inside the metro stop, there is a cultural display.

In 2025, Consulado served 2,667,795 passenger entries, making it one of the least-accessed transfer stations in the system and one of the least-used stations on either of its lines.

== Location and layout ==
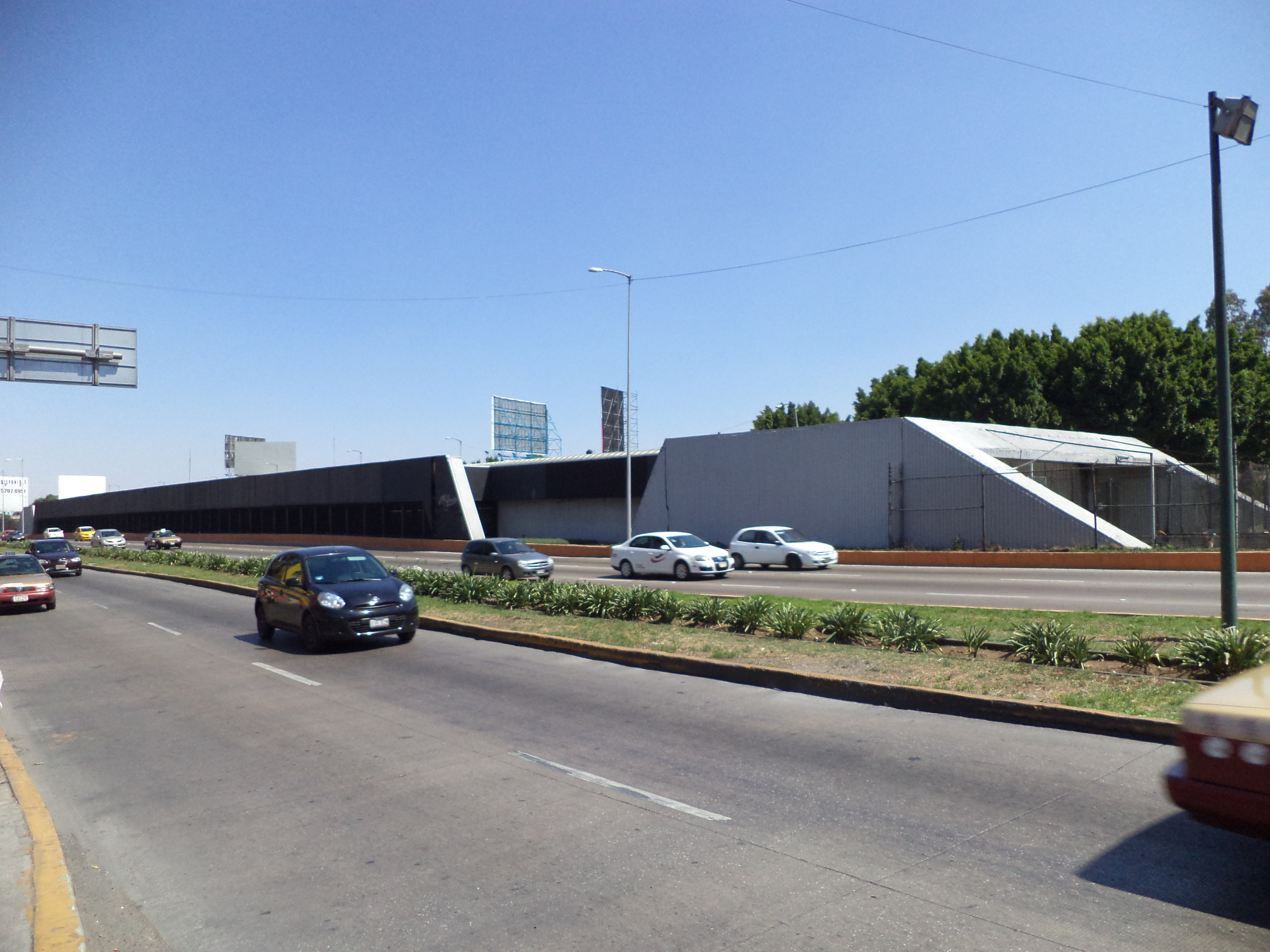
Line 5 platforms (pictured) lie along Río Consolado Avenue.

Consulado is a transfer metro station, located in the Colonias (neighborhoods) of 7 de Noviembre and Mártires de Río Blanco, in Gustavo A. Madero borough, northern Mexico City, and 20 de Noviembre and Felipe Ángeles, in Venustiano Carranza borough, to the city's northeastern. The stop is situated above Avenida Congreso de la Unión (Line 4), and along the median strip of Circuito Interior, in the section named Avenida Río Consulado (Line 5).

Within the system, it is followed by Bondojito and Canal del Norte stations on Line 4 and Valle Gómez and Eduardo Molina stations on Line 5. The station has four exits. On Line 4, the eastern and western exits provide access to Avenida Congreso de la Unión at Calle Oriente 87 in Colonia 20 de Noviembre and Calle Oriente 85 in Colonia Mártires de Río Blanco, respectively. On Line 5, the northern and southern exits provide access to Calle Norte 64-A and Avenida Río Consulado in Colonia 7 de Noviembre, and Calle Cuarzo and Avenida Río Consulado in Colonia Felipe Ángeles, respectively.

The area is serviced by Line 5 of the Metrobús system at Río Consulado station, a few blocks away. Routes 5-A, 20-A, and 20-B of the city's public bus system and Routes 37 and 200 of the Red de Transporte de Pasajeros network service the station's area.

Inside Consulado metro station, there is a cultural showcase. The passenger transfer tunnel that connects both lines is approximately 400 meters (1,300 ft) long.

== History and construction ==
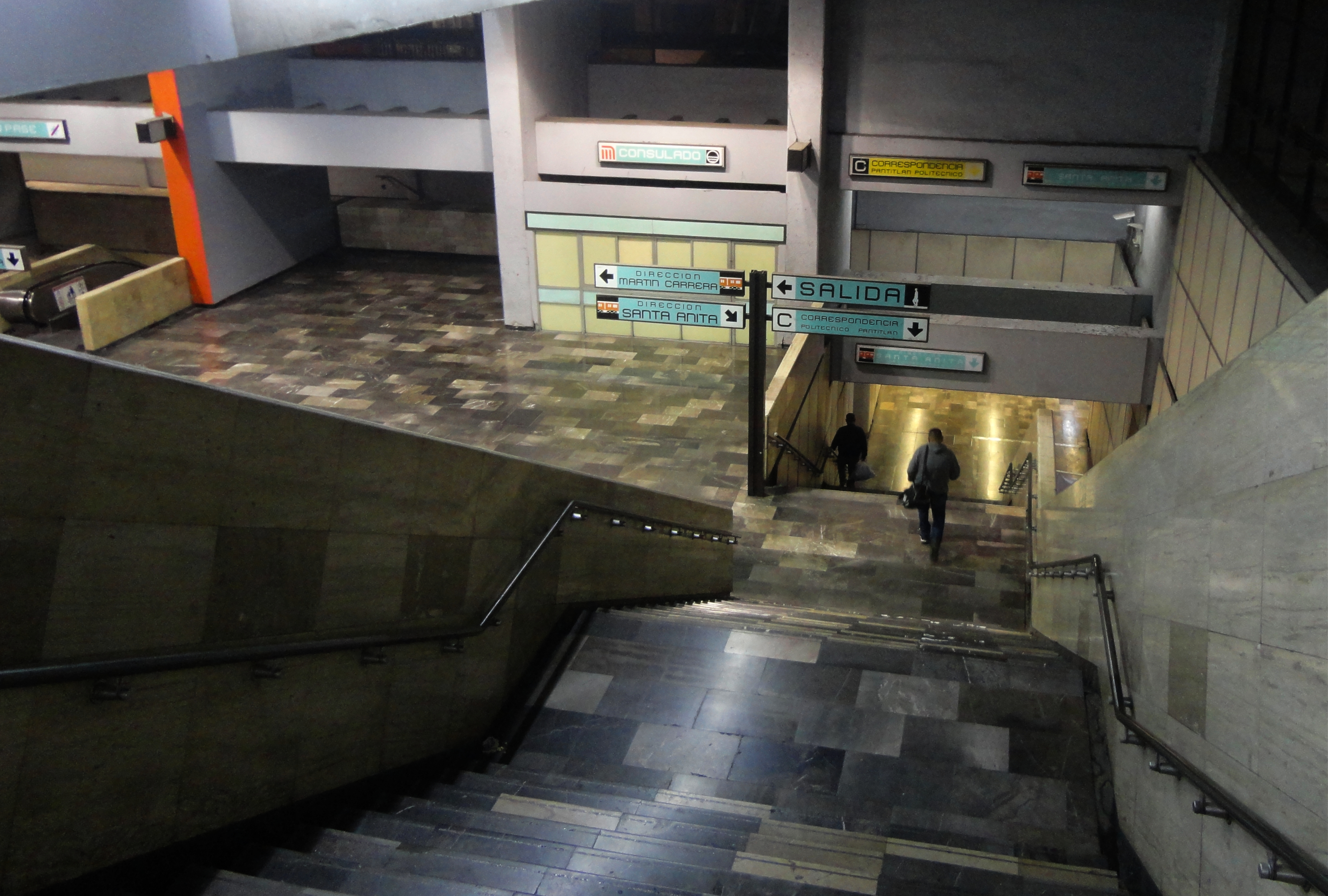
Signaling as seen from the Line 4 platforms

=== Name and pictogram ===
The station's pictogram depicts a water duct, symbolizing the section of the Consulado River that runs beneath the station, which flows from Sierra de las Cruces to Lake Texcoco.

=== Line 4 ===
The station was built Cometro, a subsidiary of Empresas ICA. It was opened on 29 August 1981, providing service northward toward Martín Carrera station and southward toward Candelaria station station.

The line's bridge between Consulado and Bondojito is 892 meters (2,927 ft) long, while the opposite section toward Canal del Norte measures 884 meters (2,900 ft).

=== Line 5 ===
The station was built by Empresas ICA. It opened on 19 December 1981, as the line's western terminus station, providing eastern service toward Pantitlán station. Northwestern service toward La Raza started on 1 July 1982.

The interstation section between Consulado and Valle Gómez stations is 679 m (2,228 ft), going from the street level to the underground one. The section toward Eduardo Molina is 815 meters (2,674 ft) long.

=== Incidents ===
According to the system authorities, the section between Consulado and Valle Gómez stations is a common site of copper wire theft, which could potentially cause fires on the tracks.

On 31 July 2018, three railroad cars uncoupled while a train was traveling between the Consulado and Eduardo Molina interstation, with no injuries reported. Upon investigation, authorities discovered that the nuts securing the cars were damaged. Following the collapse of the elevated railway near Olivos station on Line 12 in May 2021, users reported structural damage to other elevated stations, including Consulado station. Mexico City's head of government, Claudia Sheinbaum, said that the reports would be examined accordingly.

== Ridership ==
Daily ridership for Line 4 in 2024

Daily ridership for Line 5 in 2024

According to official data, Line 5 records higher entries than Line 4, and both are among the least accessed in the system. Prior to the impact of the COVID-19 pandemic, Consulado metro station recorded a total ridership of 3,408,299 passengers in 2019, averaging 9,337 daily entries.

The station's total ridership for 2025 was 2,667,795 passengers, with a daily average of 7,309 entries. By line, Line 4 recorded 1,142,918 passengers, averaging 3,131 per day. Line 5 recorded 1,524,877 passengers, averaging 4,177. In the same year, when considered individually among the system's 195 stations, the Line 4 station ranked 189th busiest, while the Line 5 station ranked 184th.

Annual passenger ridership (Line 4)
Year	Ridership	Average daily	Rank	% change	Ref.
2025	1,142,918	3,131	189/195	+0.11%	
2024	1,141,658	3,119	182/195	+0.92%	
2023	1,131,202	3,099	175/195	+7.21%	
2022	1,055,140	2,890	172/195	+39.33%	
2021	757,318	2,074	185/195	−14.44%	
2020	885,105	2,418	188/195	−44.98%	
2019	1,608,777	4,407	190/195	−0.98%	
2018	1,624,724	4,451	190/195	+2.20%	
2017	1,589,728	4,355	190/195	+0.22%	
2016	1,586,182	4,333	189/195	−2.38%	

Annual passenger ridership (Line 5)
Year	Ridership	Average daily	Rank	% change	Ref.
2025	1,524,877	4,177	184/195	−8.56%	
2024	1,667,574	4,556	174/195	−1.15%	
2023	1,686,931	4,621	166/195	+9.76%	
2022	1,536,917	4,210	166/195	+26.61%	
2021	1,213,863	3,325	165/195	−5.27%	
2020	1,281,437	3,501	178/195	−28.79%	
2019	1,799,522	4,930	187/195	−0.36%	
2018	1,806,039	4,948	188/195	+1.67%	
2017	1,776,427	4,866	187/195	−1.51%	
2016	1,803,613	4,927	187/195	−3.67%	
