= Fray Servando metro station =

Mexico City metro station

Fray Servando
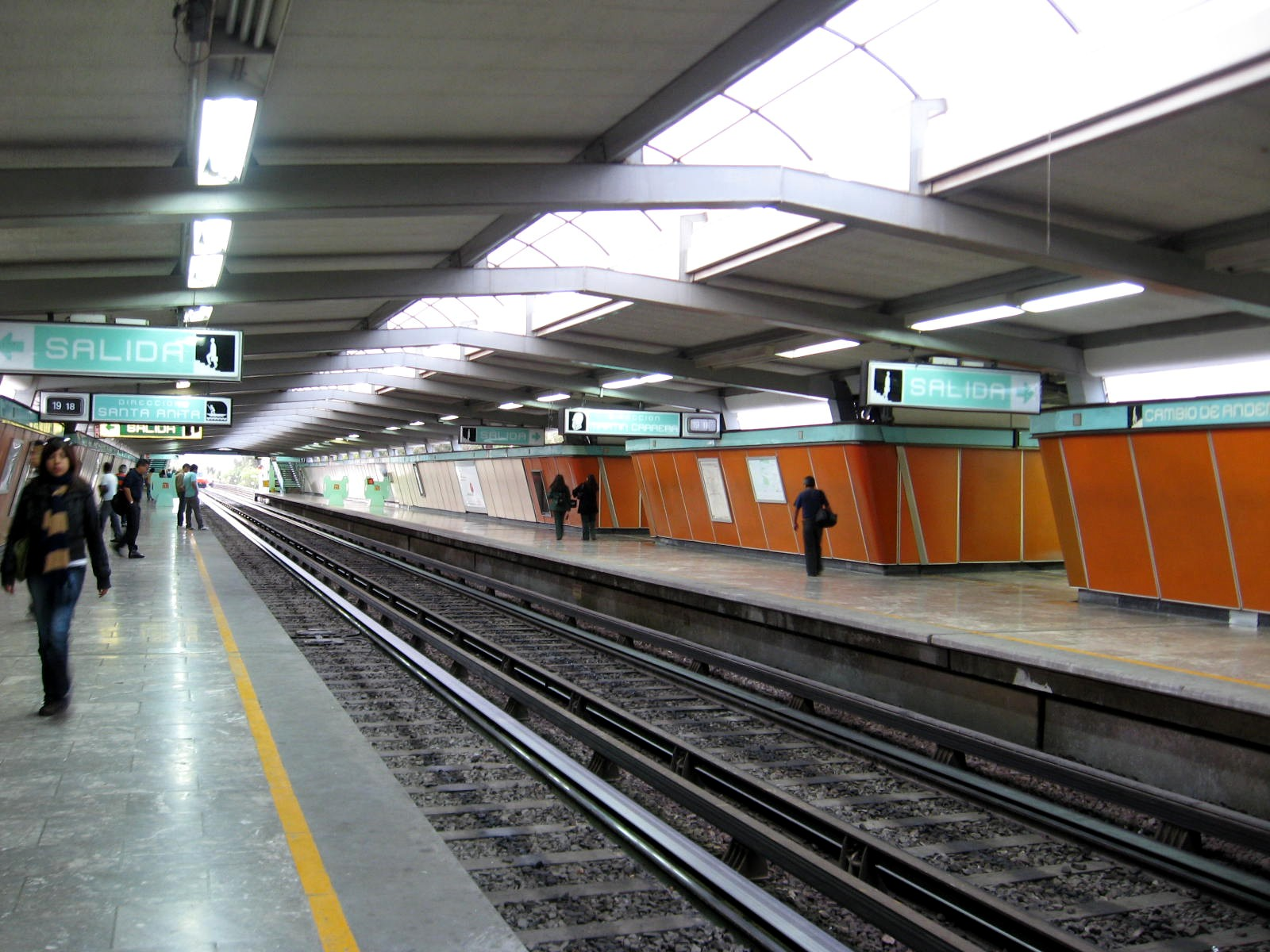
- Northbound platform (near)

General information
- Location: Avenida Congreso de la Unión and Fray Servando Teresa de Mier; Venustiano Carranza; Mexico City; Mexico
- Coordinates: 19°25′18″N 99°07′14″W
- System: Mexico City Metro
- Operator: Sistema de Transporte Colectivo (STC)
- Platforms: 2 side platforms
- Tracks: 2

Construction
- Structure type: Elevated
- Platform levels: 1
- Parking: No
- Cycle facilities: No
- Accessible: No

Other information
- Status: In service

History
- Opened: 26 May 1982; 44 years ago

Passengers
- 2025: 2,822,924 (Note: The data here is limited to the most recent ten years to avoid excessive listings; earlier figures can be found in this page's history or on the Mexico City Metro website. To calculate the average daily ridership, the annual total is divided by 365 days (366 in leap years), with decimals omitted from the result. Each station per line is ranked individually, as the system counts transfer stations separately. The percentage change is calculated automatically using the data from the current year and the previous year.) ▼5.6%
- Rank: 154/195

Services
Preceding station	Mexico City Metro	Following station
Candelaria toward Martín Carrera	Line 4	Jamaica toward Santa Anita
Route map
Location
- Location within Mexico City
- Area map

Fray Servando is a metro station along Line 4 of the Mexico City Metro. It is located in the Venustiano Carranza borough of Mexico City.

== Name and iconography ==
The station logo depicts the bust of Fray Servando Teresa de Mier, a friar who participated in Mexican independence.

== General information ==
Fray Servando, like other stations of line four, is located near Congreso de la Unión Avenue. This station serves Aeronáutica Militar and Merced Balbuena neighborhoods. The station was opened on 26 May 1982.

From 23 April to 14 June 2020, the station was temporarily closed due to the COVID-19 pandemic in Mexico.

=== Ridership ===
Annual passenger ridership
Year	Ridership	Average daily	Rank	% change	Ref.
2025	2,822,924	7,734	154/195	−5.60%
2024	2,990,448	8,170	143/195	−11.03%
2023	3,361,238	9,208	125/195	+15.69%
2022	2,905,299	7,959	135/195	+58.98%
2021	1,827,514	5,006	144/195	+17.40%
2020	1,556,639	4,253	163/195	−51.95%
2019	3,239,953	8,876	159/195	+1.80%
2018	3,182,617	8,719	160/195	+4.57%
2017	3,043,479	8,338	160/195	+2.67%
2016	2,964,350	8,099	166/195	+0.30%

== Nearby ==
- Parque de los Periodistas Ilustres, park.
- Seat of the Venustiano Carranza borough.

== Exits ==
- East: Avenida Congreso de la Unión and Fray Servando Teresa de Mier, Colonia Aeronáutica Militar
- West: Avenida Congreso de la Unión and Fray Servando Teresa de Mier, Colonia Merced Balbuena
