= Canal del Norte metro station =

Mexico City metro station

Canal del Norte
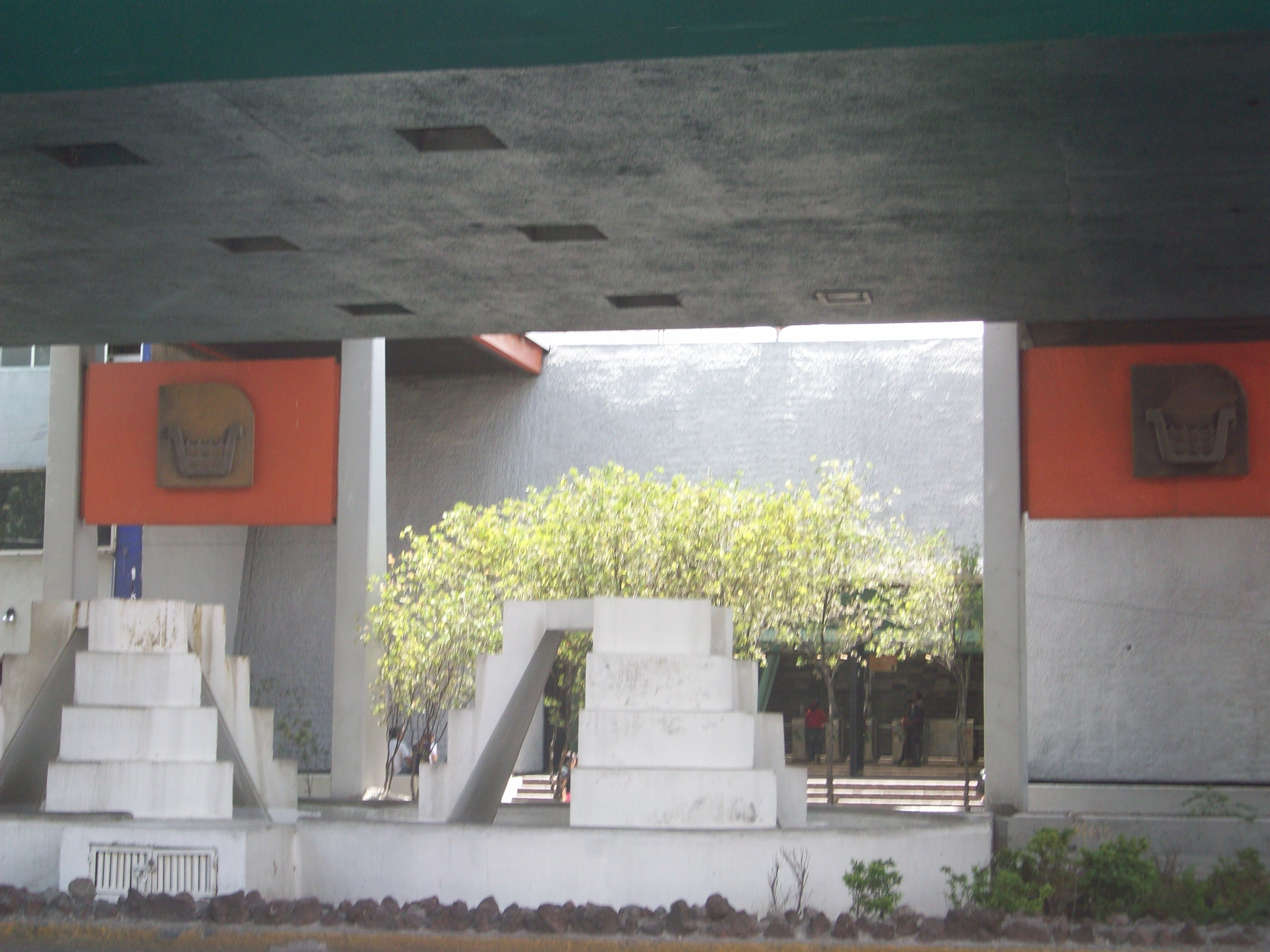

General information
- Location: Av. Congreso de la Unión and Talabarteros street Venustiano Carranza; Mexico City; Mexico
- Coordinates: 19°26′57″N 99°06′59″W
- System: Mexico City Metro
- Operator: Sistema de Transporte Colectivo (STC)
- Platforms: 2 side platforms
- Tracks: 2

Construction
- Structure type: Elevated
- Platform levels: 1
- Parking: No
- Cycle facilities: No
- Accessible: No

Other information
- Status: In service

History
- Opened: 29 August 1981; 44 years ago

Passengers
- 2025: 2,407,295 (Note: The data here is limited to the most recent ten years to avoid excessive listings; earlier figures can be found in this page's history or on the Mexico City Metro website. To calculate the average daily ridership, the annual total is divided by 365 days (366 in leap years), with decimals omitted from the result. Each station per line is ranked individually, as the system counts transfer stations separately. The percentage change is calculated automatically using the data from the current year and the previous year.) ▲0.48%
- Rank: 165/195

Services
Preceding station	Mexico City Metro	Following station
Consulado toward Martín Carrera	Line 4	Morelos toward Santa Anita
Route map
Location
- Location within Mexico City
- Area map

Canal del Norte is a station on the Mexico City Metro. It is located in the Venustiano Carranza borough, in the north of Mexico City.

== General information ==
The station logo depicts the transverse section of Canal del Norte (Northern Channel) a waterway that connected Mexico City with La Villa in the colonial era.

The station is located near Congreso de la Unión Avenue, and serves the Colonia Janitzio and Colonia Ampliación Michoacana neighborhoods. The station was opened on 29 August 1981.

From 23 April to 14 June 2020, the station was temporarily closed due to the COVID-19 pandemic in Mexico.

=== Ridership ===
Annual passenger ridership
Year	Ridership	Average daily	Rank	% change	Ref.
2025	2,407,295	6,595	165/195	+0.48%
2024	2,395,850	6,546	156/195	−1.55%
2023	2,433,473	6,667	145/195	+2.36%
2022	2,377,400	6,513	143/195	+38.64%
2021	1,714,787	4,698	148/195	−0.81%
2020	1,728,717	4,723	159/195	−47.66%
2019	3,303,152	9,049	157/195	+1.14%
2018	3,265,854	8,947	157/195	+0.80%
2017	3,239,834	8,876	157/195	−0.39%
2016	3,252,661	8,887	157/195	−3.37%

== Exits ==
- East: Av. Congreso de la Unión and Talabarteros Street, Colonia Ampliación Michoacana
- West: Av. Congreso de la Unión and Talabarteros Street, Colonia Janitzio
