= Mercado Jamaica =

Traditional public market in Mexico City

Coordinates: 19°24′29.14″N 99°7′22.29″W

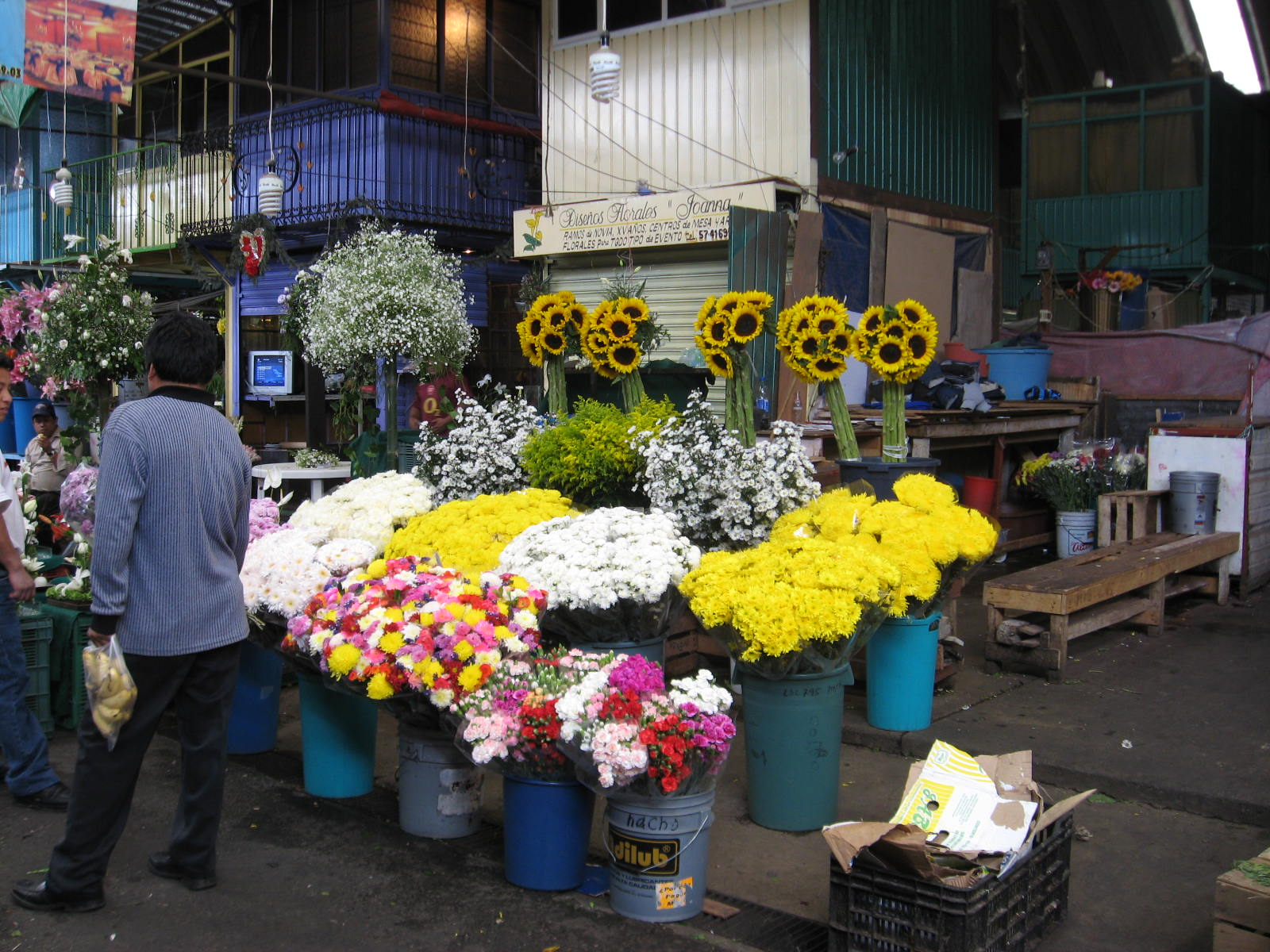
Stand selling flowers at the Mercado Jamaica

Mercado Jamaica is one of Mexico City’s traditional public markets where various vendors sell their wares in an established location. This market began in the 1950s as part of efforts to urbanize the markets in the area. The market is located on the corner of Congreso de la Union and Avenida Morelos, just southeast of the Historic center of Mexico City. Although it is one of the main markets for souvenirs, produce and meat, it is best known for its flowers and ornamental plants. There are 1,150 stands dedicated to the selling of cut flowers, flower arrangements, ornamental plants and accessories such as flowerpots. The market offers about 5,000 types of flowers and plants, mostly foreign, but there is a number of native Mexican species available, including some gathered directly from the wild.

In Spanish, jamaica means the hibiscus flower (as well as the island nation of Jamaica).

== Description ==
This market is housed in three large naves covering a city block on the corner of Congreso de la Unión and Avenida Morelos in the Venustiano Carranza borough. The Metro Jamaica station on Line 9 is directly in front of the building. The market is one of the principal ones for fruits, vegetables, flowers and ornamental plants in the city and is bustling to chaotic, especially on weekends.

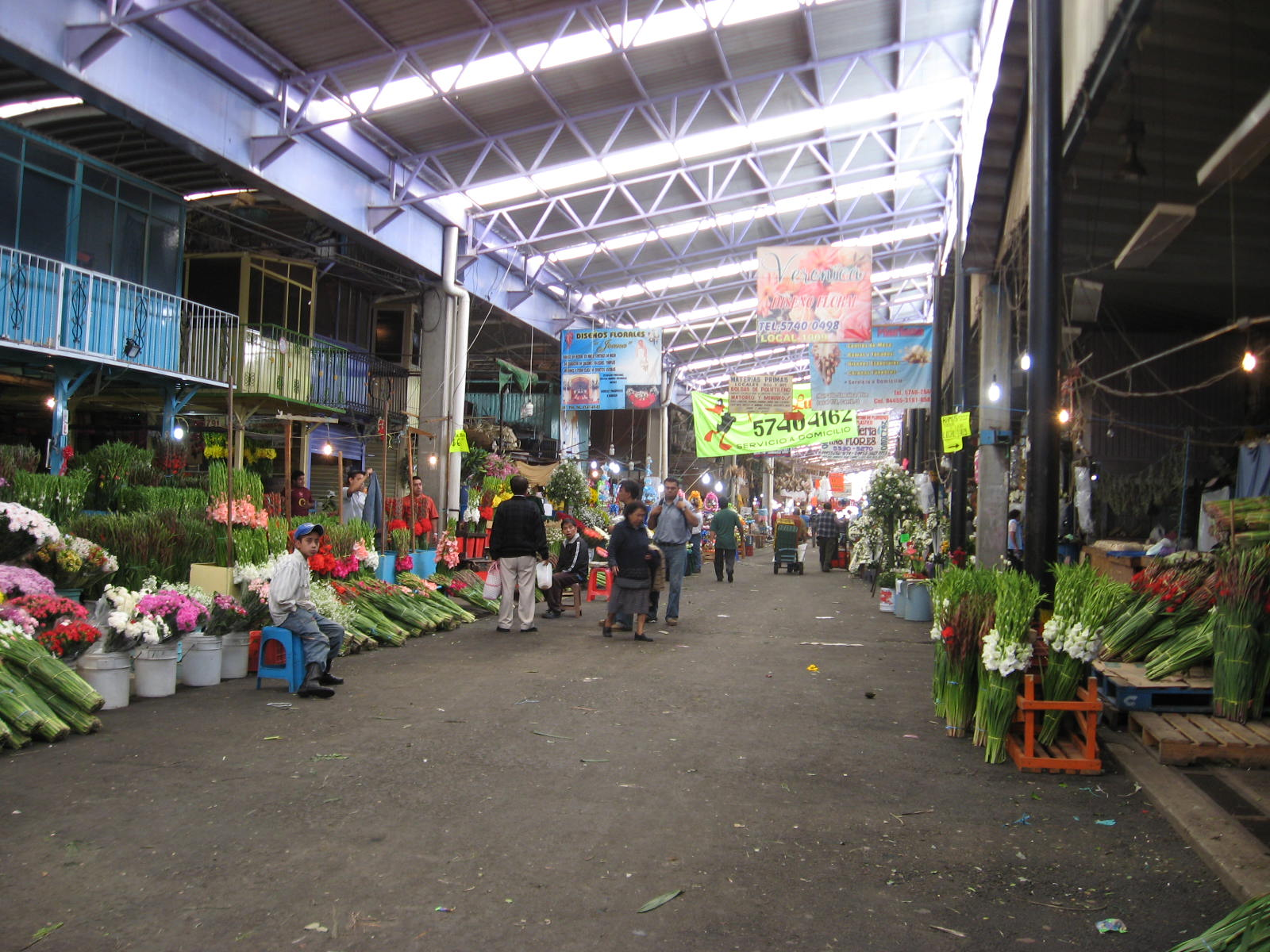
One of the aisle in the cut flowers section

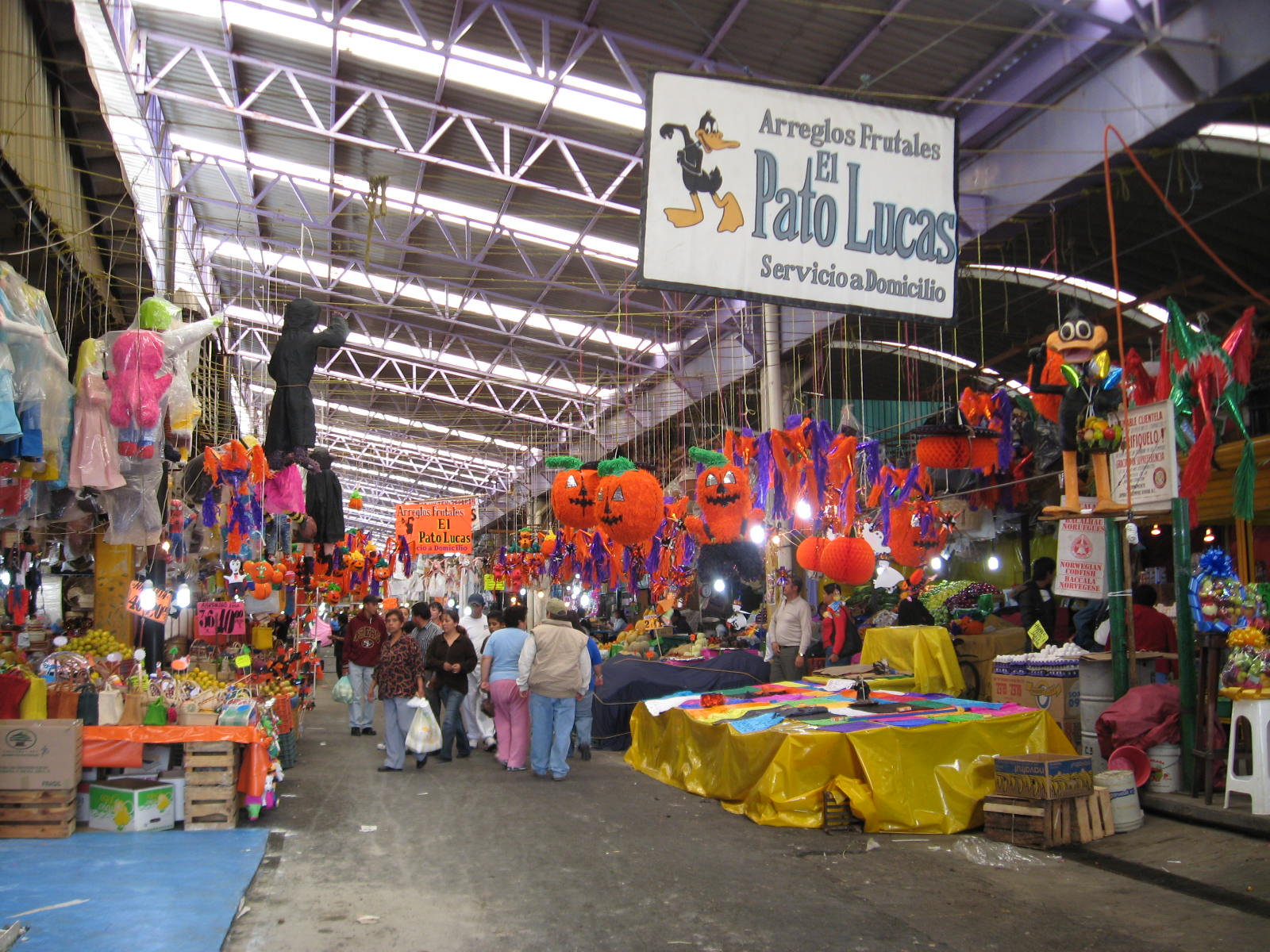
Halloween piñatas for sale at the market

The market is best known for the sale of flowers and ornamental plants. There are 1,150 stands dedicated to flowers, flower arrangements and ornamental plants and associated accessories. 25.5% sell cut flowers, 26% sell flower arrangements, 4.3% sell flower pots and other accessories, 40.9% of the stalls are reserved for the trucks of flower producers and sellers and 3.2% sell ornamental plants, including those from the wild. The market sells about 5,000 types flowers and ornamental plants from the states of Puebla, Veracruz, Chiapas, Oaxaca, State of Mexico and Michoacán. The variety of flowers is wide from roses to those from the various tropics. There are both retail and wholesale sales, mostly to florists in Mexico City, but sales are also made to some of the surrounding states. There are even exports to the United States and Haiti.

The market also sells a number of species of plants which are native to Mexico and not commonly appreciated as ornamental plants. Between this market and the flower market in Tenancingo, State of Mexico, a 2007 study identified 131 species from 93 genera and 42 families, with orchidaceae best represented. There are five main types: Briopsida, Pteridopsida, Pinopsida, Magnoliopsida and Liliopsida, with the last two accounting for 93% of all species. However, these 131 species are only a fraction of the 434 native Mexican species which have been identified as having ornamental potential. 95% of the species sold are on no or little risk of extinction or need of any special protection. Exceptions to this are Coryphantha elephantidens, Nymphaea odorata, Tillandsia imperialis, Campyloneurum phyllitidis, Cupressus lusitanica and Barkeria scandens. Many of these species are taken directly from the wild with little or no monitoring. However, the vast majority of the flower and plant species sold at the market are not native to Mexico, a situation reflected in the rest of the country. One reason for this is that most of the plant sellers here do not know the taxonomy of the native plants.

The market sells a number of other products besides plants and flowers. There are 312 stands dedicated to other merchandise such as produce, meat, groceries and other items, as a major supplies of basic staples in the area. Most of the meat sold is common, but unusual animals such as frogs and chichicuilotes (a type of native bird) can be found as well. The market is also one of the major sellers of Christmas trees in the city. Most of the species sold are not native to Mexico and many are imported as they are considered to have better foliage and are usually cheaper.

There is a section dedicated to piñatas, most made with cardboard and covered in crepe paper, although more traditional ones with a clay pot in the center can still be found. Designs range from traditional stars to those based on recent figures from popular movies and television shows. The busiest time of year for this section of the market is December, before Christmas, when a tradition called “Las Posadas” often involves the breaking of one or more piñatas. While traditional to that season, the breaking of piñatas is no longer confined to December and can be found at various types of celebrations year round, which helps to support this section’s permanent presence.

== History ==
Today, the area is part of the highly urbanized center of Mexico City, just south east of the historic center. In the past, this area was on the eastern edge of the Aztec island city of Tenochtitlan, facing Lake Xochimilco. The area was filled with artificial islands called “chinampas” for farming and docks to service the thousands of canoes and barges that passed through here on their way to city markets, especially the main market at Tlatelolco. Trade traffic diminished somewhat after the Spanish conquest of the Aztec Empire, but it still remained very important. However, during the colonial period, the lake and chinampa areas here slowly dried as the lakes were drained. By the 19th century, the area had only canals, with the main one, Canal de la Viga limited the water traffic through here. By the mid 20th century, these too would be dried and filled in. Traffic would shift to the various major roads constructed here. Through the area’s history, there had been a number of markets and tianguis here. The market was established along with a number of others such as Mercado de Sonora, to modernize the markets of the east end of town in the 1950s. Mercado Jamaica was inaugurated on September 23, 1957, and along with the Mercado de Sonora, was the first to offer parking for cars. In 2007, the market celebrated its 50th anniversary along with the then head of the borough of Venustiano Carranza, Julios César Moreno Rivera, which includes cultural activities and shows with popular music.
