= Bondojito metro station =

Mexico City metro station

Bondojito
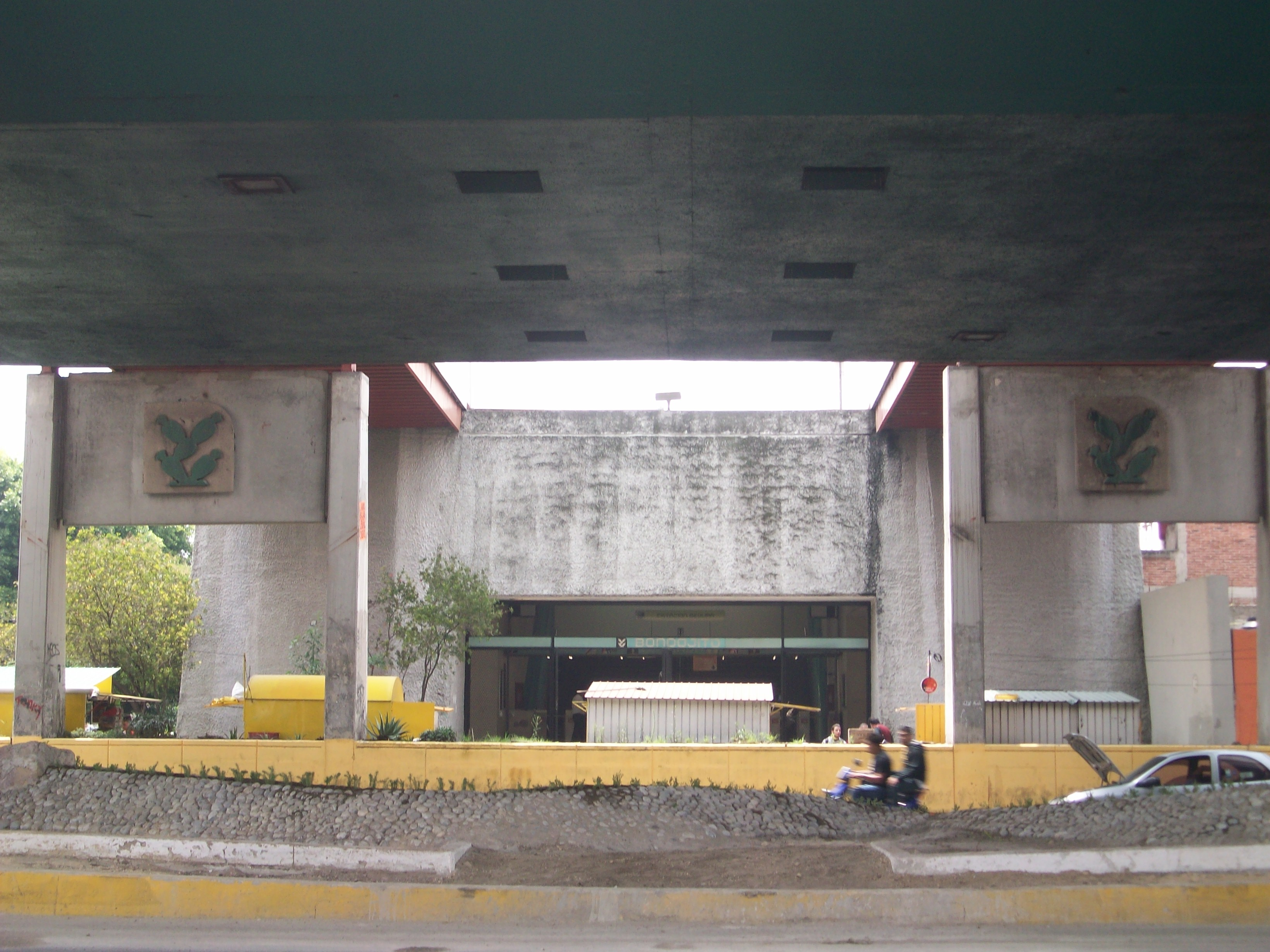

General information
- Location: Av. Congreso de la Unión; Gustavo A. Madero; Mexico City; Mexico
- Coordinates: 19°27′53″N 99°06′43″W
- System: Mexico City Metro
- Operator: Sistema de Transporte Colectivo (STC)
- Platforms: 2 side platforms
- Tracks: 2

Construction
- Structure type: Elevated
- Platform levels: 1
- Parking: No
- Cycle facilities: No

Other information
- Status: In service

History
- Opened: 29 August 1981; 45 years ago

Passengers
- 2025: 1,834,368 (Note: The data here is limited to the most recent ten years to avoid excessive listings; earlier figures can be found in this page's history or on the Mexico City Metro website. To calculate the average daily ridership, the annual total is divided by 365 days (366 in leap years), with decimals omitted from the result. Each station per line is ranked individually, as the system counts transfer stations separately. The percentage change is calculated automatically using the data from the current year and the previous year.) ▲0.65%
- Rank: 180/195

Services
Preceding station	Mexico City Metro	Following station
Talismán toward Martín Carrera	Line 4	Consulado toward Santa Anita
Route map
Location
- Location within Mexico City
- Area map

Bondojito is a metro station along Line 4 of the Mexico City Metro. It is located in the Gustavo A. Madero borough of Mexico City.

== General information ==
The station logo depicts a cactus, and its name refers to the Otomí word of Bondo, that means, in fact, cactus. In the zone where station stands existed big plantations of cactus (locally known as nopales).

This station transfers to "G" trolleybus line, which runs between Metro El Rosario and Metro Boulevard Puerto Aéreo.

Bondojito serves the Colonia Bondojito and Colonia Tablas de San Agustín neighborhoods. It stands over Avenida Congreso de la Unión.

From 23 April to 14 June 2020, the station was temporarily closed due to the COVID-19 pandemic in Mexico.

=== Ridership ===
Annual passenger ridership
Year	Ridership	Average daily	Rank	% change	Ref.
2025	1,834,368	5,025	180/195	+0.65%
2024	1,822,523	4,979	172/195	+0.08%
2023	1,821,073	4,989	162/195	+6.23%
2022	1,714,286	4,696	159/195	+37.93%
2021	1,242,891	3,405	164/195	+4.66%
2020	1,187,599	3,244	182/195	−49.93%
2019	2,371,742	6,497	178/195	−0.92%
2018	2,393,689	6,558	178/195	+4.21%
2017	2,296,986	6,293	179/195	−6.62%
2016	2,459,781	6,720	176/195	+0.88%

== Exits ==
- West: Avenida Congreso de la Unión and Oriente 101 street, Colonia Bondojito
- East: Avenida Congreso de la Unión and Oriente 103 street, Colonia Tablas de San Agustín
