= Mexico City Metro Line 4 =

Metro line in Mexico City

Line 4

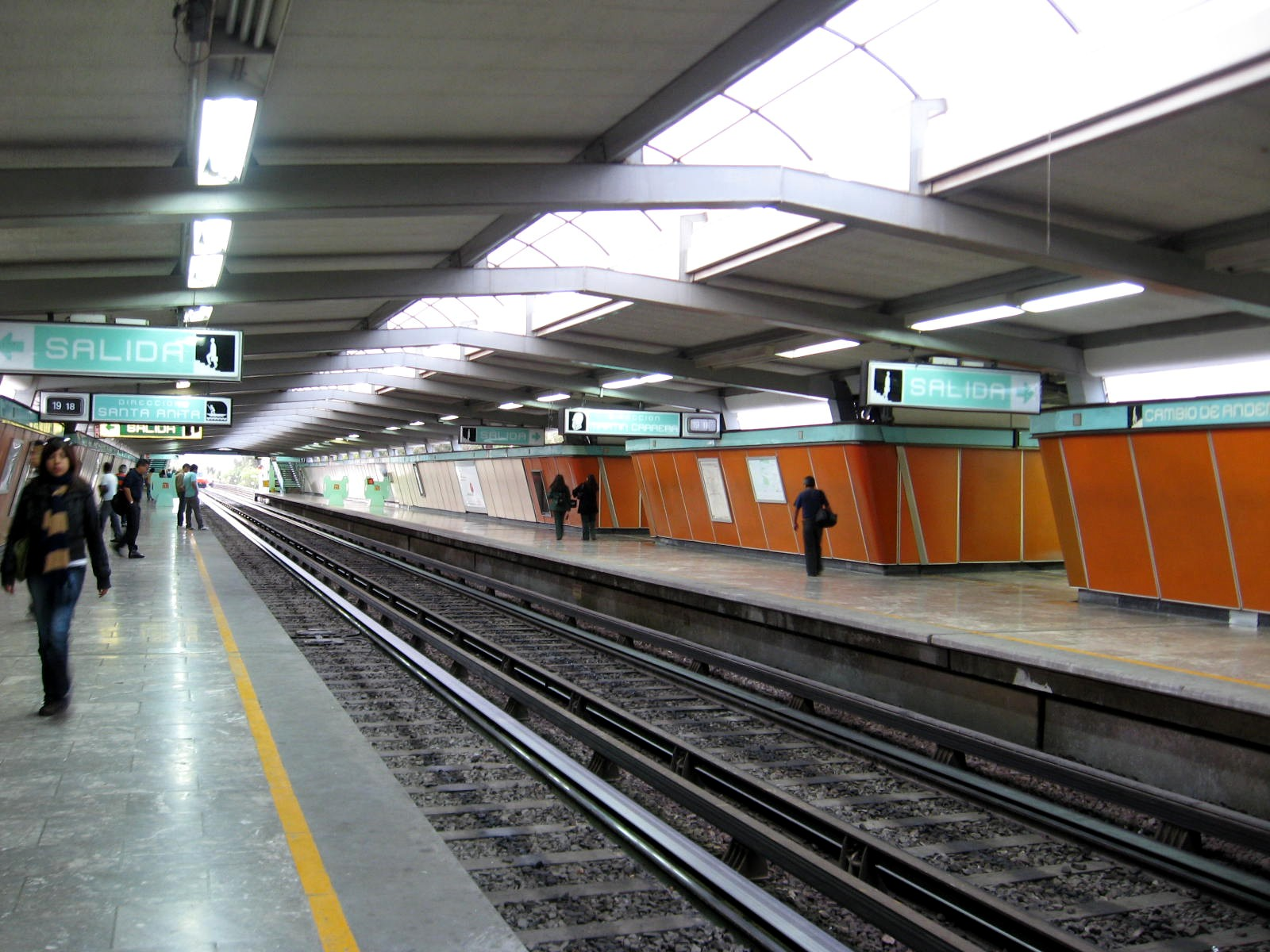
- Fray Servando station

Overview
- Locale: Mexico City
- Termini: Martín Carrera; Santa Anita
- Connecting lines: at Martín Carrera; at Consulado; at Morelos; at Candelaria; at Jamaica; at Santa Anita
- Stations: 10
- Website: metro.cdmx.gob.mx

Service
- Type: Rapid transit
- System: Mexico City Metro
- Operator(s): Sistema de Transporte Colectivo (STC)
- Rolling stock: NM-73AR
- Ridership: 24,858,632 (2024)

History
- Opened: 29 August 1981; 44 years ago
- Last extension: 1982

Technical
- Line length: 9.363 km (5.8 mi)
- Track length: 10.747 km (6.7 mi)
- Number of tracks: 2
- Track gauge: 1,435 mm (4 ft 8 1/2 in) standard gauge with roll ways along track
- Electrification: Guide bar, 750 V DC
Route map
Line 4 route highlighted in gray

Mexico City Metro Line 4 is the fourth line of Mexico City Metro. The line color is aqua blue and it runs from north to south of the city crossing the city center by its easternmost area. In 2019 it had a total ridership of 29,013,032 passengers, making it the least used line on the system.

== General information ==
It was built above the former Inguarán Avenue (now Congreso de la Unión) in viaduct solution, this makes it the only line without an underground section. With only ten stations, its short length is countervailed with its high connectivity, having transfer with other metro lines in six stations: Line 6 at Martín Carrera, Line 5 at Consulado, Line B at Morelos, Line 1 at Candelaria, Line 9 at Jamaica and Line 8 at Santa Anita. However, it is also the line with the fewest passengers in the entire system, having only 29,013,032 passengers throughout 2019.

The line is also characterized by its above-ground architecture, having all of its station facilities elevated or in massive buildings present in both sides of the street. A side effect of this is having long passageways with connecting lines, generally unused or empty sections in stations, closed passageways and other features, all due to its low ridership. Also, trains in Line 4 have been shortened from its original configuration of nine cars to only six.

== History ==
The first stretch of Line 4 was inaugurated on 29 August 1981, from Martín Carrera station to Candelaria station. Line 4 was the first line to feature an elevated section, built over Avenida H. Congreso de la Unión. Lines 9, B and 12 would later also have elevated sections. The total cost of Line 4's first stage was 6,900 million pesos.

The second stage of the line was opened for service on 26 May 1982, with four new stations, going from Candelaria to Santa Anita.

Upon completion of the line, it had only two transfer stations: Candelaria with Line 1 and Consulado with Line 5. Transfer to Line 6 at Martín Carrera would open in 1986, to Line 9 at Jamaica in 1987, to Line 8 at Santa Anita in 1995 and to Line B at Morelos in 1999.

There were two plans to expand the line. In 1985, according to a plan presented by the Comisión de Vialidad y Transporte Urbano (COVITUR), Line 4 was projected to be expanded southbound from Santa Anita towards Culhuacán, the stretch would have a length of 9.22 km (5.73 mi) and seven new stations. Such plan never materialized.

In 1996, the Sistema de Transporte Colectivo (STC) on its master plan for Mexico City Metro considered building an expansion for Line 4; this time, it would be expanded northbound from Martín Carrera to Ecatepec in the State of Mexico. This new section would have six new stations and a length of 6.1 km (3.8 mi). As with the 1985 plan, this extension was never built.

In 2018, the STC again presented a plan projected to 2030. In this document, there is an extension planned for Line 4 that would expand the line northward from Martín Carrera towards Tepexpan and southward from Santa Anita to the southern part of the Periférico. Thirty-one more stations would be built according to the plan: ten southbound and 21 northbound, adding a total of 34.87 km (21.67 mi) to Line 4.

== Chronology ==
- 29 August 1981: from Martín Carrera to Candelaria
- 26 May 1982: from Candelaria to Santa Anita

== Rolling stock ==
Line 4 has had different types of rolling stock throughout the years.

- Alstom MP-68: 1981–1985
- Concarril NM-73: 1981–present
- Concarril NM-79: 1981

Out of the 390 trains in the Mexico City Metro network, 12 are in service in Line 4, this is the fewest trains per line in the entire system.

== Station list ==
Key (Note: The following list was adapted from different websites and official maps.: Metro connections obtained from the official Mexico City Metro system map.; Accessibility obtained from the Mexico City Metro system map. In some cases, the map omits the accessibility icon as the station(s) are actually partially accessible. However, the respective websites of each station on the official site indicate the respective accessibility methods. Stations with the symbol ‡ are fully accessible; stations with the symbol † are partially accessible.; Cablebús obtained from their official website.; Centro de transferencia modal (CETRAM;) obtained from the official website of the Órgano Regulador de Transporte.; Ecobici obtained from their official website.; Metrobús obtained from the Mexico City Metrobús system map.; Mexibús obtained from the official Mexico City Metro system map.; Mexicable obtained from the official Mexico City Metro system map.; Public buses network (peseros) obtained from the official website of the Órgano Regulador de Transporte.; Red de Transporte de Pasajeros obtained from their official website.; Trolleybuses obtained from their official website.)
Handicapped/disabled access	Fully accessible station	Cablebús Line {{{3}}}	Cablebús connection	Red de Transporte de Pasajeros	RTP connection
Handicapped/disabled access	Partially accessible station	Mexibús	Mexibús connection	Tren Interurbano	Tren Interurbano connection
Transfer hub	CETRAM transfer station	Mexicable	Mexicable connection	Tren Suburbano	Tren Suburbano connection
Transfer hub	ETRAM transfer station	Mexico City Metro	Mexico City Metro connection	Trolleybus	Trolleybus connection
Ecobici	Ecobici bikeshare	Mexico City minubus	Pesero connection	Xochimilco Light Rail	Xochimilco Light Rail connection

The stations from north to south are:

Station	Handicapped/disabled access	Opened	Level	Distance (km)		Connections	Location
Station	Handicapped/disabled access	Opened	Level	Between stations	Total	Connections	Location
Martín Carrera		August 29, 1981	Ground-level	—N/a	0.0	33, 37; 5A	Gustavo A. Madero
Talismán		August 29, 1981	Elevated	1.3	1.3	37; 15A, 15B, 15C	Gustavo A. Madero
Bondojito		August 29, 1981	Elevated	1.1	2.4	(at Av. Congreso de la Unión); 11A, 12, 37; 5A	Gustavo A. Madero
Consulado		August 29, 1981	Elevated	0.8	3.2	37; 5A	Gustavo A. Madero
Canal del Norte		August 29, 1981	Elevated	1.0	4.2	37; 5A	Venustiano Carranza
Morelos	Handicapped/disabled access	August 29, 1981	Elevated	1.1	5.3	18, 37; 5A, 10E	Venustiano Carranza
Candelaria/Palacio Legislativo		August 29, 1981	Ground-level	1.2	6.4	37; 5A	Venustiano Carranza
Fray Servando		May 26, 1982	Elevated	0.8	7.3	37; 5A, 19E, 19F, 19G, 19H	Venustiano Carranza
Jamaica	Handicapped/disabled access	May 26, 1982	Elevated	1.2	8.4	37; 5A, 9C, 9E	Venustiano Carranza
Santa Anita		May 26, 1982	Elevated	0.9	9.3	37; 5A, 14A	Iztacalco

== Ridership ==
The following table shows each of Line 4's stations' total and average daily ridership during 2019.

†	Transfer station
†‡	Transfer station and terminal

Rank	Station	Total ridership	Average daily
1	Martín Carrera†‡	6,818,051	18,680
2	Canal del Norte	3,303,152	9,050
3	Fray Servando	3,239,953	8,877
4	Morelos†	3,020,965	8,277
5	Candelaria†	2,953,147	8,091
6	Jamaica†	2,876,658	7,881
7	Bondojito	2,371,742	6,498
8	Talismán	1,965,881	5,386
9	Consulado†	1,608,777	4,408
10	Santa Anita†‡	854,706	2,342
Total		29,013,032	79,488

== See also ==
- List of Mexico City Metro lines
