= Jamaica metro station =

Mexico City metro station

Jamaica
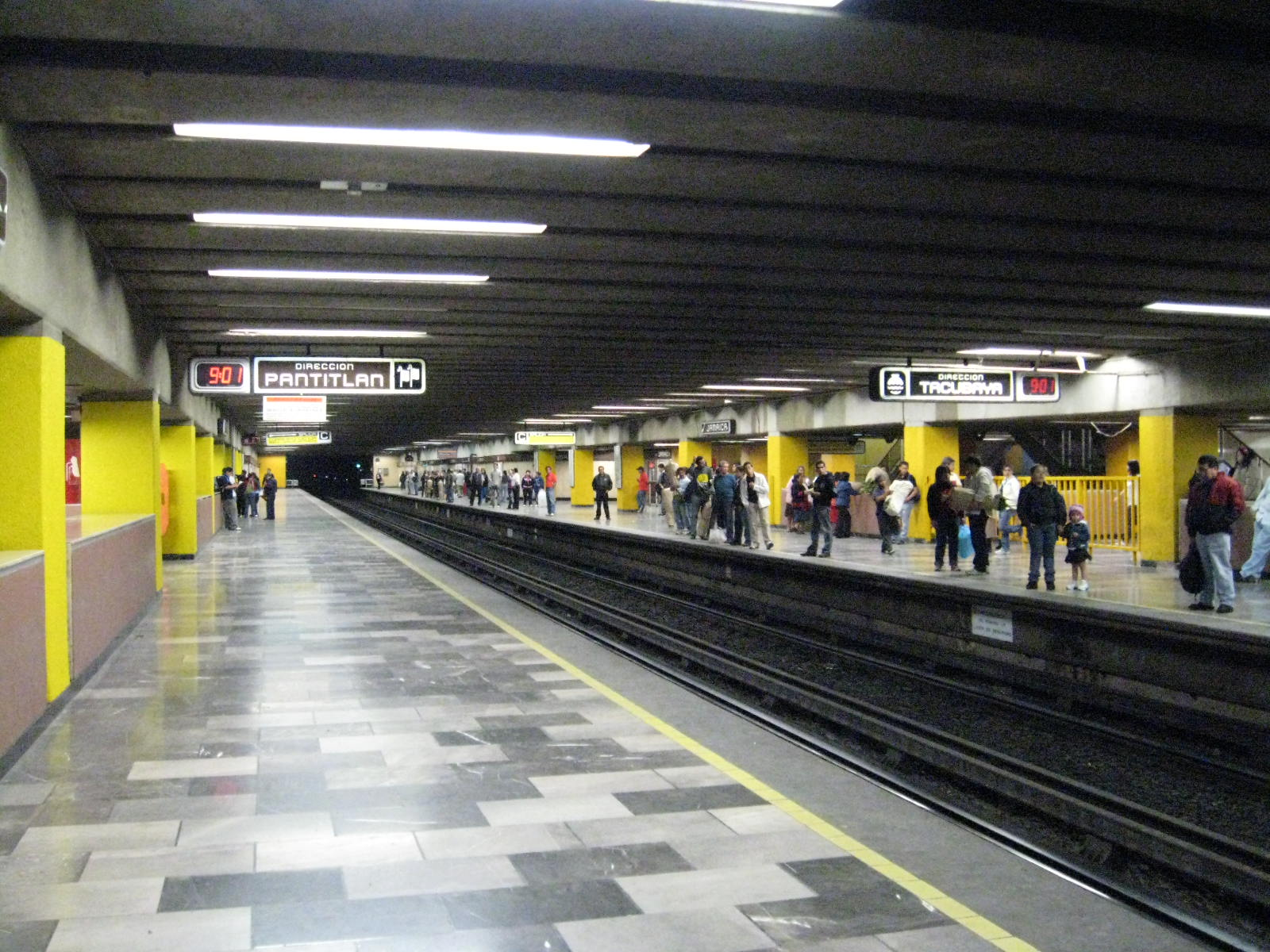
- View of westbound platform of Metro Jamaica line 9 portion

General information
- Location: Venustiano Carranza; Mexico City; Mexico
- Coordinates: 19°24′32.414″N 99°7′19.816″W
- Elevation: 10 m (33 ft)
- System: STC Rapid transit
- Owner: Mexico City Metro
- Operator: Sistema de Transporte Colectivo (STC)
- Platforms: 4 side platforms
- Tracks: 4
- Bus routes: 33, 37
- Bus operators: Red de Transporte de Pasajeros (RTP)

Construction
- Structure type: Elevated; Underground
- Parking: No
- Cycle facilities: No
- Accessible: Yes

Other information
- Status: In service

History
- Opened: 26 May 1982; 44 years ago 26 August 1987; 38 years ago

Passengers
- 2025: Total: 6,149,571; 2,286,747 (Note: The data here is limited to the most recent ten years to avoid excessive listings; earlier figures can be found in this page's history or on the Mexico City Metro website. To calculate the average daily ridership, the annual total is divided by 365 days (366 in leap years), with decimals omitted from the result. Each station per line is ranked individually, as the system counts transfer stations separately. The percentage change is calculated automatically using the data from the current year and the previous year.); 3,862,824 ▲22.98%
- Rank: 168/195; 135/195

Services
Preceding station	Mexico City Metro	Following station
Fray Servando toward Martín Carrera	Line 4	Santa Anita Terminus
Chabacano toward Tacubaya	Line 9	Mixiuhca toward Pantitlán
Route map
Location
- Location within Mexico City
- Area map

Jamaica is a station of the Mexico City Metro. It is located in Venustiano Carranza borough in Mexico City and serves the Sevilla neighbourhood.

== General information ==
The station logo depicts an ear of corn. Its name refers to the nearby wholesale market of Jamaica.

This station combines both elevated viaducts for line 4 and underground passages for line 9. The distance between platforms is long, as are the station's exits. Metro Jamaica has a cultural display.

=== Ridership ===
Annual passenger ridership (Line 4)
Year	Ridership	Average daily	Rank	% change	Ref.
2025	2,286,747	6,265	168/195	+5.01%
2024	2,177,713	5,950	166/195	−6.34%
2023	2,325,236	6,370	150/195	+7.18%
2022	2,169,485	5,943	148/195	+39.92%
2021	1,550,480	4,247	155/195	+3.99%
2020	1,490,971	4,073	168/195	−48.17%
2019	2,876,658	7,881	168/195	−4.83%
2018	3,022,497	8,280	164/195	+4.10%
2017	2,903,552	7,954	166/195	+6.30%
2016	2,731,554	7,463	171/195	−2.73%

Annual passenger ridership (Line 9)
Year	Ridership	Average daily	Rank	% change	Ref.
2025	3,862,824	10,583	135/195	+36.84%
2024	2,822,809	7,712	148/195	−24.90%
2024	2,822,809	7,712	148/195	−24.90%
2023	3,758,629	10,297	118/195	+4.91%
2022	3,582,876	9,816	118/195	+36.65%
2021	2,621,993	7,183	119/195	−3.65%
2020	2,721,419	7,435	129/195	−40.35%
2019	4,561,989	12,498	135/195	+4.19%
2018	4,378,419	11,995	138/195	+4.29%
2017	4,198,411	11,502	139/195	−2.93%
2016	4,325,034	11,817	138/195	−1.83%

== Nearby ==
- Mercado de Jamaica, public market.

== Exits ==
=== Line 4 ===
- East: Avenida Congreso de la Unión and José María Roa Bárcenas street, Colonia Mixiuhca
- West: Avenida Congreso de la Unión and José María Roa Bárcenas street, Colonia Sevilla

=== Line 9 ===
- Northeast: Avenida Congreso de la Unión and Cincel street, Colonia Jamaica
- Southeast: Avenida Congreso de la Unión, Colonia Jamaica
- Northwest: Avenida Morelos and Compás street, Colonia Sevilla
- Southwest: Avenida Morelos, Colonia Sevilla
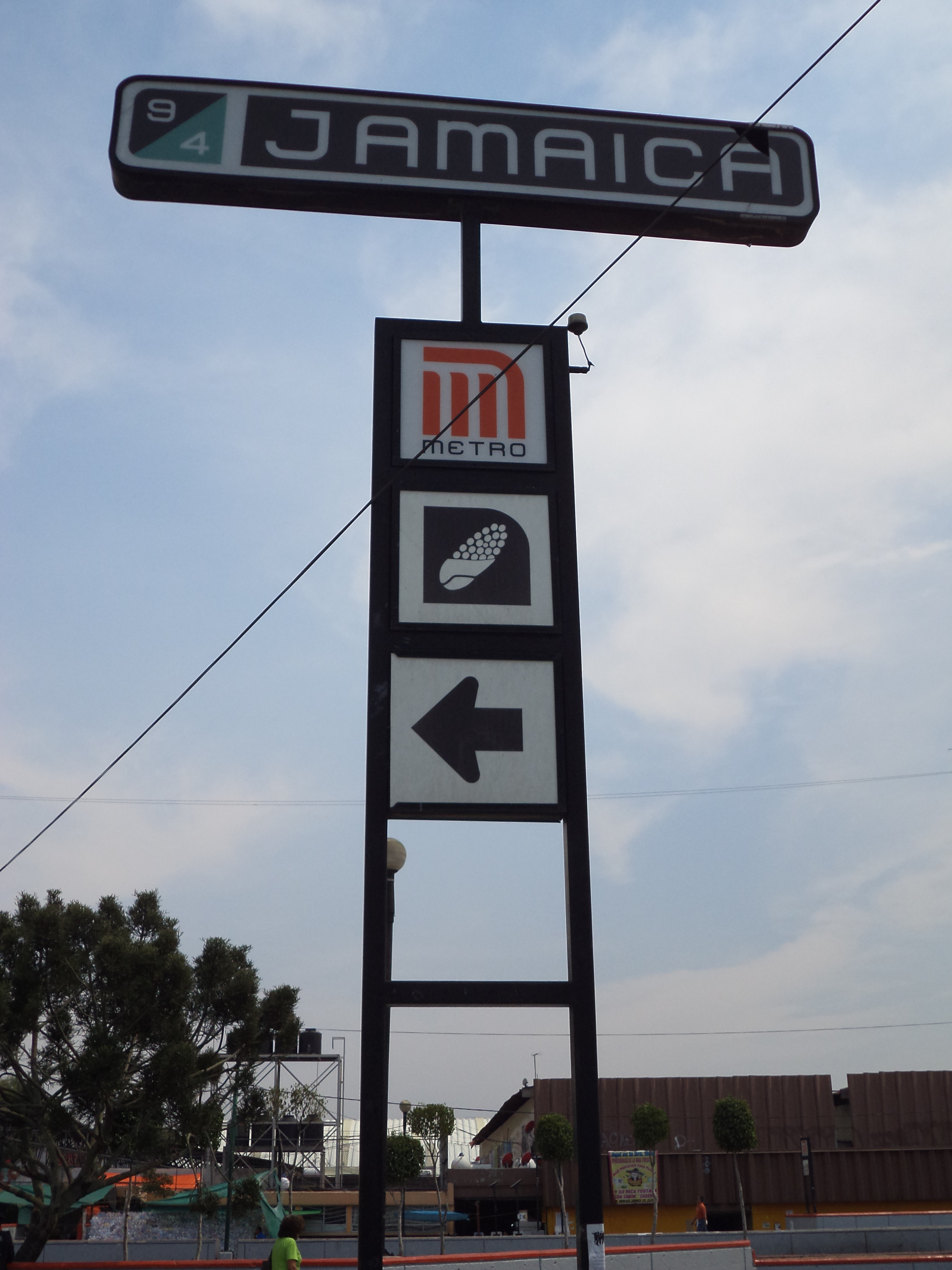
Station entrance sign

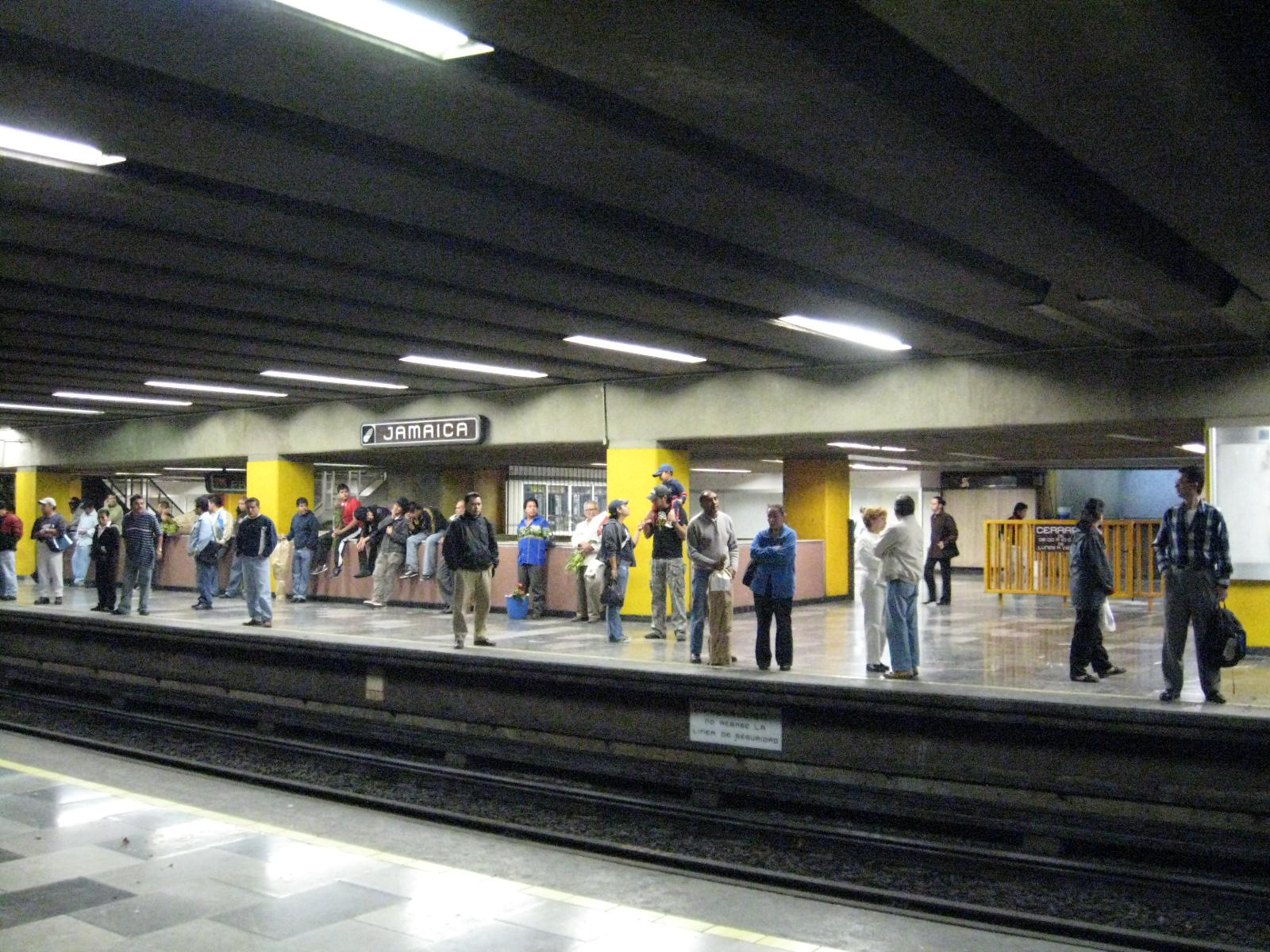
View of westbound platform of Metro station Jamaica Line 9 of the Mexico City Metro System

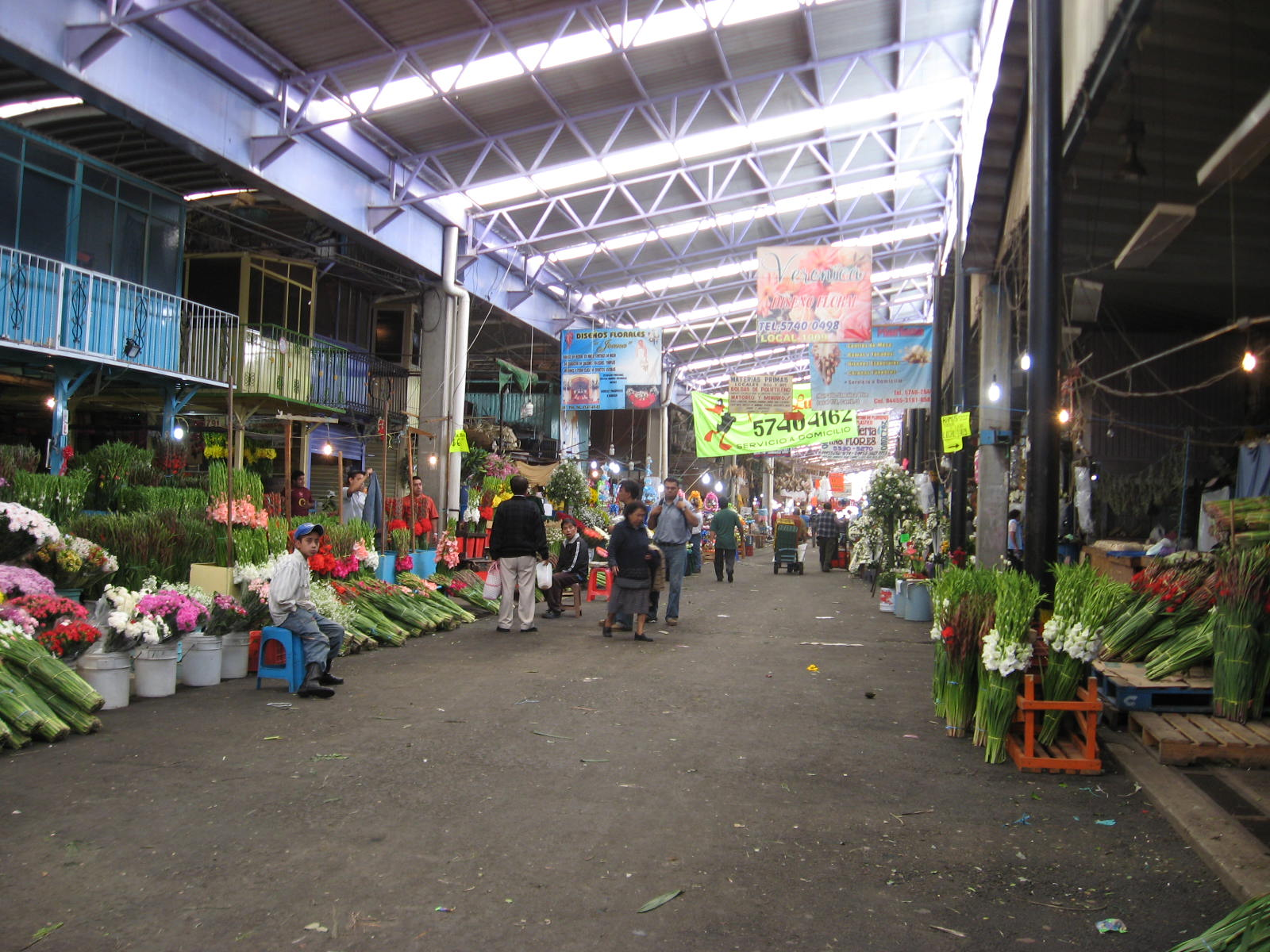
Aisle in the Jamaica Market

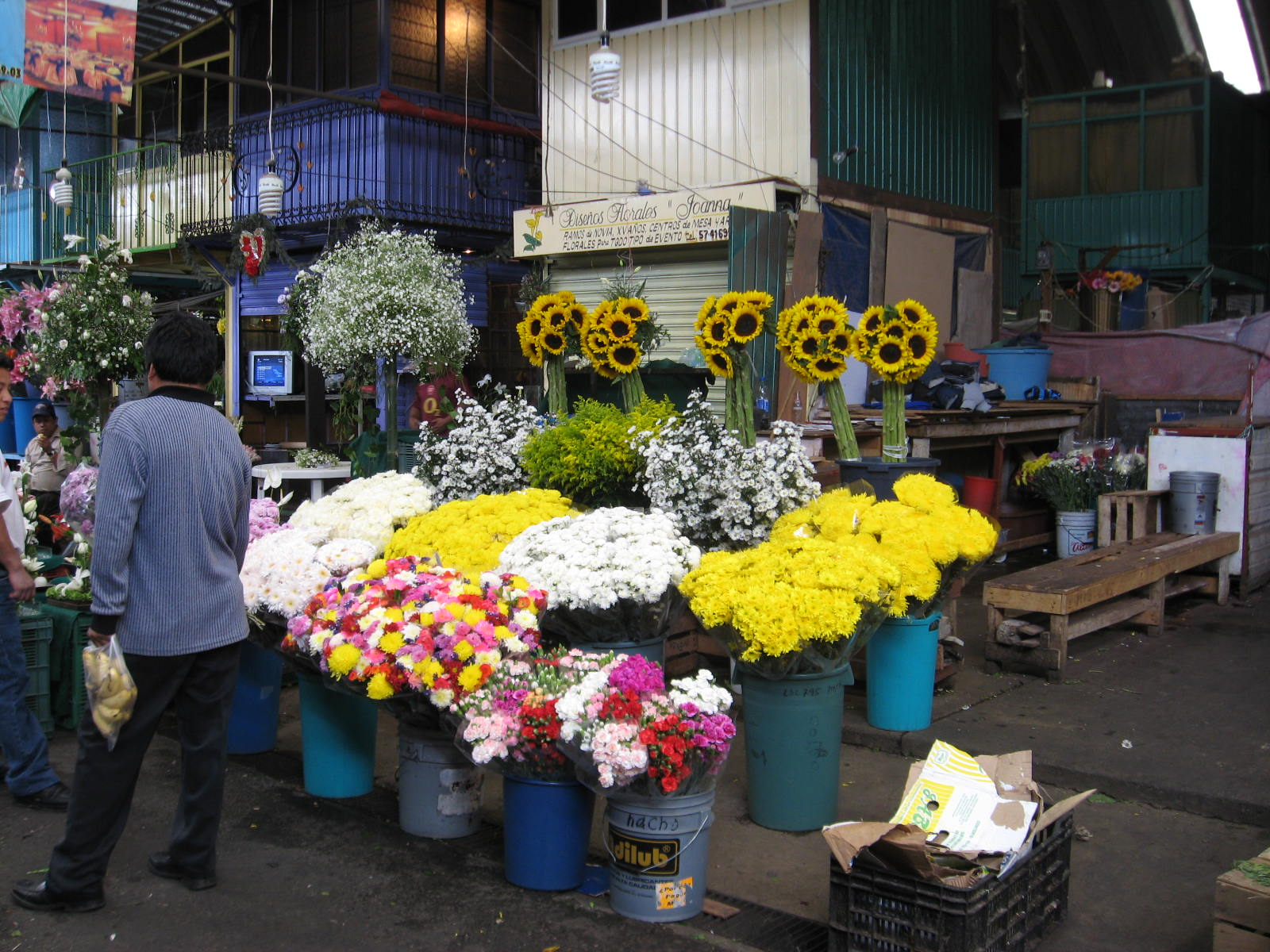
One of the flower stands in the Jamaica Market

== See also ==
- Mercado Jamaica, Mexico City
