= Candelaria metro station =

Mexico City metro station

Candelaria
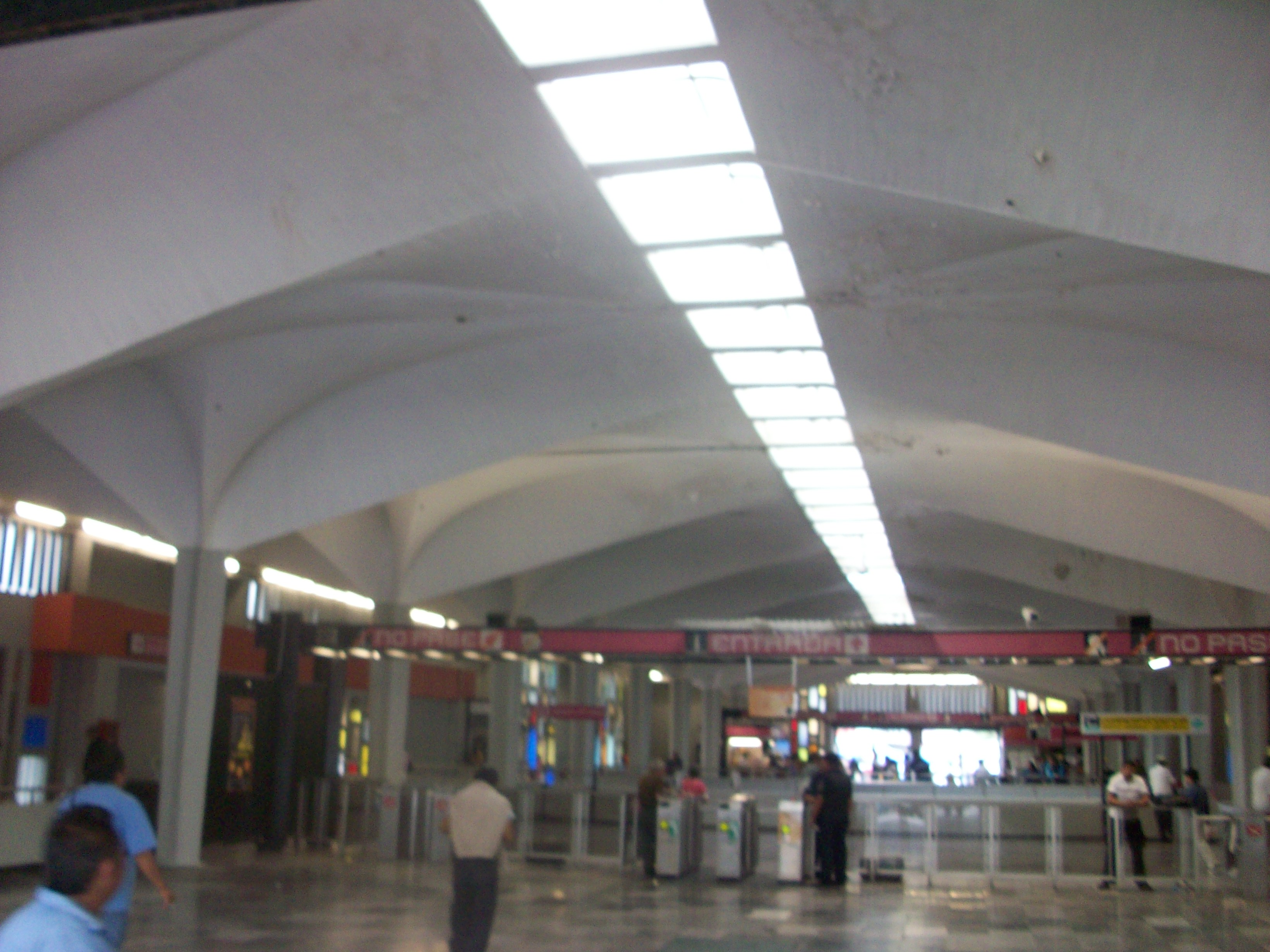
- Distinctive thin shell ceiling inside the entranceway of Candeleria by Félix Candela

General information
- Other names: Candelaria / Palacio Legislativo
- Location: Candelaria de los Patos, Venustiano Carranza; Mexico City; Mexico
- Coordinates: 19.428837°N 99.119511°W
- System: Mexico City Metro
- Operator: Sistema de Transporte Colectivo (STC)
- Platforms: 4 side platforms
- Tracks: 4
- Connections: Cecilio Robelo; Routes 37

Construction
- Structure type: Underground; At grade
- Parking: No
- Cycle facilities: No

Other information
- Status: In service

History
- Opened: 4 September 1969; 56 years ago 29 August 1981; 44 years ago

Key dates
- 11 July 2022: Temporarily closed
- 29 October 2023: Reopened

Passengers
- 2025: Total: 8,884,996; 6,064,052 (Note: The data here is limited to the most recent ten years to avoid excessive listings; earlier figures can be found in this page's history or on the Mexico City Metro website. To calculate the average daily ridership, the annual total is divided by 365 days (366 in leap years), with decimals omitted from the result. Each station per line is ranked individually, as the system counts transfer stations separately. The percentage change is calculated automatically using the data from the current year and the previous year.); 2,820,944 ▲67.07%
- Rank: 76/195; 155/195

Services
Preceding station	Mexico City Metro	Following station
Merced toward Observatorio	Line 1	San Lázaro toward Pantitlán
Morelos toward Martín Carrera	Line 4	Fray Servando toward Santa Anita
Route map
Location
- Location within Mexico City
- Area map

Candelaria (Candelaria / Palacio Legislativo in some of the Line 4 signage) is a Mexico City Metro rail station. It is located in Venustiano Carranza municipality east of downtown Mexico City. It lies along Lines 1 and 4. From July 2022 to October 2023, the Line 1 station was closed due to modernization works on the tunnel and the line's technical equipment.

== Name and iconography ==
The station logo depicts a swimming duck. Its name and logo come from the surrounding neighbourhood of La Candelaria de los Patos (the Spanish word pato means "duck") where, only a few decades ago, many duck species lived and were bred and sold in a local market.

== General information ==
Metro Candelaria has a subsidiary name, Metro Palacio Legislativo ("Legislative Palace"), because of its proximity to the Palacio Legislativo de San Lázaro used by the Chamber of Deputies (Cámara de diputados), the lower house of the Mexican Congress.

Candelaria is a transfer station, with Line 1 running underground and Line 4 on an elevated surface viaduct. The station features an in-corridor cultural display. The Line 1 platform for the station was opened on 5 September 1969, and the Line 4 platform was opened on 29 August 1981. Service from Candeleria to Santa Anita started on 25 May 1982.

This station has the only "Lost and Found" office in the entire Metro system. It displays the architecture of Félix Candela, who designed the Candelaria station and many buildings in Mexico, such as the San Lázaro metro station and the Palacio de los Deportes, which served as a venue during the 1968 Summer Olympics.

== Nearby ==
- Palacio Legislativo de San Lázaro, main seat of the legislative power of the Mexican government.

== Exits ==
=== Line 1 ===
- North: Avenida Candelaria de los Patos, Candelaria de los Patos
- South: Avenida Candelaria de los Patos, Candelaria de los Patos

=== Line 4 ===
- East: Avenida Congreso de la Unión and Sidar y Rovirosa street, Colonia El Parque
- West: Avenida Congreso de la Unión and General Anaya street, Candelaria de los Patos

== Ridership ==
Annual passenger ridership (Line 1)
Year	Ridership	Average daily	Rank	% change	Ref.
2025	6,064,052	16,613	76/195	+18.51%
2024	5,117,108	13,981	92/195	+527.37%
2023	815,643	2,234	181/195	−78.51%
2022	3,795,335	10,398	116/195	−41.23%
2021	6,457,461	17,691	30/195	−11.38%
2020	7,286,788	19,909	28/195	−14.82%
2019	8,554,561	23,437	60/195	+0.83%
2018	8,484,051	23,243	66/195	−2.87%
2017	8,734,718	23,930	60/195	−4.68%
2016	9,163,851	25,037	59/195	−1.74%

Annual passenger ridership (Line 4)
Year	Ridership	Average daily	Rank	% change	Ref.
2025	2,820,944	7,728	155/195	−7.20%
2024	3,039,796	8,305	141/195	−32.49%
2023	4,502,515	12,335	105/195	+39.40%
2022	3,229,966	8,849	125/195	+68.91%
2021	1,912,281	5,239	142/195	+15.21%
2020	1,659,786	4,534	161/195	−43.80%
2019	2,953,147	8,090	165/195	+3.13%
2018	2,863,399	7,844	167/195	+3.74%
2017	2,760,169	7,562	170/195	+0.83%
2016	2,737,480	7,476	169/195	−0.85%

== Gallery ==
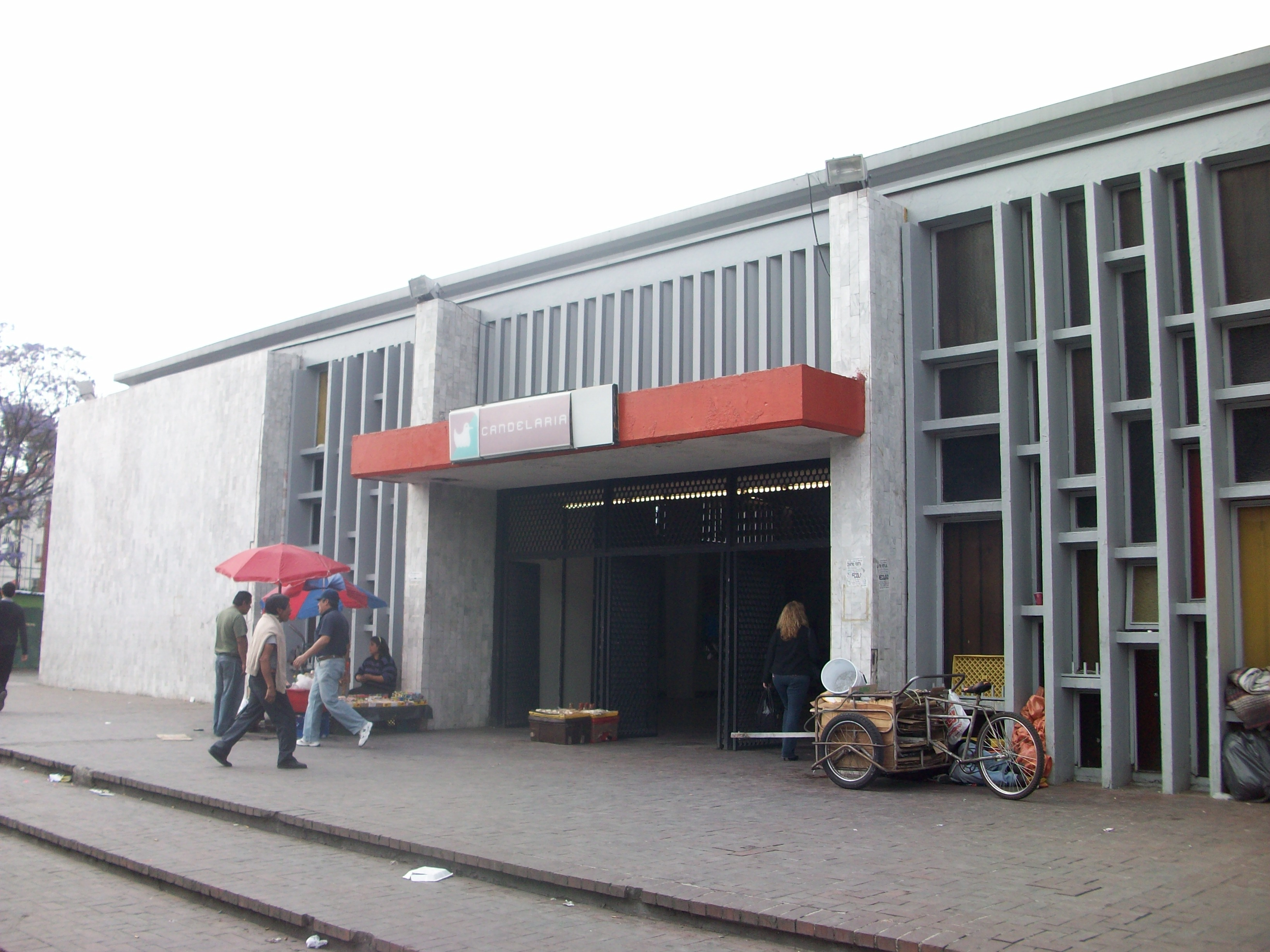
Entrance to the station

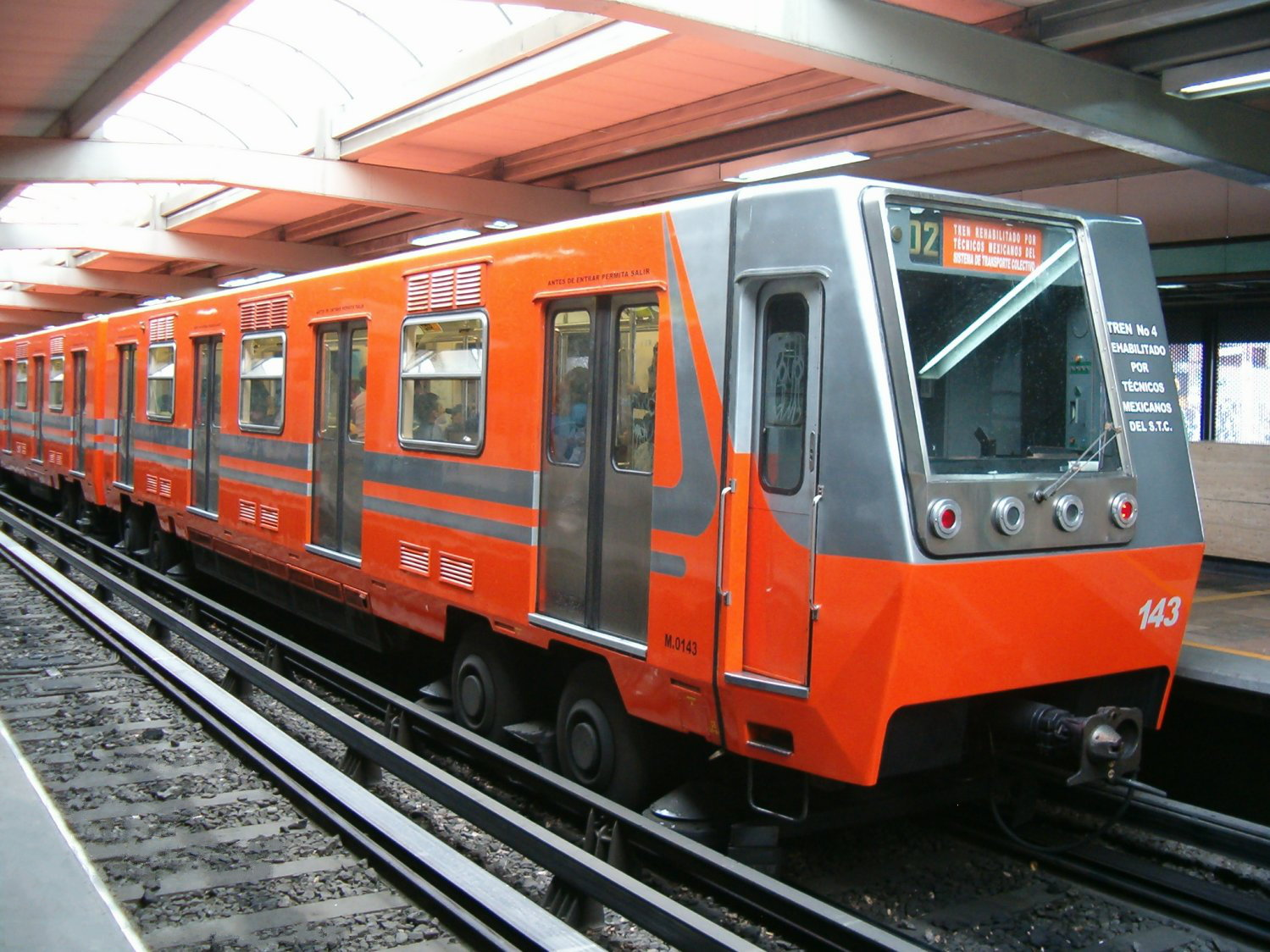
An NM-73B at the Line 4 platforms

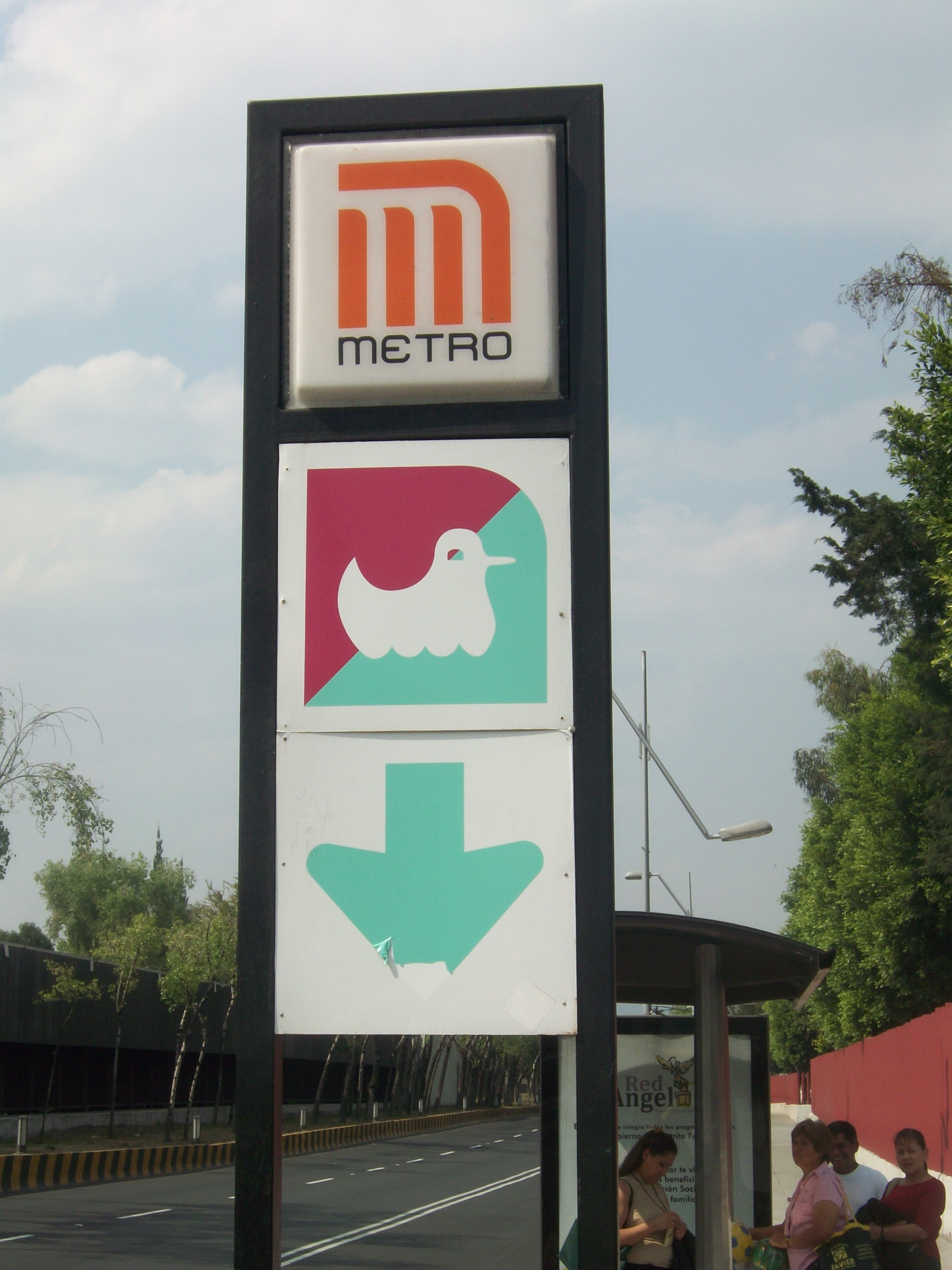
Entry sign
