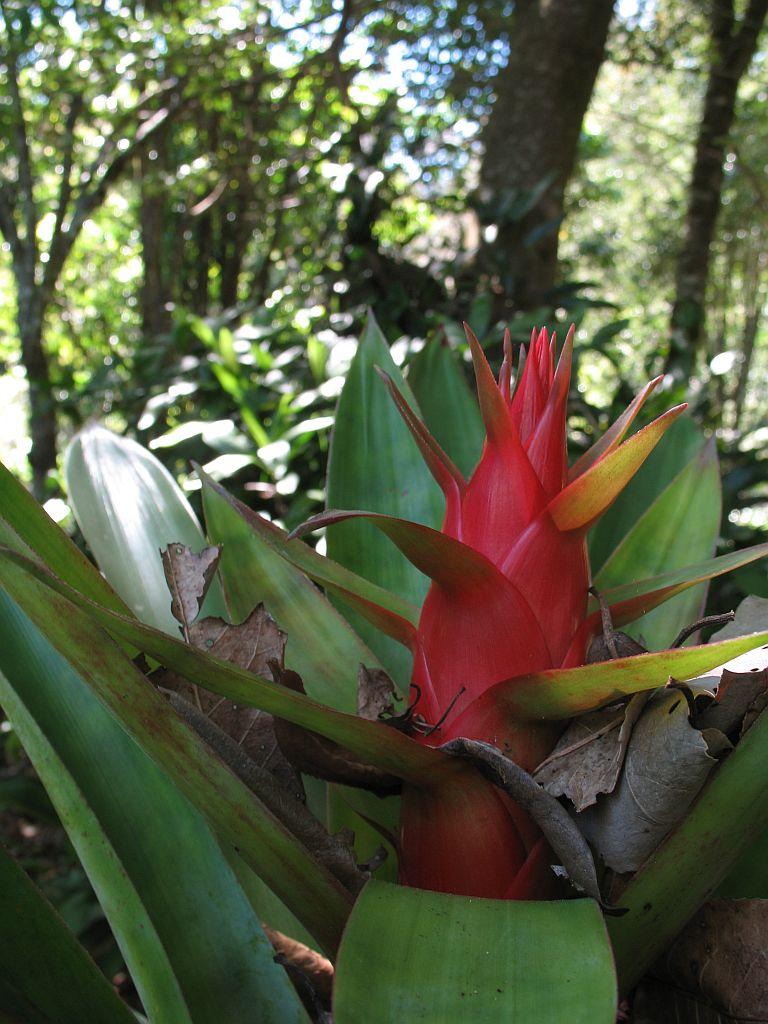

Scientific classification
- Kingdom: Plantae
- Clade: Tracheophytes
- Clade: Angiosperms
- Clade: Monocots
- Clade: Commelinids
- Order: Poales
- Family: Bromeliaceae
- Genus: Tillandsia
- Subgenus: Tillandsia subg. Tillandsia
- Species: T. imperialis

Binomial name
- Tillandsia imperialis E.Morren ex Roezl

= Tillandsia imperialis =

Species of plant

Tillandsia imperialis is an epiphytic species of flowering plant in the genus Tillandsia. This species is endemic to Mexico, specifically the states Hidalgo, Oaxaca, Puebla, Querétaro, and Veracruz, at elevations ranging from 800 to 2,600 meters. Its distribution is generally on the eastern portion of the eastern Sierra Madre Mountains and the eastern portion of the Trans-Mexican Volcanic Belt. This species is primarily epiphytic to the branches and holes of the tree species Pinus patula and Quercus laurina, or on lianas of the same trees, in moist cloud forests. This bromeliad prefers moist conditions and does not tolerate extended periods of drought or low humidity.

T. imperialis was first collected by Europeans in 1866 near Orizaba, Veracruz, and named by Edouard Morren in 1881. Its common name in Mexico is súchil (or xóchil), which is the Classical Nahuatl word for flower. In November and December people from rural areas of Mexico occasionally collect this plant to be used to decorate nativity scenes and religious arches (along with the related bromeliad T. usneoides).

== Cultivars ==
- × Vrieslandsia 'Imperial Charm'
- × Vrieslandsia 'Marichelle'
- × Vrieslandsia 'Red Dawn'
