= Santa Anita metro station =

Mexico City metro station

Santa Anita
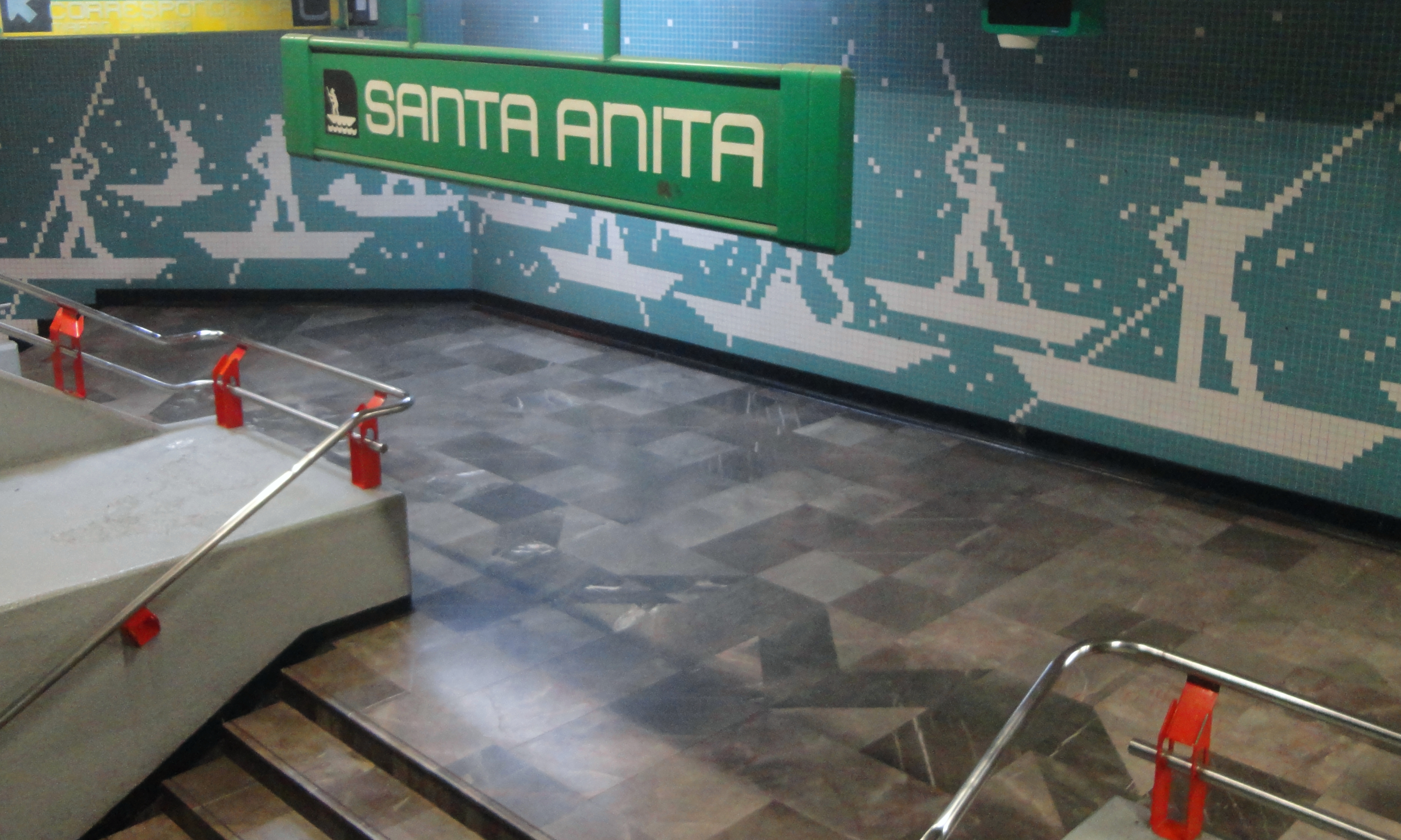
- Stairs leading to Line 8 platforms showing mosaic of men in boats.

General information
- Location: Santa Anita, Iztacalco; Mexico City; Mexico
- Coordinates: 19.40273°N 99.121699°W
- System: Mexico City Metro
- Operator: Sistema de Transporte Colectivo (STC)
- Platforms: 4 side platforms
- Tracks: 4

Construction
- Structure type: At grade Underground
- Parking: No
- Cycle facilities: No

Other information
- Status: In service

History
- Opened: 26 May 1982; 44 years ago 20 July 1994; 32 years ago
- Former names: Plutarco E. Calles (planned)

Passengers
- 2025: Total: 2,116,163; 637,859 (Note: The data here is limited to the most recent ten years to avoid excessive listings; earlier figures can be found in this page's history or on the Mexico City Metro website. To calculate the average daily ridership, the annual total is divided by 365 days (366 in leap years), with decimals omitted from the result. Each station per line is ranked individually, as the system counts transfer stations separately. The percentage change is calculated automatically using the data from the current year and the previous year.); 1,478,304 ▼10.66%
- Rank: 192/195; 185/195

Services
Preceding station	Mexico City Metro	Following station
Jamaica toward Martín Carrera	Line 4	Terminus
La Viga toward Garibaldi / Lagunilla	Line 8	Coyuya toward Constitución de 1917
Route map
Location
- Location within Mexico City
- Area map

Santa Anita is a station on the Mexico City Metro. Located in Mexico City's Iztacalco borough, the station is the current terminal of Line 4.

== General information ==
The station logo depicts a man sailing a canoe. This is because in the early 20th century, in the area where the station now stands, was the Santa Anita canal – a place used for chinampa-based agriculture. Today the canal has long since vanished, but the name Santa Anita is still used by the surrounding neighborhood.

Metro Line 4 was originally projected to end in the Villa Coapa neighborhood, in the southern borough of Coyoacán. Since the inauguration of Line B, however, no more lines have been constructed or extended, so Metro Santa Anita – and other stations, such as Metro Barranca del Muerto – officially remain provisional terminals. Metro Santa Anita is the least busy station on the Mexico City Metro, with only 621,867 passenger boardings in 2008.

Santa Anita was originally to be named "Plutarco E. Calles", in honor of President Plutarco Elías Calles, according to early plans for Line 4.

=== Ridership ===
Annual passenger ridership (Line 4)
Year	Ridership	Average daily	Rank	% change	Ref.
2025	637,859	1,747	192/195	−9.70%
2024	706,344	1,929	186/195	+7.72%
2023	655,751	1,796	185/195	+9.32%
2022	599,848	1,643	174/195	+53.41%
2021	391,005	1,071	193/195	−12.90%
2020	448,927	1,226	194/195	−47.48%
2019	854,706	2,341	194/195	−7.26%
2018	921,610	2,524	194/195	+6.92%
2017	861,992	2,361	194/195	−1.24%
2016	872,802	2,384	193/195	−1.30%

Annual passenger ridership (Line 8)
Year	Ridership	Average daily	Rank	% change	Ref.
2025	1,478,304	4,050	185/195	−11.07%
2024	1,662,234	4,541	175/195	−2.25%
2023	1,700,415	4,658	165/195	+11.62%
2022	1,523,442	4,173	167/195	+48.54%
2021	1,025,639	2,809	174/195	−25.97%
2020	1,385,490	3,875	174/195	−42.34%
2019	2,402,874	6,583	177/195	−2.47%
2018	2,463,841	6,750	176/195	+6.40%
2017	2,315,712	6,344	178/195	−2.01%
2016	2,363,210	6,456	180/195	+0.69%

== Exits ==
=== Line 4 ===
- Avenida Congreso de la Unión between Canal Nacional street and Viaducto Miguel Alemán, Colonia Santa Anita

=== Line 8 ===
- East: Avenida Coyuya and Viaducto Miguel Alemán, Colonia Santa Anita
- West: Avenida Coyuya and Viaducto Miguel Alemán, Colonia Santa Anita
