= Mexibús Line 3 =

Bus rapid transit line in the State of Mexico

Line 3
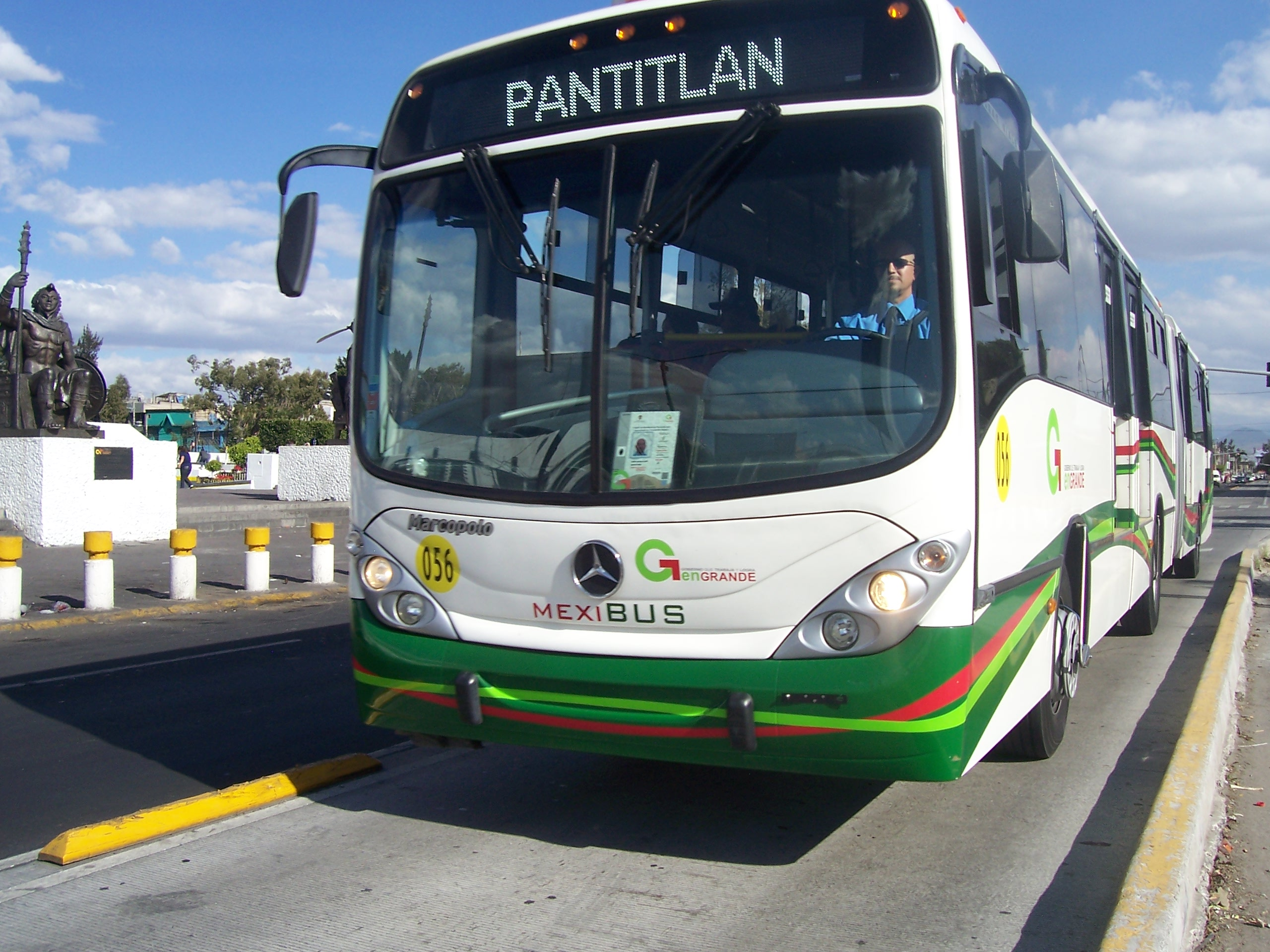
- Mexibús over Avenida Chimalhuacán

Overview
- Status: In service
- Termini: Chimalhuacán / Acuitlapilco; Pantitlán / Rayito de Sol / Chicoloapan
- Stations: 45
- Website: Línea 3

Service
- Type: Bus rapid transit
- System: Mexibús
- Services: 5
- Operator: Red de Transporte de Oriente
- Depot: Chimalhuacán
- Rolling stock: 85

History
- Opened: 30 April 2013; 13 years ago

Technical
- Line length: 23 km (14.3 mi)
- Character: Exclusive right-of-way

The Mexibús Line 3 (also stylized in Roman numbers as III) is a bus rapid transit (BRT) line in the Mexibús system. It was the third line to be built and the second to be opened. It operates between Chimalhuacán, in the State of Mexico and Pantitlán metro station in Iztacalco and Venustiano Carranza, in Mexico City. It was inaugurated by the governor of the State of Mexico, Eruviel Ávila on 30 April 2013 with 29 stations. Another station was opened in 2019. In 2023, an extension was added from Chimalcuacán Municipality to Chicoloapan de Juárez. It is 23 kilometers (14 mi) long. The line operates with 85 articulated buses.

== Stations ==
There are four service variations provided on Pantitlán–Chimalhuacán. The Acuitlapilco–Central de Abasto route has a different type of service and stations layout:

- O: Pantitlán-Chimalhuacán local (27 stops)
- EX-1: Pantitlán-Acuitlapilco express (13 stops)
- EX-2: Pantitlán-Chimalhuacán express (8 stops)
- EX-3: Pantitlán-Rayito de Sol express (8 stops)

Key (Note: The following list was adapted from different websites and official maps.: Metro connections obtained from the official Mexico City Metro system map.; Accessibility obtained from the Mexico City Metro system map. In some cases, the map omits the accessibility icon as the station(s) are actually partially accessible. However, the respective websites of each station on the official site indicate the respective accessibility methods. Stations with the symbol are fully accessible; stations with the symbol are partially accessible.; Cablebús obtained from their official website.; Centro de transferencia modal (CETRAM;) obtained from the official website of the Órgano Regulador de Transporte.; Ecobici obtained from their official website.; Metrobús obtained from the Mexico City Metrobús system map.; Mexibús obtained from the official Mexico City Metro system map.; Mexicable obtained from the official Mexico City Metro system map.; Public buses network (peseros) obtained from the official website of the Órgano Regulador de Transporte.; Red de Transporte de Pasajeros obtained from their official website.; Trolleybuses obtained from their official website.)
Handicapped/disabled access	Fully accessible station	Cablebús Line {{{3}}}	Cablebús connection	Red de Transporte de Pasajeros	RTP connection
Handicapped/disabled access	Partially accessible station	Mexibús	Mexibús connection	Tren Interurbano	Tren Interurbano connection
Transfer hub	CETRAM transfer station	Mexicable	Mexicable connection	Tren Suburbano	Tren Suburbano connection
Transfer hub	ETRAM transfer station	Mexico City Metro	Mexico City Metro connection	Trolleybus	Trolleybus connection
Ecobici	Ecobici bikeshare	Mexico City minubus	Pesero connection	Xochimilco Light Rail	Xochimilco Light Rail connection

=== Pantitlán–Chimalhuacán ===
Station (Note: All the stations are fully accessible to people with disabilities.)	Local	EX-1	EX-2	EX-3	Location	Connection	Picture	Opened
Pantitlán	●	●	●	●	Iztacalco/ Venustiano Carranza, Mexico City	168; 11B, 11C, 19F, 19G		30 April 2013
Calle 6	●			●	Venustiano Carranza, Mexico City	Mexico City Metrobús Mexico City Metrobús Line 4		4 November 2019
El Barquito	●	●		●	Nezahualcóyotl			30 April 2013
Maravillas	●				Nezahualcóyotl			30 April 2013
Vicente Riva Palacio	●	●	●	●	Nezahualcóyotl			30 April 2013
Virgencitas	●				Nezahualcóyotl			30 April 2013
Nezahualcóyotl	●	●			Nezahualcóyotl			30 April 2013
Lago de Chapala	●				Nezahualcóyotl			30 April 2013
Adolfo López Mateos	●	●	●	●	Nezahualcóyotl			30 April 2013
Palacio Municipal	●	●		●	Nezahualcóyotl			30 April 2013
Sor Juana Inés de la Cruz	●				Nezahualcóyotl			30 April 2013
El Castillo	●				Nezahualcóyotl			30 April 2013
General Vicente Villada	●	●	●	●	Nezahualcóyotl			30 April 2013
Rayito de Sol	●	●		●	Nezahualcóyotl			30 April 2013
Las Mañanitas	●				Nezahualcóyotl			30 April 2013
Rancho Grande	●				Nezahualcóyotl			30 April 2013
Bordo de Xochiaca	●				Nezahualcóyotl			30 April 2013
Las Torres	●	●	●		Nezahualcóyotl			30 April 2013
Guerrero Chimalli	●				Chimalhuacán			30 April 2013
Las Flores	●	●			Chimalhuacán			30 April 2013
Canteros	●				Chimalhuacán			30 April 2013
La Presa	●	●	●		Chimalhuacán			30 April 2013
Embarcadero	●				Chimalhuacán			30 April 2013
Santa Elena	●				Chimalhuacán			30 April 2013
Ignacio Manuel Altamirano	●				Chimalhuacán			30 April 2013
San Pablo	●				Chimalhuacán			30 April 2013
Los Patos	●	●	●		Chimalhuacán			30 April 2013
Refugio	●				Chimalhuacán			30 April 2013
Acuitlapilco	●	●			Chimalhuacán	Acuitlapilco–Central de Abasto		30 April 2013
Chimalhuacán	●		●		Chimalhuacán			30 April 2013

=== Acuitlapilco–Central de Abasto ===
Since the Acuitlapilco–Central de Abasto route has several one-way stations, the following table will start at Acutilapilco station and follow an eastward flow until reaching the Central de Abasto Terminal Station, then follow the route westward culminating with the Prolongación Peñón station.

Station	Eastward	Westward	Location	Connection	Picture	Opened
Acuitlapilco	●	●	Chimalhuacán	Pantitlán–Chimalhuacán service		24 March 2023
San Miguel	●		Chimalhuacán			24 March 2023
Arca de Noé	●		Chimalhuacán			24 March 2023
Tláloc	●		Chimalhuacán			24 March 2023
Las Fuentes	●		Chimalhuacán			24 March 2023
Santa María Nativitas	●		Chimalhuacán			24 March 2023
Lagunilla	●		Chimalhuacán			24 March 2023
Chicoloapan	●		Chicoloapan de Juárez			24 March 2023
Central de Abasto	●	●	Chicoloapan de Juárez			24 March 2023
Benito Juárez		●	Chicoloapan de Juárez			24 March 2023
Recinto Ferial		●	Chimalhuacán			24 March 2023
Camino Viejo		●	Chimalhuacán			24 March 2023
Tequesquite		●	Chimalhuacán			24 March 2023
Cuauhtémoc		●	Chimalhuacán			24 March 2023
Ciudad Alegre		●	Chimalhuacán			24 March 2023
Prolongación Peñón		●	Chimalhuacán			24 March 2023
