= Mexibús Line 4 =

Bus rapid transit line in the State of Mexico

Line 4
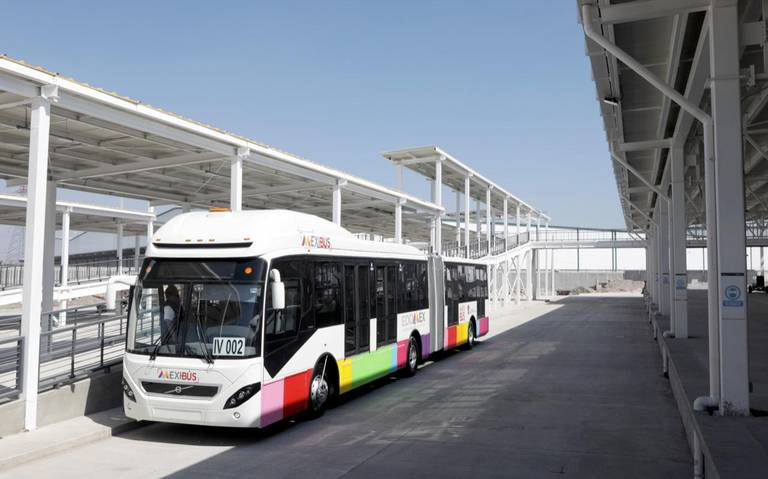
- Universidad Mexiquense del Bicentenario station

Overview
- Status: In service
- Termini: Universidad Mexiquense del Bicentenario; La Raza
- Stations: 30
- Website: Línea 4

Service
- Type: Bus rapid transit
- System: Mexibús
- Services: 2
- Operator: Transmasivo
- Depot: Universidad Mexiquense del Bicentenario
- Rolling stock: 71

History
- Opened: 24 February 2021; 5 years ago

Technical
- Line length: 22.3 km (13.9 mi)
- Character: Exclusive right-of-way

The Mexibús Line 4 (also stylized in Roman numbers as IV) is a bus rapid transit (BRT) line in the Mexibús system. It operates between the Universidad Mexiquense del Bicentenario (UMB) in Tecámac, State of Mexico, and La Raza metro station in Gustavo A. Madero, Mexico City. It was the fourth line to be built and the fourth to be opened. It was inaugurated by the governor of the State of Mexico, Alfredo del Mazo Maza on 24 February 2021. It has 30 operative stations. It is 22.3 kilometers (13.9 mi) long. The line has two different types of services, and both include a service exclusively for women and children named Servicio Rosa (Pink Service). The line operates with 71 buses.

While the line was under construction, Line II provided a provisional route from Las Américas to Indios Verdes.

== History and construction ==
The line began construction in June 2014, and was expected to open since 2015. It started free pre-operative tests on 24 February 2021. Operations started on 9 October 2021.

On April 7, 2024, the southern expansion from the Indios Verdes station to the La Raza metro station station came into operation.

== Stations ==
Key (Note: The following list was adapted from different websites and official maps.: Metro connections obtained from the official Mexico City Metro system map.; Accessibility obtained from the Mexico City Metro system map. In some cases, the map omits the accessibility icon as the station(s) are actually partially accessible. However, the respective websites of each station on the official site indicate the respective accessibility methods. Stations with the symbol are fully accessible; stations with the symbol are partially accessible.; Cablebús obtained from their official website.; Centro de transferencia modal (CETRAM;) obtained from the official website of the Órgano Regulador de Transporte.; Ecobici obtained from their official website.; Metrobús obtained from the Mexico City Metrobús system map.; Mexibús obtained from the official Mexico City Metro system map.; Mexicable obtained from the official Mexico City Metro system map.; Public buses network (peseros) obtained from the official website of the Órgano Regulador de Transporte.; Red de Transporte de Pasajeros obtained from their official website.; Trolleybuses obtained from their official website.)
Handicapped/disabled access	Fully accessible station	Cablebús Line {{{3}}}	Cablebús connection	Red de Transporte de Pasajeros	RTP connection
Handicapped/disabled access	Partially accessible station	Mexibús	Mexibús connection	Tren Interurbano	Tren Interurbano connection
Transfer hub	CETRAM transfer station	Mexicable	Mexicable connection	Tren Suburbano	Tren Suburbano connection
Transfer hub	ETRAM transfer station	Mexico City Metro	Mexico City Metro connection	Trolleybus	Trolleybus connection
Ecobici	Ecobici bikeshare	Mexico City minubus	Pesero connection	Mexico City Light Rail	Mexico City Light Rail connection

Station (Note: All the stations are fully accessible to people with disabilities, except Cerro Gordo.)	Local	Express	Location	Connection	Picture	Opened
La Raza	●		Gustavo A. Madero, Mexico City	11A (at distance), 12 (at distance), 23, 27A, 103; 7D (at distance)		7 April 2024
Indios Verdes (Note: New station in operation from April 7, 2024.)	●	●	Gustavo A. Madero, Mexico City	101, 101A, 101B, 101D, 102, 107B (at distance), 108		24 February 2021
Periférico	●	●	Tlalnepantla de Baz	Mexicable Mexicable Line 2		24 February 2021
Martín Carrera	●		Tlalnepantla de Baz			24 February 2021
Clínica 76	●	●	Ecatepec de Morelos			24 February 2021
Vía Morelos	●		Ecatepec de Morelos			24 February 2021
Monumento a Morelos	●		Ecatepec de Morelos			24 February 2021
5 de Febrero	●		Ecatepec de Morelos			24 February 2021
Santa Clara	●	●	Ecatepec de Morelos	Mexicable Mexicable Line 1		24 February 2021
Cerro Gordo	●		Ecatepec de Morelos			24 February 2021
Servicios Administrativos	●		Ecatepec de Morelos			24 February 2021
Clínica 93	●	●	Ecatepec de Morelos			24 February 2021
Industrial	●		Ecatepec de Morelos			24 February 2021
5ta. Aparición	●		Ecatepec de Morelos			24 February 2021
Tulpetlac	●	●	Ecatepec de Morelos			24 February 2021
Siervo de la Nación	●		Ecatepec de Morelos			24 February 2021
Nuevo Laredo	●	●	Ecatepec de Morelos			24 February 2021
Laureles	●		Ecatepec de Morelos			24 February 2021
La Viga	●		Ecatepec de Morelos			24 February 2021
San Cristóbal	●		Ecatepec de Morelos			24 February 2021
Puente de Fierro	●	●	Ecatepec de Morelos	Mexibús Line 2		24 February 2021
Izcalli Palomas	●		Ecatepec de Morelos			9 October 2021
Central de Abastos	●	●	Ecatepec de Morelos	Mexibús Mexibús Line 1		9 October 2021
Santa María Chiconautla	●		Ecatepec de Morelos			27 May 2023
Ejido Santo Tomás	●		Ecatepec de Morelos			9 October 2021
Revolución	●		Ecatepec de Morelos			9 October 2021
Margarito F. Ayala	●		Tecámac			9 October 2021
Flores	●	●	Tecámac			9 October 2021
Bosques	●		Tecámac			9 October 2021
Universidad Mexiquense del Bicentenario	●	●	Tecámac			9 October 2021

=== Expansion ===
The line is expected to connect with Felipe Ángeles International Airport, in Zumpango Municipality to the north.
