= Mexibús Line 2 =

Bus rapid transit line in the State of Mexico

Line 2
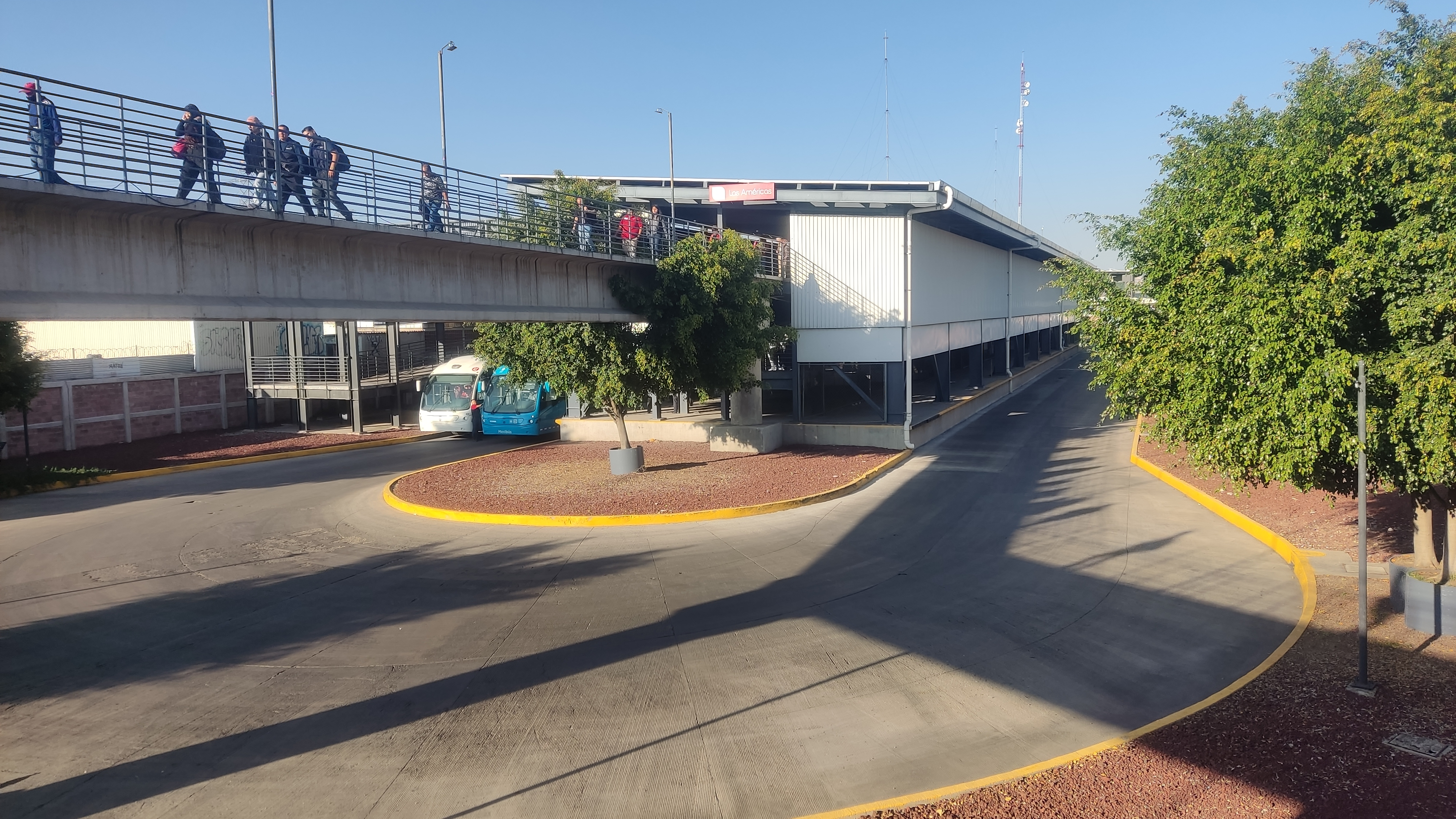
- Las Américas terminal station

Overview
- Status: In service
- Termini: Las Américas / Lechería; La Quebrada / Ecatepec / Río de los Remedios
- Stations: 53
- Website: Línea 2

Service
- Type: Bus rapid transit
- System: Mexibús
- Services: 2
- Operator(s): Transcomunicador
- Depot(s): Las Américas
- Rolling stock: 103

History
- Opened: 12 January 2015; 11 years ago

Technical
- Line length: 56.3 km (35.0 mi)
- Character: Exclusive right-of-way

The Mexibús Line 2 (also stylized in Roman numbers as II) is a bus rapid transit (BRT) line in the Mexibús system. It operates between La Quebrada in Cuautitlán Izcalli and Las Américas in Ecatepec de Morelos. It was the second line to be built and the third to be opened. It was inaugurated by the governor of the State of Mexico, Eruviel Ávila on 12 January 2015 with 43 stations. It is 21.3 kilometers (13.2 mi) long. The line has two different types of services, and both include a service exclusively for women and children named Servicio Rosa (Pink Service). The line operates with 97 buses. On 8 October 2018, the Servicio Exprés was opened, going from Lechería to Ecatepec stations.

Until 15 December 2020, the line provided a provisional route from Las Américas to Indios Verdes metro station and it was later replaced with Line IV.

On 4 March 2024, the state government opened a branch line that connects Las Américas station with the Río de los Remedios BRT station of the Mexico City Metrobús, in Northeastern Mexico City. It is 35 km (22 mi) long.

== Stations ==
Key (Note: The following list was adapted from different websites and official maps.: Metro connections obtained from the official Mexico City Metro system map.; Accessibility obtained from the Mexico City Metro system map. In some cases, the map omits the accessibility icon as the station(s) are actually partially accessible. However, the respective websites of each station on the official site indicate the respective accessibility methods. Stations with the symbol ‡ are fully accessible; stations with the symbol † are partially accessible.; Cablebús obtained from their official website.; Centro de transferencia modal (CETRAM;) obtained from the official website of the Órgano Regulador de Transporte.; Ecobici obtained from their official website.; Metrobús obtained from the Mexico City Metrobús system map.; Mexibús obtained from the official Mexico City Metro system map.; Mexicable obtained from the official Mexico City Metro system map.; Public buses network (peseros) obtained from the official website of the Órgano Regulador de Transporte.; Red de Transporte de Pasajeros obtained from their official website.; Trolleybuses obtained from their official website.)
Handicapped/disabled access	Fully accessible station	Cablebús Line {{{3}}}	Cablebús connection	Red de Transporte de Pasajeros	RTP connection
Handicapped/disabled access	Partially accessible station	Mexibús	Mexibús connection	Tren Interurbano	Tren Interurbano connection
Transfer hub	CETRAM transfer station	Mexicable	Mexicable connection	Tren Suburbano	Tren Suburbano connection
Transfer hub	ETRAM transfer station	Mexico City Metro	Mexico City Metro connection	Trolleybus	Trolleybus connection
Ecobici	Ecobici bikeshare	Mexico City minubus	Pesero connection	Xochimilco Light Rail	Xochimilco Light Rail connection

Station	Handicapped/disabled access	Local	Express	Location	Connection	Picture	Opened
Las Américas	Handicapped/disabled access	●		Ecatepec de Morelos	(at 1° de mayo)		12 January 2015
1° de Mayo	Handicapped/disabled access	●		Ecatepec de Morelos			12 January 2015
San Martín	Handicapped/disabled access	●		Ecatepec de Morelos			12 January 2015
Puente de Fierro	Handicapped/disabled access	●		Ecatepec de Morelos	Mexibús Mexibús Line 4		12 January 2015
Casa de Morelos	Handicapped/disabled access	●		Ecatepec de Morelos			12 January 2015
UPE	Handicapped/disabled access	●		Ecatepec de Morelos			12 January 2015
San Cristóbal	Handicapped/disabled access	●		Ecatepec de Morelos			12 January 2015
Agricultura	Handicapped/disabled access	●		Ecatepec de Morelos			12 January 2015
ISSEMYM	Handicapped/disabled access	●		Ecatepec de Morelos			12 January 2015
El Carmen	Handicapped/disabled access	●		Ecatepec de Morelos			12 January 2015
Ecatepec	Handicapped/disabled access	●	●	Ecatepec de Morelos			12 January 2015
DIF	Handicapped/disabled access	●	●	Ecatepec de Morelos			12 January 2015
Guadalupe Victoria	Handicapped/disabled access	●	●	Ecatepec de Morelos			12 January 2015
Venustiano Carranza	Handicapped/disabled access	●		Ecatepec de Morelos			12 January 2015
FOVISSSTE	Handicapped/disabled access	●	●	Ecatepec de Morelos			12 January 2015
San Carlos	Handicapped/disabled access	●		Ecatepec de Morelos			12 January 2015
La Laguna	Handicapped/disabled access	●	●	Coacalco de Berriozábal			12 January 2015
Parque Residencial	Handicapped/disabled access	●	●	Coacalco de Berriozábal			12 January 2015
Eje 8	Handicapped/disabled access	●	●	Coacalco de Berriozábal			12 January 2015
1ª de Villa	Handicapped/disabled access	●	●	Coacalco de Berriozábal			12 January 2015
Las Flores Zacuautitla	Handicapped/disabled access	●	●	Coacalco de Berriozábal			12 January 2015
San Francisco	Handicapped/disabled access	●	●	Coacalco de Berriozábal			12 January 2015
Héroes-Canosas	Handicapped/disabled access	●	●	Coacalco de Berriozábal			12 January 2015
Coacalco-Tultepec	Handicapped/disabled access	●	●	Coacalco de Berriozábal			12 January 2015
Ex Hacienda San Felipe	Handicapped/disabled access	●		Coacalco de Berriozábal			12 January 2015
Bosques del Valle	Handicapped/disabled access	●	●	Coacalco de Berriozábal			12 January 2015
Coacalco Berriozábal	Handicapped/disabled access	●	●	Coacalco de Berriozábal			12 January 2015
Santa María	Handicapped/disabled access	●		Tultitlán de Mariano Escobedo			12 January 2015
Villas de San José	Handicapped/disabled access	●	●	Tultitlán de Mariano Escobedo			12 January 2015
Mariscala Real del Bosque	Handicapped/disabled access	●	●	Tultitlán de Mariano Escobedo			12 January 2015
Fuentes del Valle	Handicapped/disabled access	●	●	Tultitlán de Mariano Escobedo			12 January 2015
De la Cruz San Mateo	Handicapped/disabled access	●		Tultitlán de Mariano Escobedo			12 January 2015
Cartagena	Handicapped/disabled access	●	●	Tultitlán de Mariano Escobedo			12 January 2015
Bello Horizonte	Handicapped/disabled access	●		Tultitlán de Mariano Escobedo			12 January 2015
Bandera/Tultitlán	Handicapped/disabled access	●	●	Tultitlán de Mariano Escobedo			12 January 2015
Buenavista	Handicapped/disabled access	●		Tultitlán de Mariano Escobedo			12 January 2015
COCEM	Handicapped/disabled access	●		Tultitlán de Mariano Escobedo			12 January 2015
Recursos Hidráulicos	Handicapped/disabled access	●		Tultitlán de Mariano Escobedo			12 January 2015
Chilpan	Handicapped/disabled access	●	●	Tultitlán de Mariano Escobedo			12 January 2015
Ciudad Labor	Handicapped/disabled access	●		Tultitlán de Mariano Escobedo			12 January 2015
Vidriera	Handicapped/disabled access	●		Tultitlán de Mariano Escobedo			12 January 2015
Lechería	Handicapped/disabled access	●		Tultitlán de Mariano Escobedo	Tren Suburbano Tren Suburbano Line 1		12 January 2015
Estación Retorno Oriente (Note: Otherwise known as the express service-only Lechería station; also abbreviated as ERO.)	Handicapped/disabled access		●	Tultitlán de Mariano Escobedo	Tren Suburbano Tren Suburbano Line 1		8 October 2018
La Quebrada	Handicapped/disabled access	●		Cuautitlán Izcalli			12 January 2015

=== Line 2A ===
On 29 February 2024, the state government opened a branch line that connects Las Américas station with the Río de los Remedios BRT station of the Mexico City Metrobús, on Line 5, in Northeastern Mexico City. The line is 35 km (22 mi) long and it operates with 10 electric buses.

Since the Las Américas–Río de los Remedios route has several one-way stations, the following table will start at Las Américas station and follow an southward flow until reaching the Río de los Remedios station, then follow the route northward ending with the Libertadores de América station.

Station	Handicapped/disabled access	Southbound	Northbound	Location	Connection	Picture	Opened
Las Américas	Handicapped/disabled access	●	●	Ecatepec de Morelos	(at 1° de mayo)		29 February 2024
Veracruz	Handicapped/disabled access	●		Ecatepec de Morelos			29 February 2024
Matamoros	Handicapped/disabled access	●		Ecatepec de Morelos	(at Hospital)		29 February 2024
Jardines de Morelos	Handicapped/disabled access	●		Ecatepec de Morelos	(at Jardines de Morelos)		4 May 2026
Monumento a la Familia	Handicapped/disabled access	●		Ecatepec de Morelos	(at Jardines de Morelos)		29 February 2024
Río de los Remedios	Handicapped/disabled access	●	●	Gustavo A. Madero	Mexico City Metrobús Mexico City Metrobús Line 5		29 February 2024
León de los Aldama	Handicapped/disabled access		●	Gustavo A. Madero			29 February 2024
Centro Cultural	Handicapped/disabled access		●	Ecatepec de Morelos			29 February 2024
Paseo Ventura	Handicapped/disabled access		●	Ecatepec de Morelos			29 February 2024
Libertadores de América	Handicapped/disabled access		●	Ecatepec de Morelos			29 February 2024

== Incidents ==
On 12 April 2021, at 5:30 hours, a driver crashed into the turnstiles of FOVISSSTE station on Line 2. The station was empty and only the driver resulted injured.

On 18 April 2026, a fire on the Siervo de la Nación Highway, where the service operates to reach Río de los Remedios, caused structural deformations in an overpass, leading to the indefinite closure of the highway and the suspension of service. The service resumed the next day, but via an alternate route along Circuito Exterior Mexiquense instead.
