= Centro de transferencia modal =

Centro de Transferencia Modal (CETRAM)
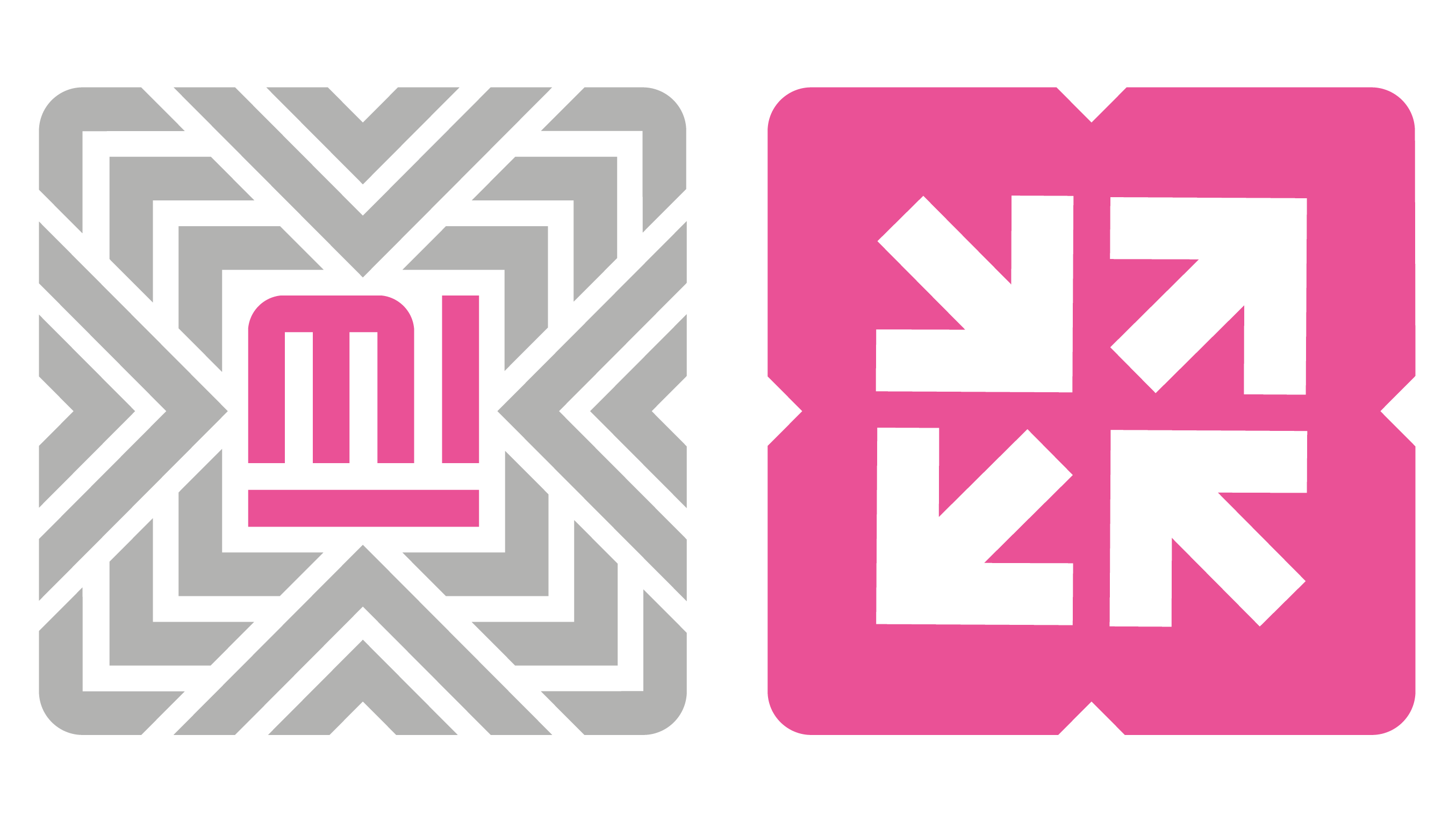

Overview
- Number of stations: 40 (Mexico City)
- Key people: Natalia Rivera Hoyos (general director)
- Website: ort.cdmx.gob.mx

Operation
- Operator: Organismo Regulador de Transporte

A centro de transferencia modal (English: Modal Transfer Center; abbreviated as CETRAM), is a type of transportation hub found mainly in Mexico City. Locally known as paraderos (English: bus or rail terminal stops), these intermodal passenger transport stations allow commuters to transfer between different modes of public transit, generally between rail and bus systems. In Mexico City, their operations are supervised by Organismo Regulador de Transporte (ORT). Since 14 December 2010, the hubs became part of a decentralized organization. Out of the 40 operative CETRAMs existing in the city, 33 are found adjacent to Mexico City Metro stations.

Outside the city, they are also found in Guadalajara, Jalisco (known as Centro de Transferencia Multimodal; Multimodal Transfer Center), and in the State of Mexico, where they are known as estación de transferencia modal (English: Modal Transfer Station; abbreviated as ETRAM).

== History ==
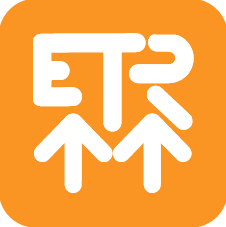
Logo for the ETRAM system in the State of Mexico

The hubs were created in 1969 to complement the Mexico City Metro system. They were originally operated by the system. Around 1970, as a result of the construction of intercity bus terminals and highways, bus stops and routes began to proliferate, thanks to the opening of new Metro stations. At the beginning of 1980, with the increase in the demand for transportation, the proliferation of peseros –share taxis– began to proliferate. In 1983, the General Coordination of Transportation was created. In 1993, the control of the bus stops remained in the hands of the political delegations, but the following year the control passed to the General Coordination of Transportation. In 1995, it was renamed the Secretariat of Transportation and Roads (SETRAVI) (and later was renamed the Secretariat of Mobility or SEMOVI). SETRAVI was created as a result of the economic crisis of that year. Due to the dissolution of the state-owned company Autotransportes Urbanos de Pasajeros Ruta 100 (colloquially known as Ruta 100), it was decided to grant the transportation concession to private companies, thus decreeing a Transportation Law. Between 1996 and 2002, the control of the CETRAMs changes from one agency to another within SETRAVI, until it ends up being administered by the General Directorate of Transportation Regulation. By 14 December 2010, the CETRAMs were decentralized and their operations were transferred to the Organismo Regulador de Transporte (ORT).

Since its decentralization, multiple CETRAMs have been renovated, including those at Cuatro Caminos and Ciudad Azteca stations, or are under renovations, including at Indios Verdes, San Lázaro and Martín Carrera stations.

== List of modal transfer centers ==
Key (Note: The following list was adapted from different websites and official maps.: Metro connections obtained from the official Mexico City Metro system map.; Accessibility obtained from the Mexico City Metro system map. In some cases, the map omits the accessibility icon as the station(s) are actually partially accessible. However, the respective websites of each station on the official site indicate the respective accessibility methods. Stations with the symbol are fully accessible; stations with the symbol are partially accessible.; Cablebús obtained from their official website.; Centro de transferencia modal (CETRAM;) obtained from the official website of the Órgano Regulador de Transporte.; Ecobici obtained from their official website.; Metrobús obtained from the Mexico City Metrobús system map.; Mexibús obtained from the official Mexico City Metro system map.; Mexicable obtained from the official Mexico City Metro system map.; Public buses network (peseros) obtained from the official website of the Órgano Regulador de Transporte.; Red de Transporte de Pasajeros obtained from their official website.; Trolleybuses obtained from their official website.)
Handicapped/disabled access	Fully accessible station	Cablebús Line {{{3}}}	Cablebús connection	Red de Transporte de Pasajeros	RTP connection
Handicapped/disabled access	Partially accessible station	Mexibús	Mexibús connection	Tren Interurbano	Tren Interurbano connection
Transfer hub	CETRAM transfer station	Mexicable	Mexicable connection	Tren Suburbano	Tren Suburbano connection
Transfer hub	ETRAM transfer station	Mexico City Metro	Mexico City Metro connection	Trolleybus	Trolleybus connection
Ecobici	Ecobici bikeshare	Mexico City minubus	Pesero connection	Mexico City Light Rail	Mexico City Light Rail connection

CETRAM of México City
CETRAM	Services	Connections	Location	Borough
Barranca del Muerto	Barranca del Muerto metro station	Mexico City Metro RTP Public buses	Av. Revolución, Colonia Los Alpes	Álvaro Obregón
Doctor Gálvez	Doctor Gálvez bus station	Public buses	Between Av. Revolución and Av. Insurgentes Sur, Colonia San Ángel	Álvaro Obregón
Observatorio	Observatorio metro station	Bus interchange Mexico City Metro Public buses	Calzada Minas de Arena, Colonia Cove	Álvaro Obregón
Fortuna	Fortuna railway station	Tren Suburbano Mexico City Metro	Av. Fortuna, Colonia Industrial Vallejo	Azcapotzalco
Refinería	Refinería metro station	Mexico City Metro RTP Public buses	Av. 5 de Mayo and Av. Aquiles Serdán, Colonia Ángel Zimbrón	Azcapotzalco
El Rosario	El Rosario metro station	Mexico City Metro Metrobús RTP Public buses Trolleybus	Av. El Rosario and Av. de las Culturas, Colonia Ex-Ejidos del Rosario	Azcapotzalco
Mixcoac	Mixcoac metro station	Ecobici RTP Trolleybus Public buses	Av. Extremadura and Av. Revolución, Colonia Mixcoac	Benito Juárez
Zapata	Zapata metro station	Ecobici Mexico City Metro Metrobús RTP Trolleybus Public buses	Av. Municipio Libre and Av. Universidad, Colonia Santa Cruz Atoyac	Benito Juárez
Tasqueña	Tasqueña metro station	Bus interchange Mexico City Metro RTP Trolleybus Public buses Light train Light rail interchange	Calzada Tasqueña and Canal de Miramontes, Colonia Campestre Churubusco	Coyoacán
Universidad	Universidad metro station	Bus interchange Mexico City Metro RTP Trolleybus Public buses	Av. Antonio Delfín Madrigal, Av. Pedro Henríquez Ureña and Av. Aztecas, Colonia Pedregal de Santo Domingo	Coyoacán
Buenavista	Buenavista metro station	Ecobici Mexico City Metro Metrobús Tren Suburbano Public buses	Av. Mosqueta, Colonia Buenavista	Cuauhtémoc
Chapultepec	Chapultepec metro station	Ecobici Mexico City Metro Metrobús RTP Trolleybus Public buses	Av. Chapultepec, Colonia Condesa	Cuauhtémoc
Nezahualcóyotl	Pino Suárez metro station	Ecobici Mexico City Metro Metrobús RTP Public buses	Calzada de Tlalpan, Colonia Tránsito	Cuauhtémoc
Deportivo 18 de Marzo	Deportivo 18 de Marzo metro station	Mexico City Metro Metrobús Public buses	Av. Insurgentes Norte, Colonia Lindavista and Colonia Tepeyac Insurgentes	Gustavo A. Madero
Indios Verdes	Indios Verdes metro station	Cablebús Mexico City Metro Metrobús Mexibús Mexicable RTP Public buses	Av. Insurgentes Norte and Calzada Ticomán, Colonia Residencial Zacatenco	Gustavo A. Madero
Martín Carrera	Martín Carrera metro station	Mexico City Metro Metrobús RTP Trolleybus Public buses	Av. San Juan de Aragón and Av. Ferrocarril Hidalgo, Colonia Martin Carrera	Gustavo A. Madero
Politécnico	Politécnico metro station	Mexico City Metro RTP Trolleybus	Av. 100 metros, Colonia Lindavista-Vallejo	Gustavo A. Madero
Potrero	Potrero metro station	Mexico City Metro Metrobús RTP Public buses	Av. Insurgentes Norte, Colonia Industrial and Colonia Caputitlán	Gustavo A. Madero
La Raza	La Raza metro station	Mexico City Metro Metrobús Mexibús RTP Public buses	Av. Insurgentes Norte, Colonia Guadalupe Victoria	Gustavo A. Madero
Villa Cantera	Hospital Pediátrico La Villa	Metrobús RTP Trolleybus	Av. Hidalgo, Colonia Villa Gustavo A. Madero	Gustavo A. Madero
Central de Abastos	Central de Abastos	RTP Public buses	Av. Trabajadoras Sociales and Av. Javier Rojo Gómez, Colonia Central de Abastos Oriente	Iztapalapa
Constitución de 1917	Constitución de 1917 metro station	Cablebús Mexico City Metro RTP Trolleybus Public buses	Calzada Ermita-Iztapalapa, Colonia Los Ángeles	Iztapalapa
Iztapalapa	Iztapalapa metro station	Mexico City Metro RTP Trolleybus Public buses	Calzada Ermita-Iztapalapa, Colonia Barrio San Lucas	Iztapalapa
Periférico Oriente	Periférico Oriente metro station	Mexico City Metro RTP Trolleybus	Av. Tláhuac and Periférico Oriente	Iztapalapa
Santa Marta	Santa Marta metro station	Cablebús Mexico City Metro RTP Trolleybus	Carretera México-Puebla, Colonia Santa Marta Acatitla	Iztapalapa
Tepalcates	Tepalcates metro station	Mexico City Metro Metrobús RTP Public buses	Calzada Ignacio Zaragoza, Colonia Unidad Habitacional Tepalcates	Iztapalapa
Coyuya	Coyuya metro station	Mexico City Metro Metrobús Public buses	Av. Plutarco Elías Calles and Av. Francisco del Paso y Troncoso, Colonia Recreo	Iztacalco
Tacuba	Tacuba metro station	Mexico City Metro RTP Public buses	Av. Marina Nacional and Calzada México-Tacuba, Colonia Tacuba	Miguel Hidalgo
Tacubaya	Tacubaya metro station	Ecobici Mexico City Metro Metrobús RTP Public buses	Av. Carlos Lazo, Av. Jalisco and Av. Parque Lira, Colonia Tacubaya	Miguel Hidalgo
Tláhuac	Tláhuac metro station	Mexico City Metro RTP Public buses	Av. San Rafael Atlixco, Colonia Santa Cecilia	Tláhuac
Huipulco	Estadio Azteca light rail station	RTP Trolleybus Public buses Light train Light rail interchange	Calzada de Tlalpan, Colonia San Lorenzo Huipulco	Tlalpan
Balbuena	Balbuena metro station	Mexico City Metro Public buses	Calzada Ignacio Zaragoza, Colonia Ignacio Zaragoza	Venustiano Carranza
Moctezuma	Moctezuma metro station	Mexico City Metro Metrobús Public buses	Calzada Ignacio Zaragoza and Av. Waldo Martín del Campo, Colonia Moctezuma 1a. Sección	Venustiano Carranza
Pantitlán	Pantitlán metro station	Mexico City Metro Metrobús Mexibús RTP Trolleybus Public buses	Av. Río Churubusco and Av. Miguel Lebrija, Colonia Ampliación Adolfo López Mateos	Venustiano Carranza
Puerto Aéreo	Boulevard Puerto Aéreo metro station	Mexico City Metro RTP Trolleybus Public buses	Circuito Interior	Venustiano Carranza
San Lázaro	San Lázaro metro station	Mexico City Metro Metrobús	Av. Eduardo Molina and Calzada Ignacio Zaragoza, Colonia 7 de Julio	Venustiano Carranza
Zaragoza	Zaragoza metro station	Mexico City Metro RTP	Calzada Ignacio Zaragoza, Colonia Aviación Civil and Colonia Cuatro Árboles	Venustiano Carranza
Deportivo Xochimilco	Deportivo Xochimilco	RTP	Av. Prolongación 16 de Septiembre, Colonia Barrio San Pedro	Xochimilco
Xochimilco	Xochimilco railway station	RTP Light train Light rail interchange	Av. Cuauhtémoc and Prolongación División del Norte, Colonia Barrio San Marcos	Xochimilco
ETRAM in the State of Mexico
ETRAM	Services	Connections	Location	Municipality
Cuautitlán	Cuautitlán railway station	Tren Suburbano	Av. Ferronales, Colonia Paseos de Cuautitlán	Cuautitlán
La Quebrada	La Quebrada bus station	Mexibús Public buses	Av. Gustavo Baz, Colonia Santa María Guadalupe	Cuautitlán Izcalli
1° de Mayo	Centro Comercial Las Américas	Mexibús Public buses	Av. 1° de Mayo, Colonia Las Américas	Ecatepec de Morelos
Central de Abastos	Central de Abastos	Mexibús Public buses	Autopista México-Texcoc, Colonia Santa Cruz Venta de Carpio	Ecatepec de Morelos
Ciudad Azteca	Ciudad Azteca metro station	Mexico City Metro Mexibús Public buses	Av. Cegor and Av. Carlos Hank González, Colonia San Agustín	Ecatepec de Morelos
Jardines de Morelos	Jardines de Morelos bus station	Mexibús Public buses	Av. Central, Colonia Jardines de Morelos	Ecatepec de Morelos
Cuatro Caminos	Cuatro Caminos metro station	Mexico City Metro RTP Trolleybus Public buses	Av. Transmisiones Militares and Av. Ingenieros militares, Colonia Argentina Poniente	Naucalpan de Juárez
La Paz	La Paz metro station	Mexico City Metro Public buses	Av. Puebla, Colonia Villas de la Paz	La Paz
Lechería	Lechería railway station	Tren Suburbano Mexibús Public buses	Av. del Parque, Colonia Buenavista	Tultitlán
Tultitlán	Tultitlán railway station	Tren Suburbano Public buses	Temascalcingo Street, Colonia La Acocila	Tultitlán
San Rafael	San Rafael railway station	Tren Suburbano Public buses	Prolongación de Avenida Hidalgo, Colonia Tlayapa	Tlalnepantla
Tlalnepantla	Tlalnepantla railway station	Tren Suburbano Public buses	Av. Mario Colín, Colonia Valle Ceylán	Tlalnepantla
CETRAM in Jalisco
CETRAM	Services	Connections	Location	Municipality
La Normal	La Normal railway station	Guadalajara light rail system	Av. de los Maestros, Colonia Alcalde Barranquitas	Guadalajara

== Gallery ==
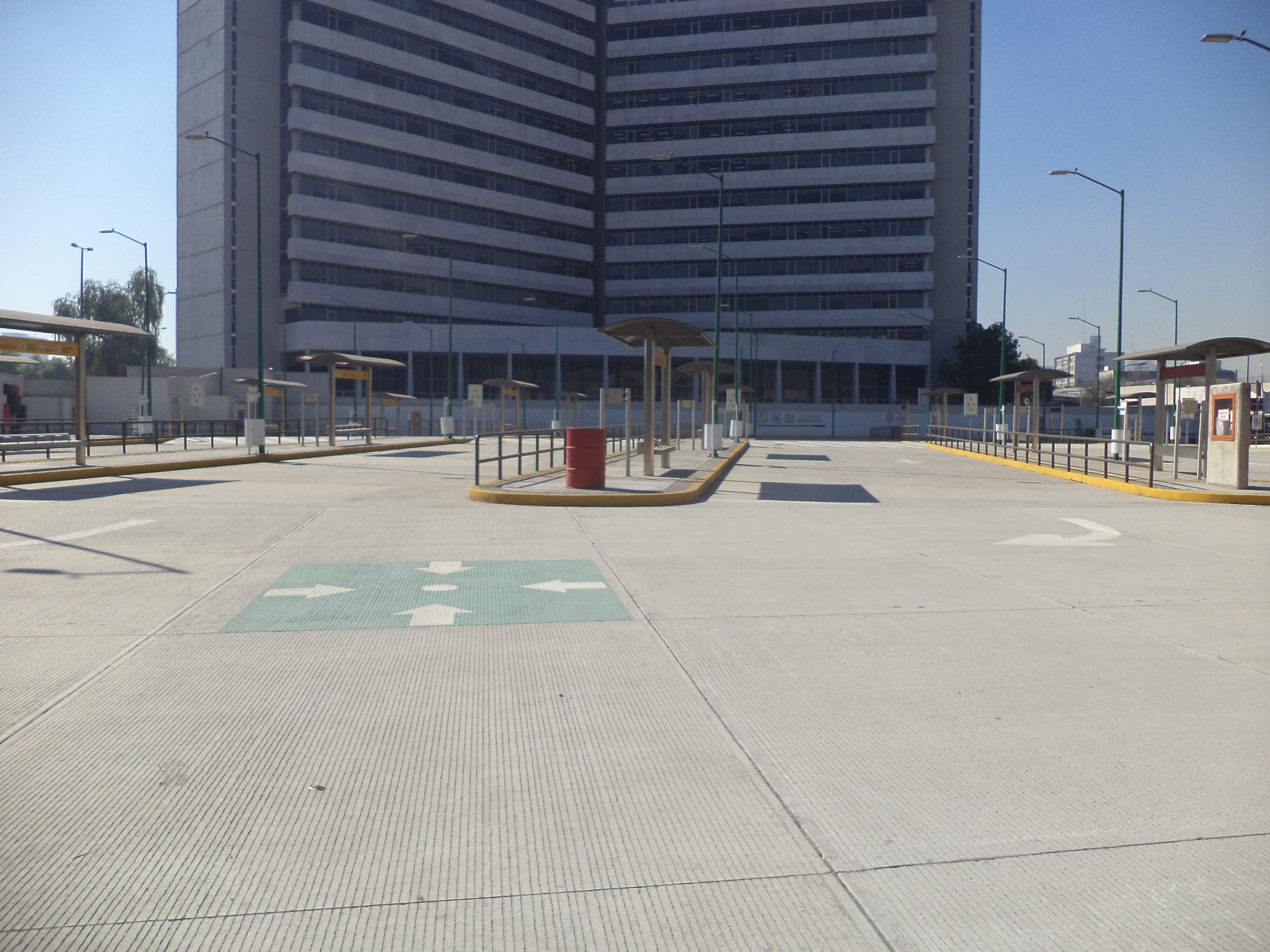
CETRAM Buenavista

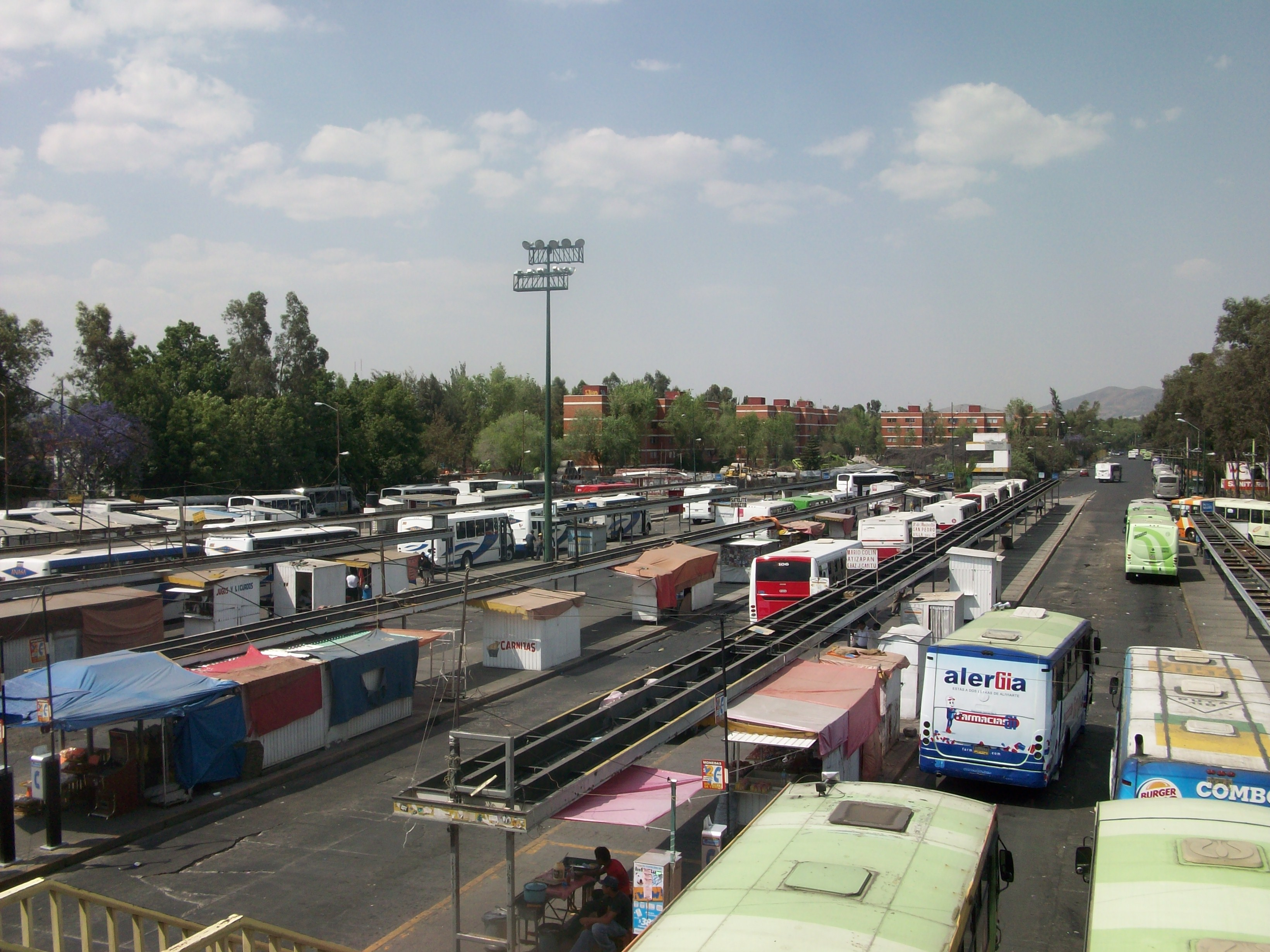
CETRAM El Rosario

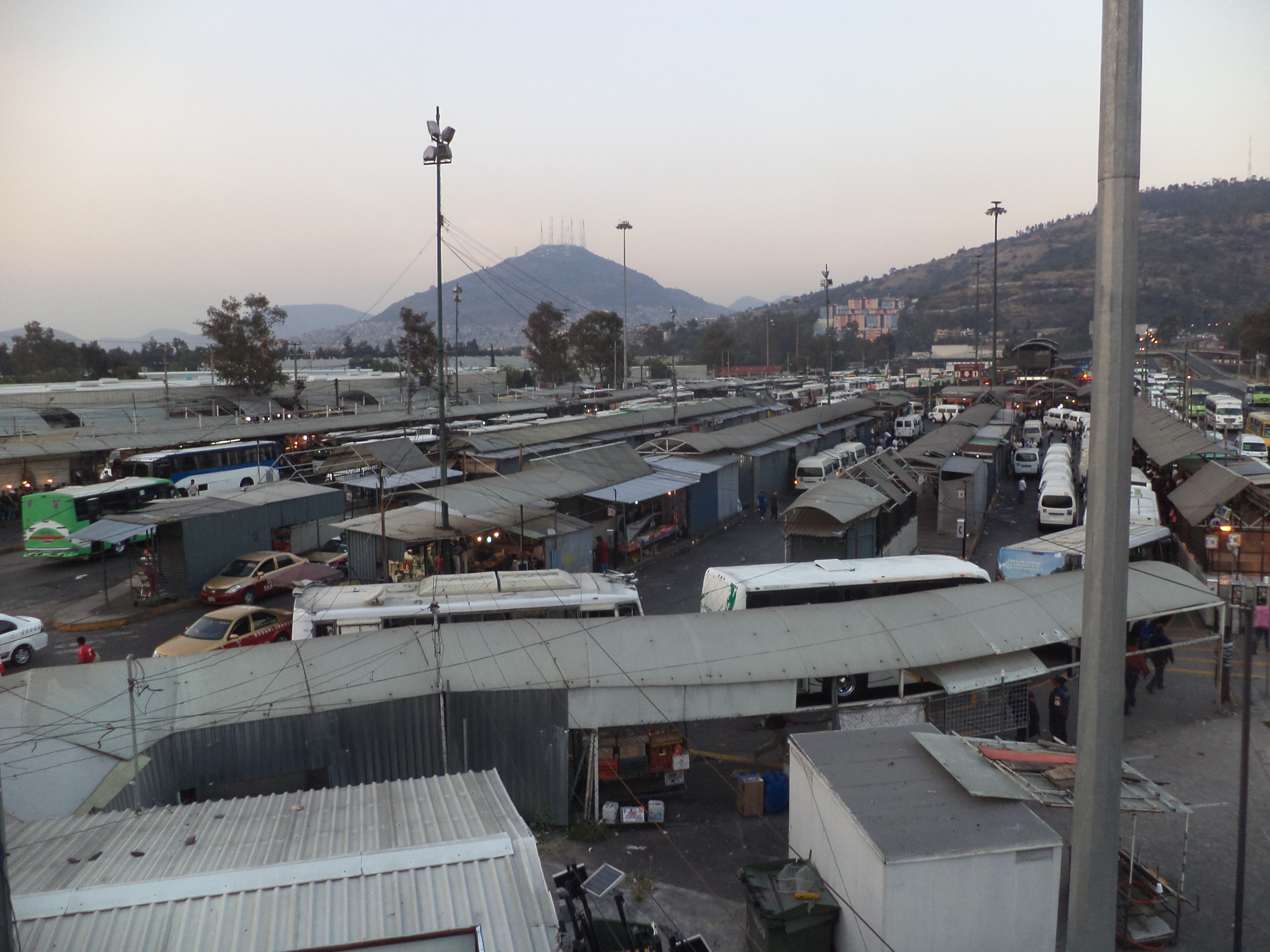
CETRAM Indios Verdes

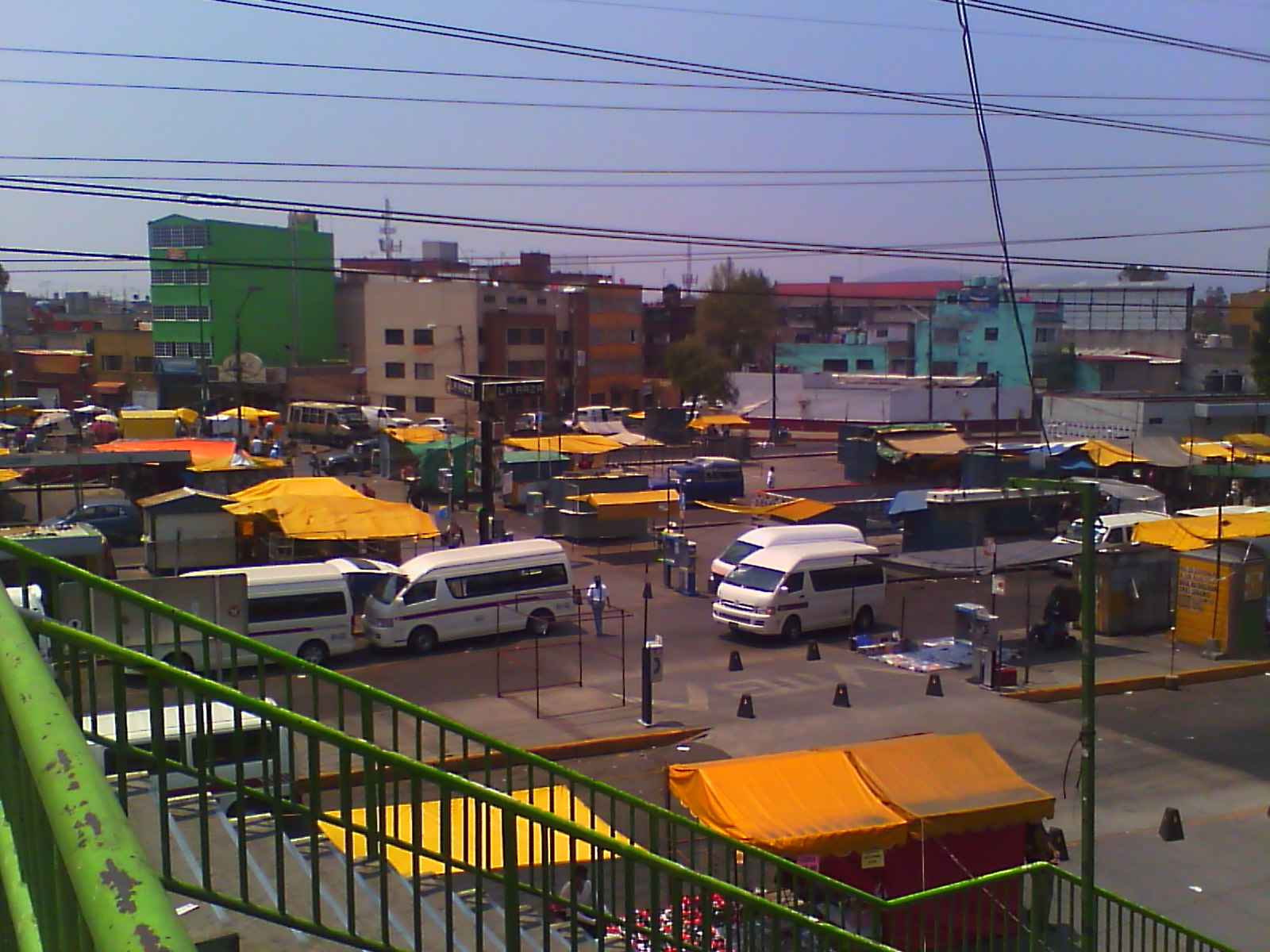
CETRAM La Raza

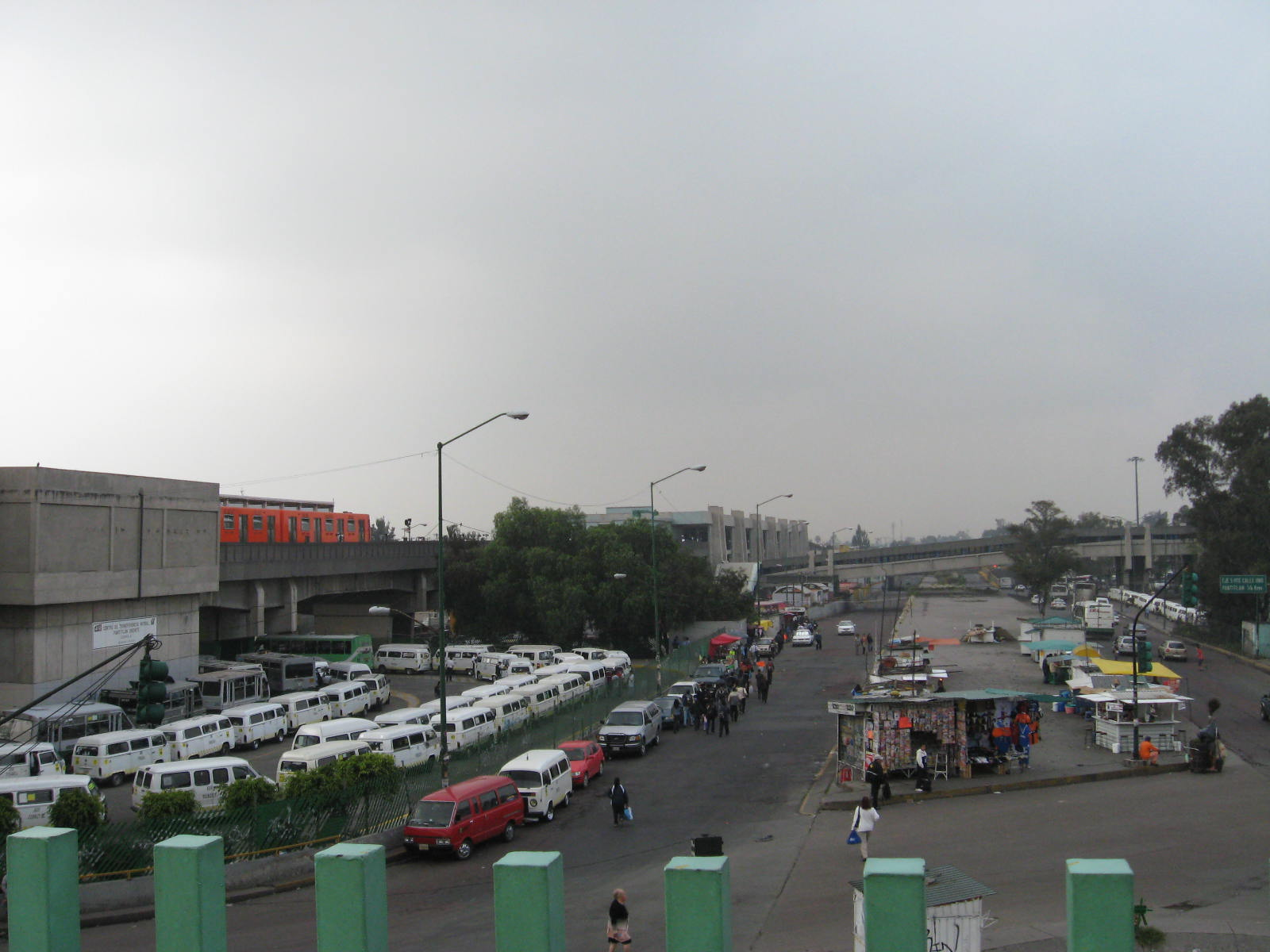
CETRAM Pantitlán

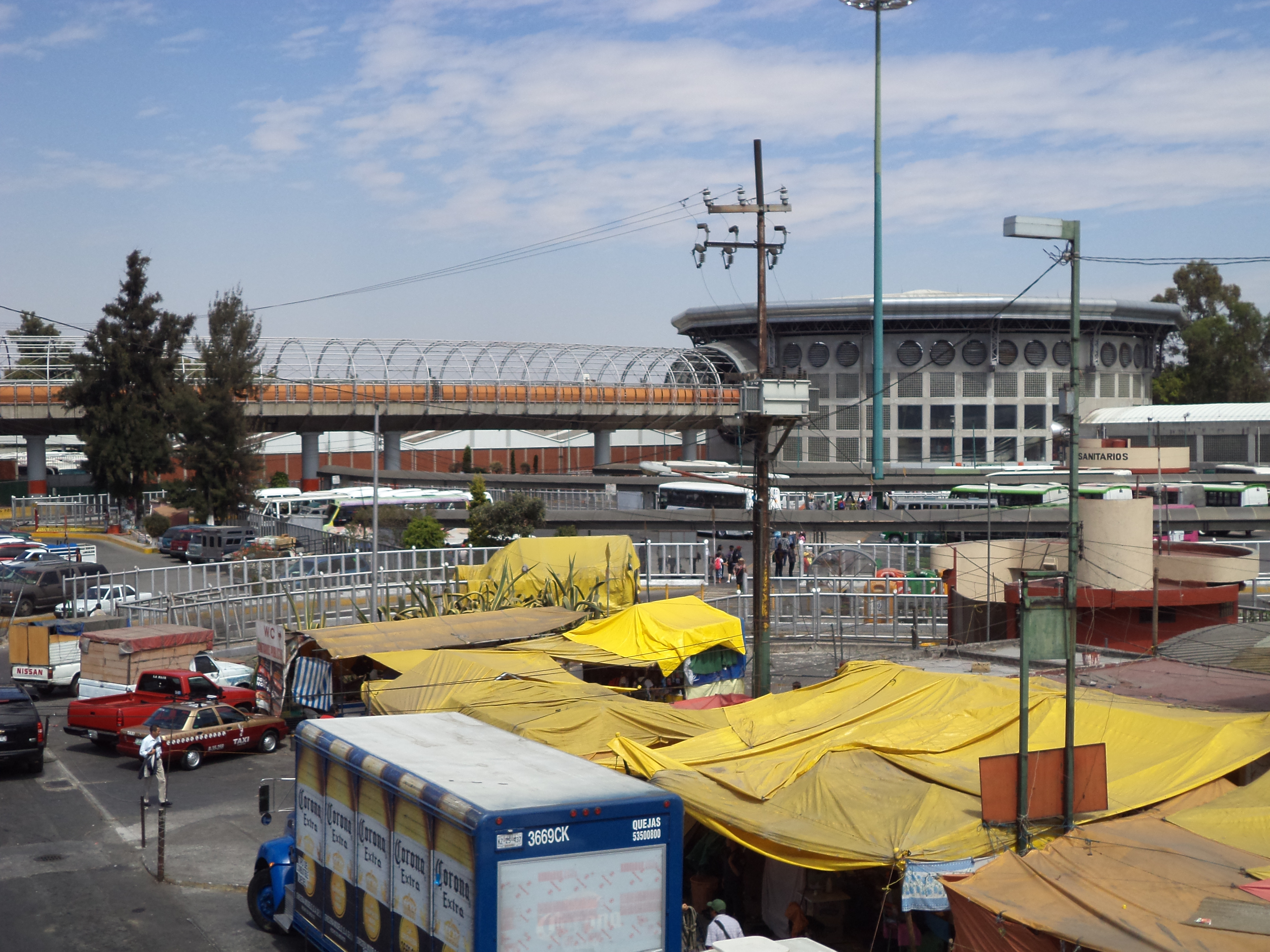
CETRAM San Lázaro

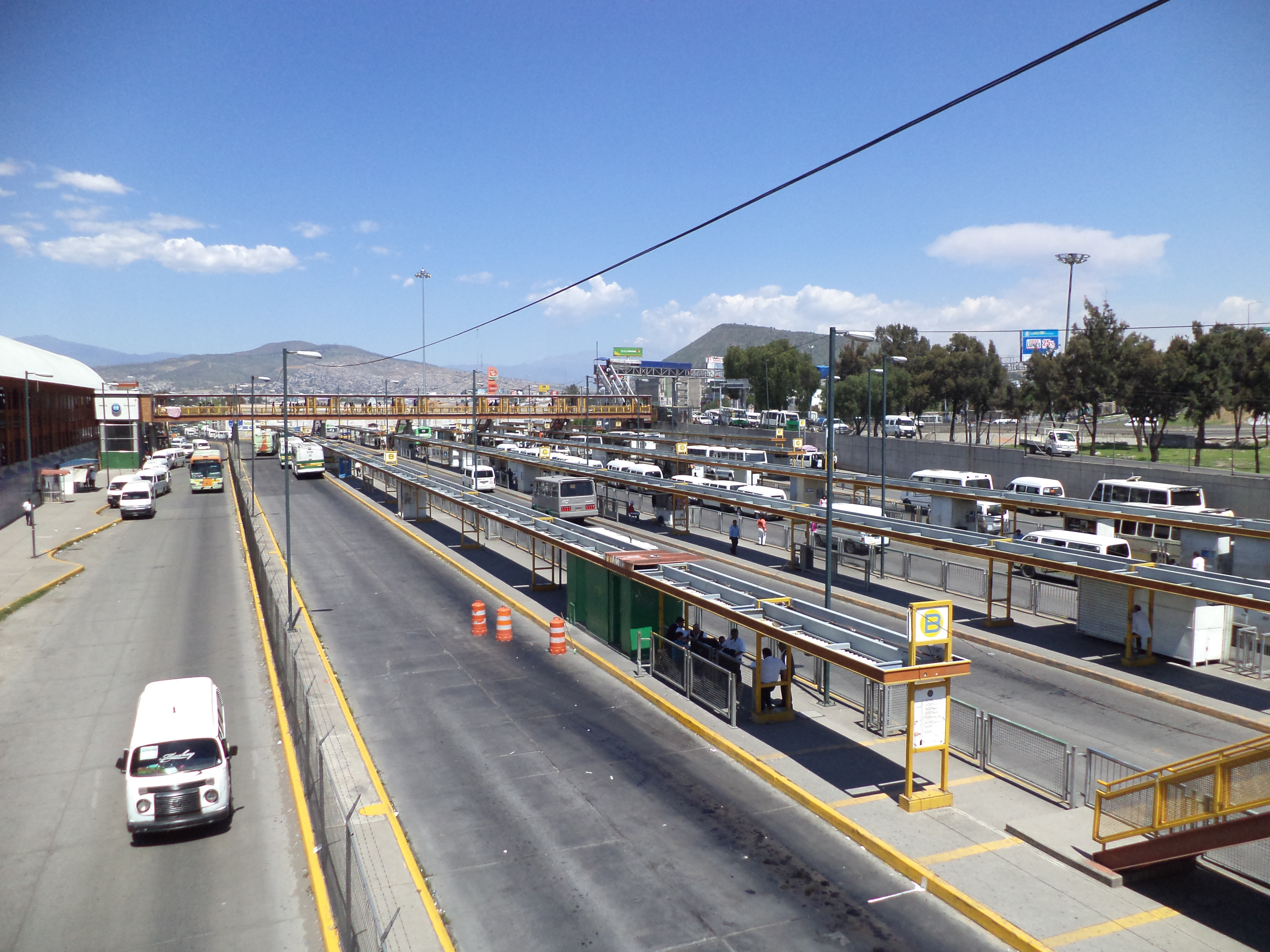
CETRAM Santa Marta

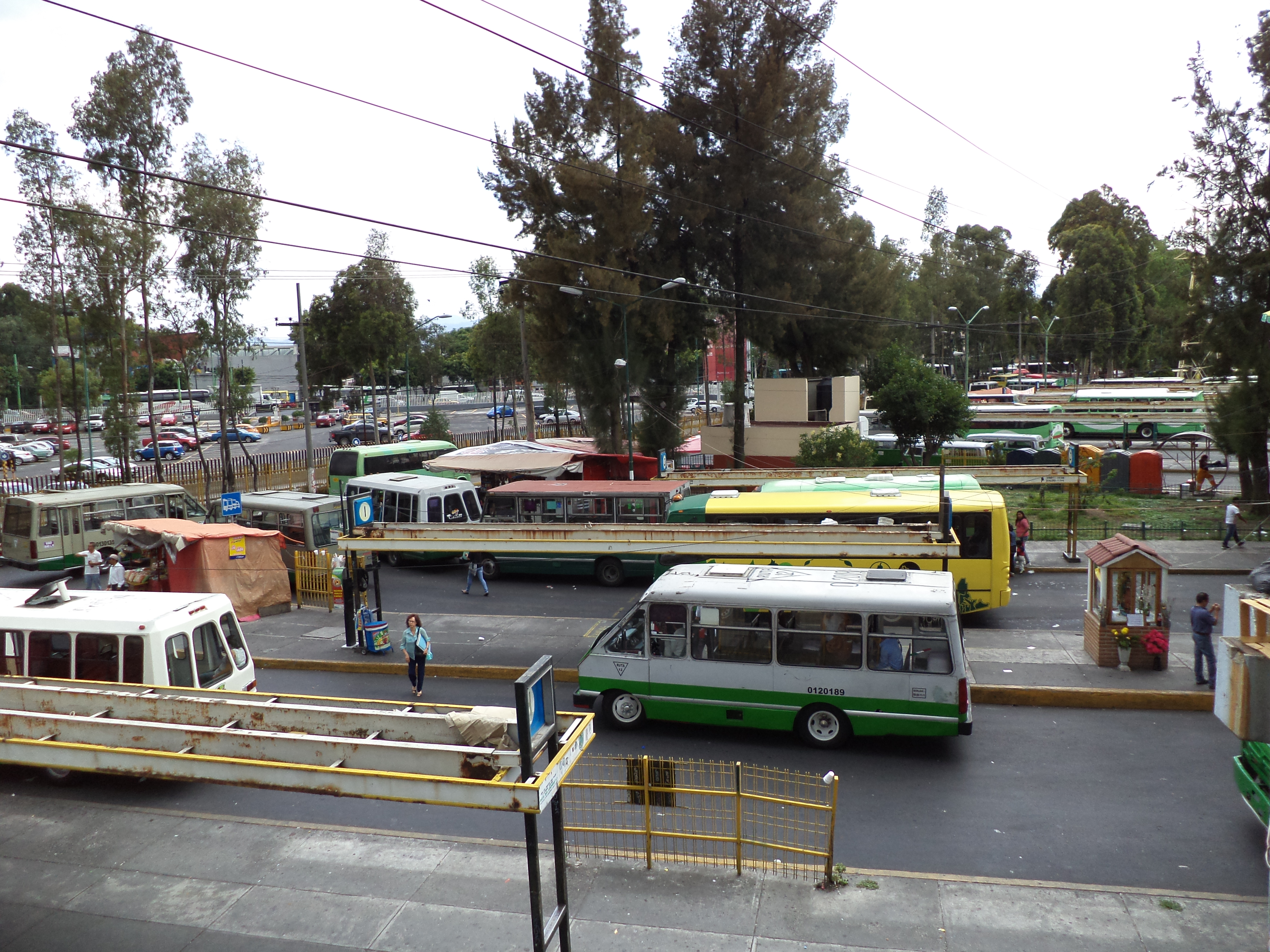
CETRAM Tasqueña

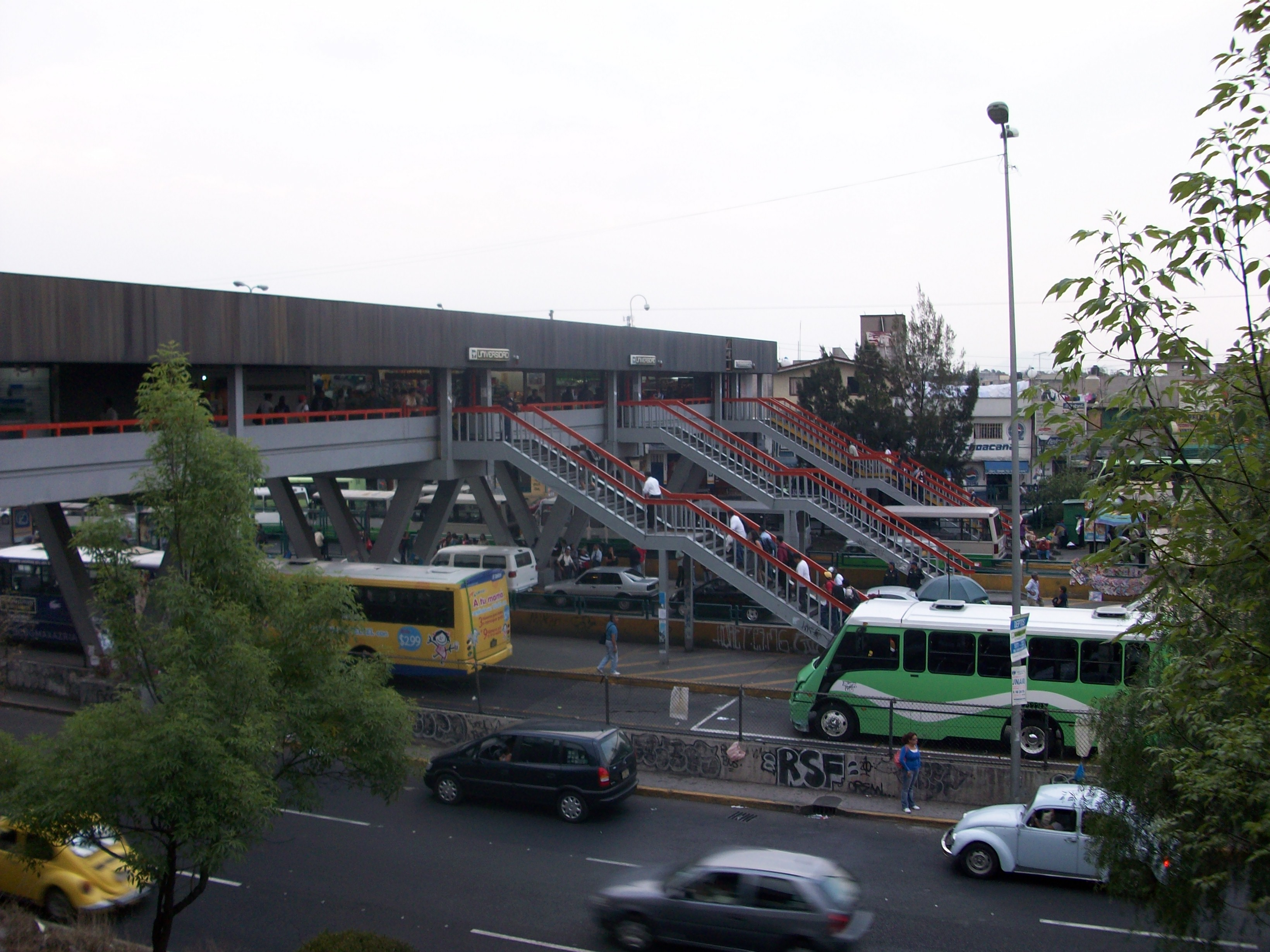
CETRAM Universidad

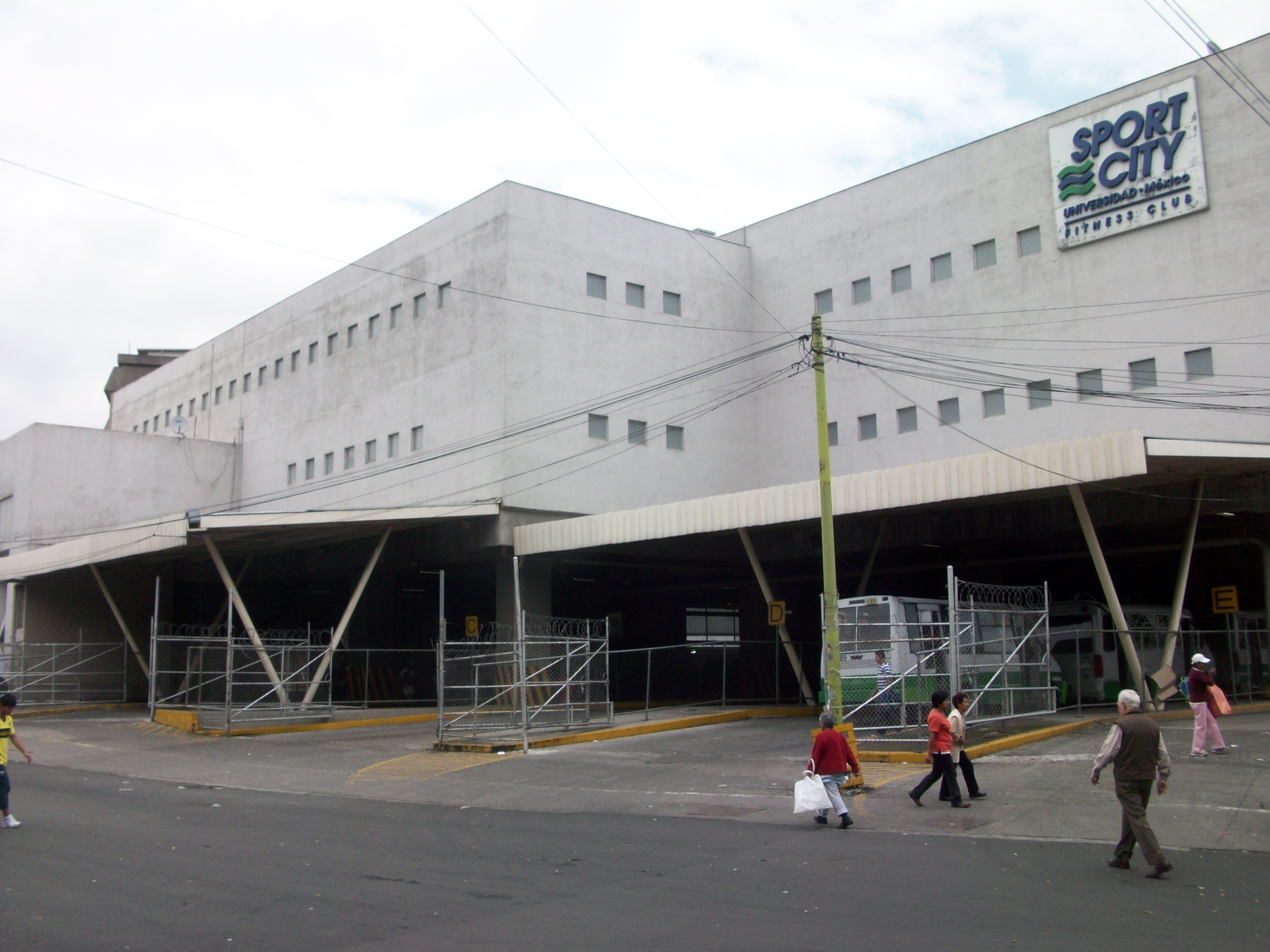
CETRAM Zapata

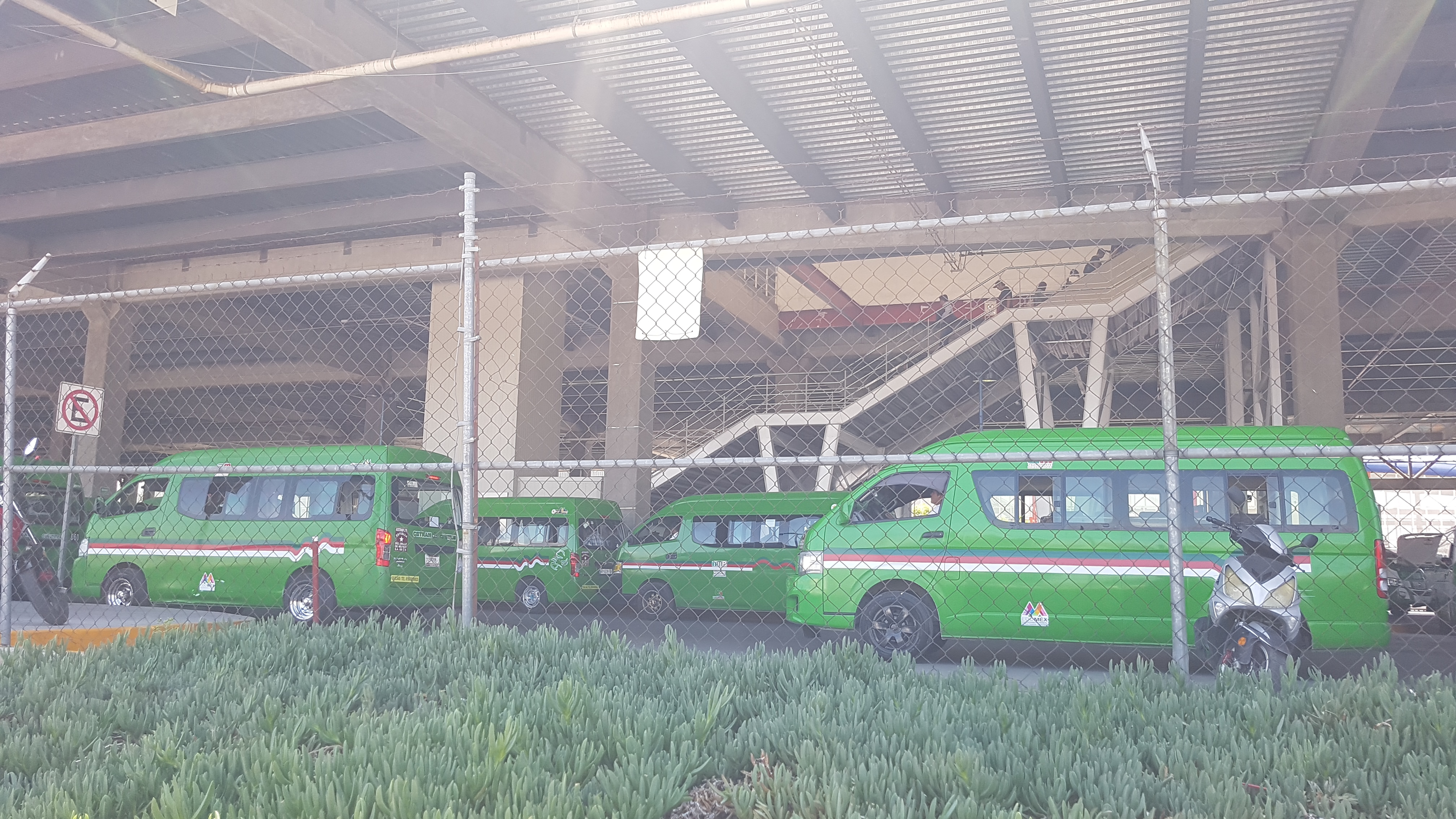
ETRAM Cuautitlán

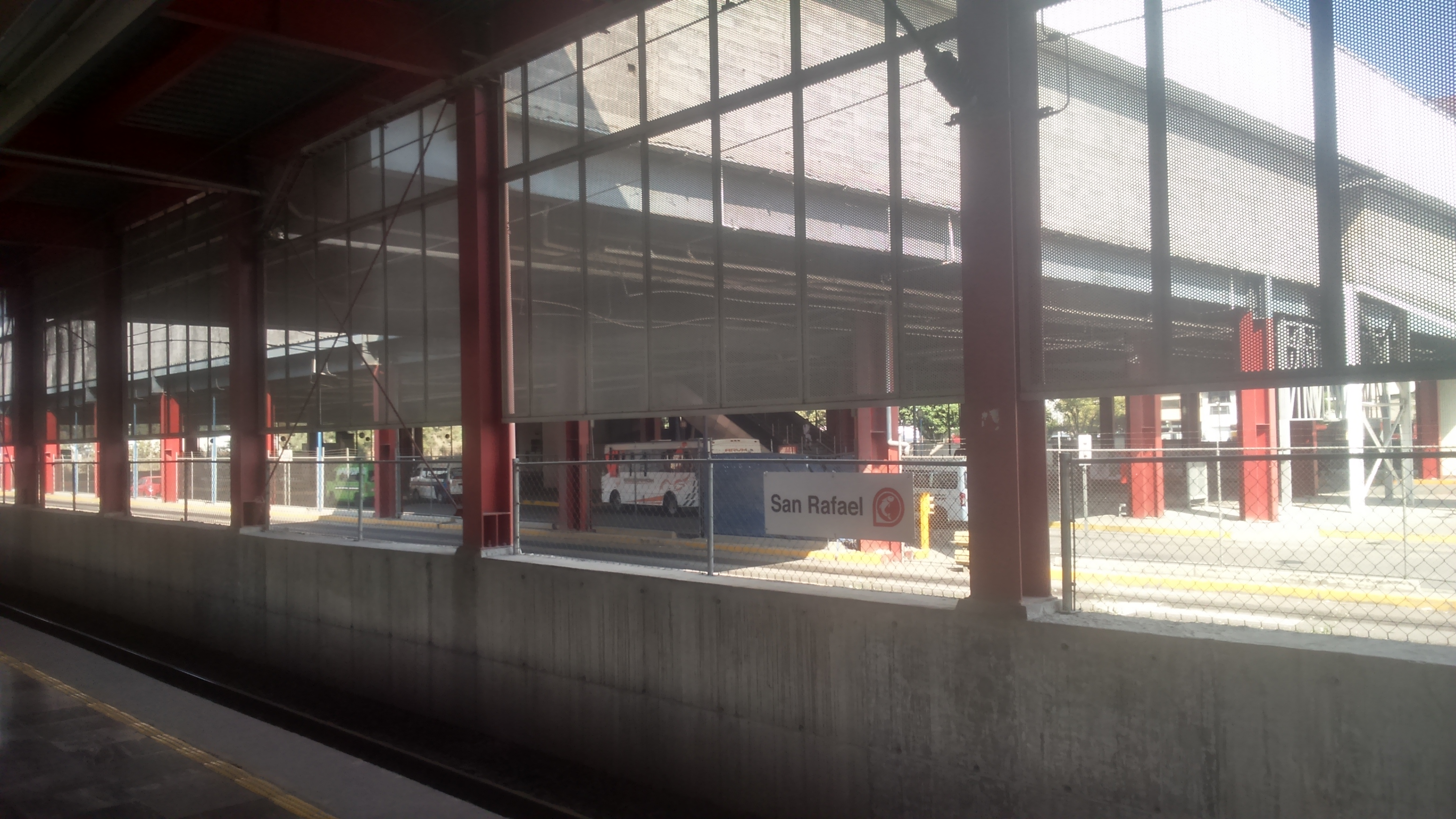
ETRAM San Rafael
