= Mexipuerto Cementos Fortaleza Cuatro Caminos =

Shopping mall and transport terminal in Naucalpan, Mexico

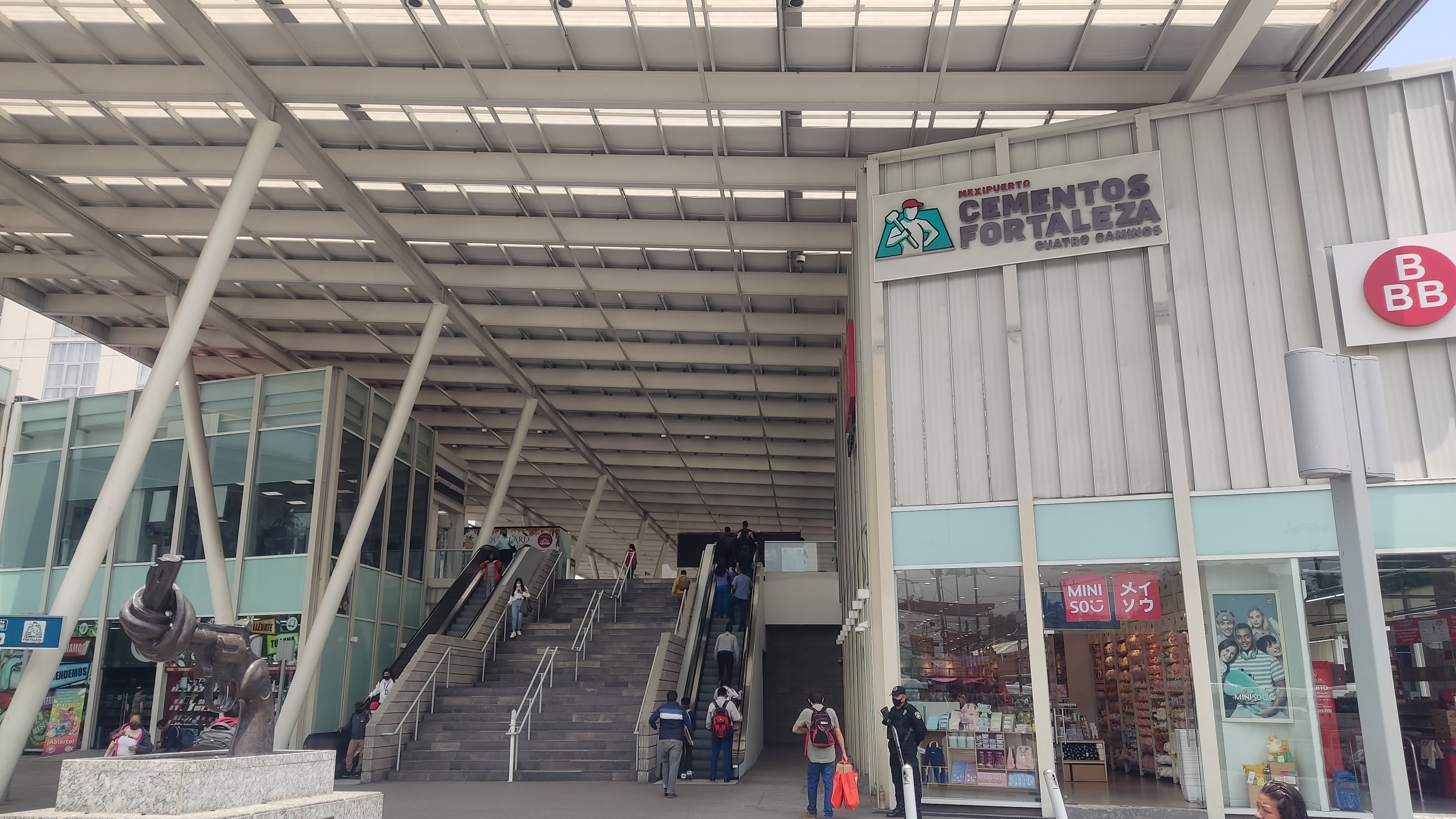
- The shopping center and transit terminal in 2022
- Location: Naucalpan, State of Mexico, Mexico
- Coordinates: 19°27′26″N 99°12′57″W
- Address: Av. Transmisiones Militares No. 30, Fraccionamiento Parque Industrial Naucalpan, Naucalpan de Juárez, C.P. 53489, Estado de México
- Opened: November 2016
- Developer: Inmuebles Carso (Grupo Carso)
- Manager: Concesionaria ETRAM Cuatro Caminos
- Num. of anchor tenants: 3
- Floor area: 31,549 m^{2} (339,590 sq ft)
- Parking: 1,912
- Website: mexipuertocementosfortalezacuatrocaminos.com

Modal transfer station (ETRAM)
- Opened: 19 November 2016 (south wing)
- Concession: Grupo Carso (30 years)
- Operator: Concesionaria ETRAM Cuatro Caminos
- Connections: Cuatro Caminos (Line 2); Routes: 18, 57-A, 57-C; Route: 16-B; Line 3: Mexipuerto Toreo (under construction); Various local and intercity service routes

Mexipuerto Cementos Fortaleza Cuatro Caminos (often shortened to Mexipuerto Cuatro Caminos) is a shopping mall and public transportation terminal in Naucalpan, State of Mexico, part of Greater Mexico City. It is adjacent to Cuatro Caminos metro station, the terminus of Line 2. "Mexipuerto" refers to the public transportation station (known as CETRAMs in Mexico), "Cementos Fortaleza" is the company that holds the naming rights, and "Cuatro Caminos" refers to the metro station and the surrounding area. Passengers can transfer between the metro and the peseros (minibuses) and regional buses that use the terminal. The complex includes a 31,549-square-metre (339,590 sq ft) shopping center anchored by Sears, Sanborns and Cinemex, and a 15-story residential tower.

== History ==
The complex was built on the site of the south bus and minibus terminal (paradero sur) of the Cuatro Caminos metro station, which had long been known for disorder, garbage, street vending and crime. Construction began on 2 June 2014. The project was carried out by Concesionaria ETRAM Cuatro Caminos, a subsidiary of Grupo Carso, and developed by its real estate arm, Inmuebles Carso. The state government described it as the largest modal transfer station in Latin America, covering 93,470 square metres (23.10 acres) with an initial investment of 1.141 billion pesos (about US$61 million at the 2016 average exchange rate), and expected it to handle an average of 300,000 passengers and 9,000 vehicles a day. In May 2016 the municipality of Naucalpan placed closure seals on parts of the works after an excavator broke a gas pipe and caused a leak.

The south wing opened in November 2016. Public transport began using its platforms on 19 November, with 32 routes serving the north of the Valley of Mexico. According to Quadratín, the investment had reached 1.2 billion pesos (about US$64 million), and the complex was guarded by private security and state police and monitored by more than 200 cameras. The terminal uses electronic identification and timers to control how long each bus stays at the platforms. The complex has four levels of parking with 1,912 spaces, and a free digital library; the developer also listed 165 rental apartments under development.

About a month after the opening, workers covered the words "Cementos Fortaleza" on the terminal's signs with plastic, leaving only "Mexipuerto Cuatro Caminos". Residents and users had objected to the site being named after a cement company.

== North terminal ==
The original plans called for the north terminal (paradero norte) to be rebuilt as well, but it remained unrenovated. By June 2017 about 600,000 people a day passed through the Cuatro Caminos metro station. The new terminal received some 20,000 public transport vehicles and 400,000 passengers daily and was watched by 300 cameras, while the north terminal was still marked by traffic chaos, street vending and crime. That month the head of Mexico City proper's Miguel Hidalgo borough, Xóchitl Gálvez, and the mayor of Naucalpan signed an agreement at the Mexipuerto to coordinate on the area's problems. In December 2021 the State of Mexico legislature urged the state transport secretary to ensure the north terminal's rehabilitation was completed. The legislator who proposed the measure noted that Grupo Carso held a 30-year concession for the site and had committed to begin work on the north side by the end of 2019.

== Mexicable Line 3 ==
Space for an aerial cable car to the upper districts of Naucalpan was set aside in the Mexipuerto's plans from the start. Line 3 of the Mexicable, under construction as of 2026, will start at a station called Mexipuerto Toreo on platforms J and K of the terminal. The line will run about 9.5 kilometres (5.9 mi) with ten stations to Izcalli Chamapa and Lomas del Cadete. As of October 2026 its opening was expected in mid-2027.
