= Mexicable =

Mexican public transport system project

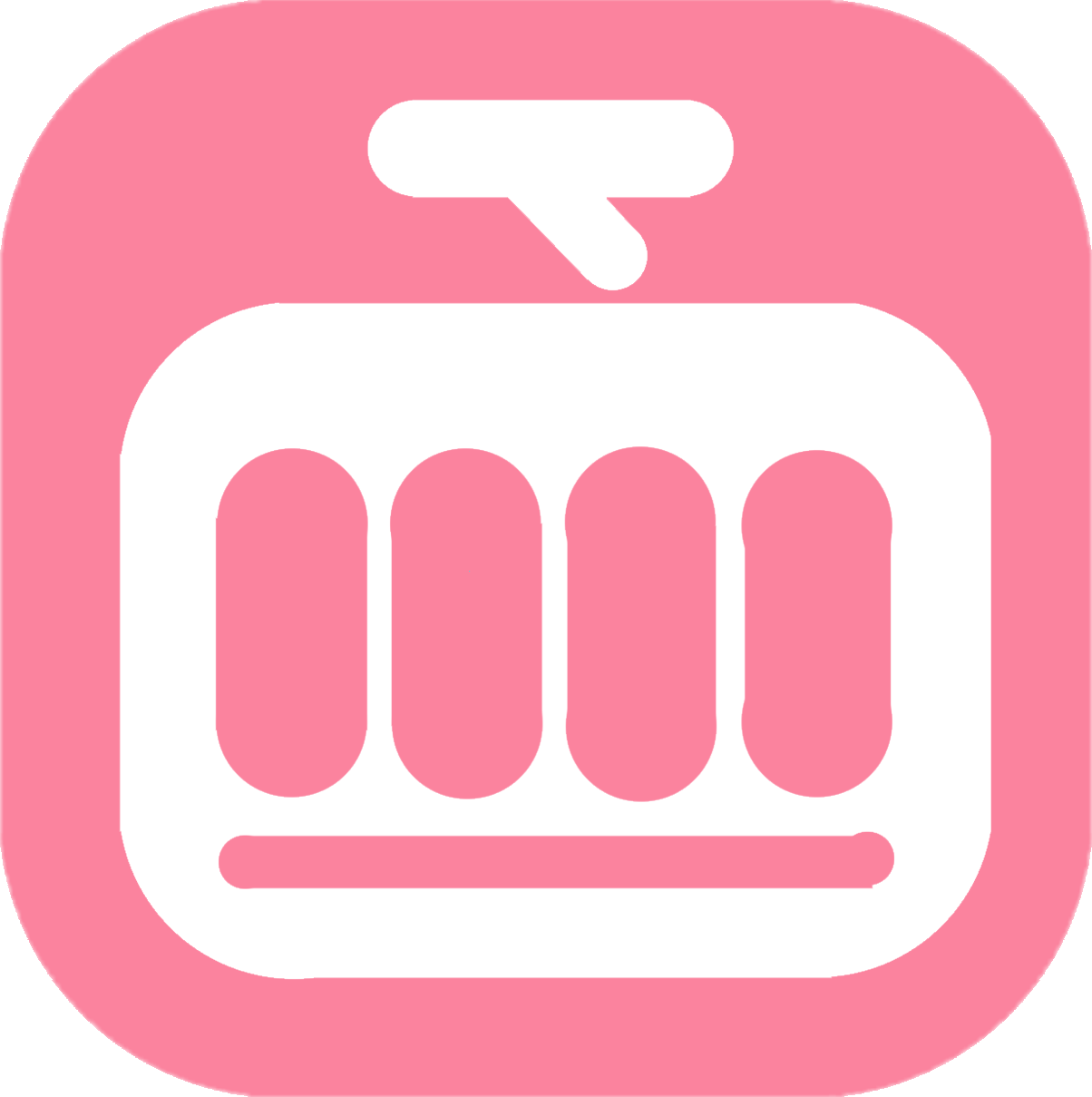

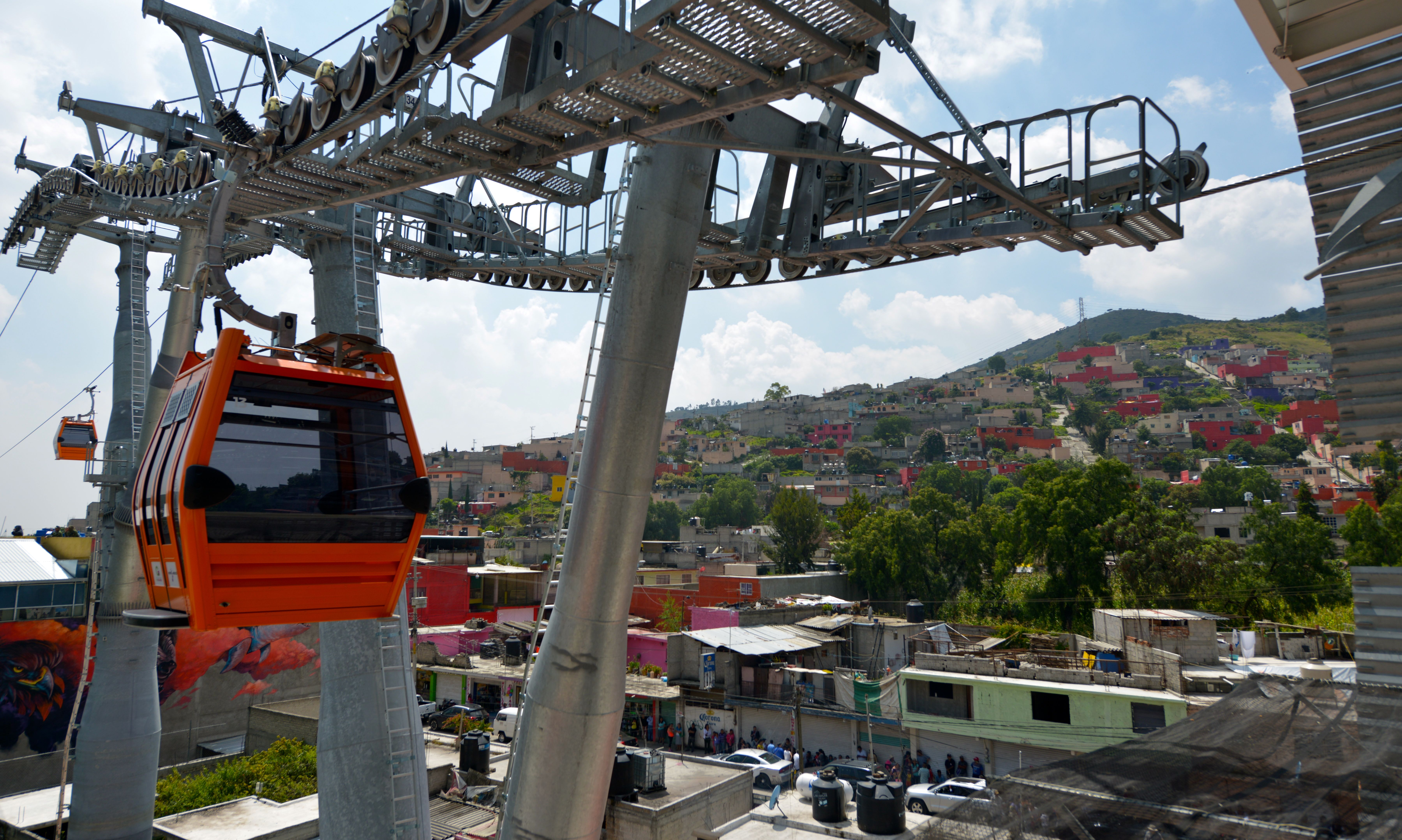

Overview
- Locale: State of Mexico and Mexico City, Mexico
- Transit type: Cable car
- Number of lines: 2
- Number of stations: 14
- Daily ridership: 29,000 per day (estimated, 2016)
- Website: mexicable.com

Operation
- Began operation: 4 October 2016
- Operators: ALFA, S.A.B. de C.V. y Grupo IUSA, S.A. de C.V.
- Number of vehicles: 184 (Line 1); 200 (Line 2)

Technical
- System length: 13.15 km (8.2 mi)
System map

Mexicable is an aerial lift line in Ecatepec de Morelos and Tlalnepantla de Baz, in Greater Mexico City, and one station in Mexico City proper. It was created by the Government of the State of Mexico.

The first part of this project was inaugurated on October 4, 2016. The line is 4.8 kilometres (3.0 mi) long and runs between San Andrés de la Cañada (in the Sierra de Guadalupe) and Vía Morelos (in Ecatepec), through five intermediate stations. It reduces traveling times between those points to 17 minutes, down from the hour-long commutes between the same points using ground transportation.

The Mexicable operates 184 cars, each with a capacity 10 passengers. The predicted capacity is 3,000 passengers per hour for each line and 29,000 passengers per day, with a fare of 9 pesos as of July 2020.

The New York Times reported in 2016 that the Mexicable has brought some urban renewal to the areas served by stations. Streetlights were installed, roads were paved, and about 50 murals were commissioned along the route.

== Service ==
Key (Note: The following list was adapted from different websites and official maps.: Metro connections obtained from the official Mexico City Metro system map.; Accessibility obtained from the Mexico City Metro system map. In some cases, the map omits the accessibility icon as the station(s) are actually partially accessible. However, the respective websites of each station on the official site indicate the respective accessibility methods. Stations with the symbol are fully accessible; stations with the symbol are partially accessible.; Cablebús obtained from their official website.; Centro de transferencia modal (CETRAM;) obtained from the official website of the Órgano Regulador de Transporte.; Ecobici obtained from their official website.; Metrobús obtained from the Mexico City Metrobús system map.; Mexibús obtained from the official Mexico City Metro system map.; Mexicable obtained from the official Mexico City Metro system map.; Public buses network (peseros) obtained from the official website of the Órgano Regulador de Transporte.; Red de Transporte de Pasajeros obtained from their official website.; Trolleybuses obtained from their official website.)
| Handicapped/disabled access | Fully accessible station | Cablebús Line {{{3}}} | Cablebús connection | Red de Transporte de Pasajeros | RTP connection |
| Handicapped/disabled access | Partially accessible station | Mexibús | Mexibús connection | Tren Interurbano | Tren Interurbano connection |
| Transfer hub | CETRAM transfer station | Mexicable | Mexicable connection | Tren Suburbano | Tren Suburbano connection |
| Transfer hub | ETRAM transfer station | Mexico City Metro | Mexico City Metro connection | Trolleybus | Trolleybus connection |
| Ecobici | Ecobici bikeshare | Mexico City minubus | Pesero connection | Mexico City Light Rail | Mexico City Light Rail connection |

=== Existing lines ===
==== Line 1 ====
| Stations (Note: All the stations are fully accessible to people with disabilities.) | | Connections | Location | Picture | Date opened |
|---|---|---|---|---|---|
| 1 | Santa Clara | Mexibús Mexibús Line 4 State of Mexico minubus | Ecatepec de Morelos | | 4 October 2016 |
| 2 | Hank González | Mexicable Mexicable Line 2 State of Mexico minubus | Ecatepec de Morelos | | 4 October 2016 |
| 3 | Fátima | State of Mexico minubus | Ecatepec de Morelos | | 4 October 2016 |
| 4 | Tablas del Pozo | State of Mexico minubus | Ecatepec de Morelos | | 4 October 2016 |
| 5 | Los Bordos | State of Mexico minubus | Ecatepec de Morelos | | 4 October 2016 |
| 6 | Deportivo | State of Mexico minubus | Ecatepec de Morelos | | 4 October 2016 |
| 7 | La Cañada | State of Mexico minubus | Ecatepec de Morelos | | 4 October 2016 |

==== Line 2 ====
| Stations | | Connections | Location | Picture | Date opened |
|---|---|---|---|---|---|
| 1 | Indios Verdes | 101, 101A, 101B, 101D, 102, 107B (at distance), 108; Various intercity routes | Gustavo A. Madero, Mexico City | | 30 March 2023 |
| 2 | Tanque de Agua | | Tlalnepantla de Baz | | 30 March 2023 |
| 3 | Periférico | Various intercity routes | Tlalnepantla de Baz | | 30 March 2023 |
| 4 | San Isidro | | Tlalnepantla de Baz | | 30 March 2023 |
| 5 | Dr. Jorge Jiménez Cantú | | Tlalnepantla de Baz | | 30 March 2023 |
| 6 | La Mesa | | Ecatepec de Morelos | | 30 March 2023 |
| 7 | Hank González | Various intercity routes | Ecatepec de Morelos | | 30 March 2023 |

===== Colonia Tepeolulco expansion project =====
In March 2025, the government of Tlalnepantla presented a project to expand the system from La Mesa station to Colonia Tepeolulco.

=== Future lines ===
Line 3 is under construction in Naucalpan. At La Tolva station, the line will divide into two cables for transfer, one toward Izcalli Chamapa and the other one toward Lomas del Cadete. As of January 2026, about 65 % of the civil work for this line, which will have 278 cabins for a daily capacity of 40,000 passengers, has been done and opening is planned for the first quarter in 2027.

==== Line 3 ====
| Stations (Note: Proposed names. All the stations are fully accessible to people with disabilities.) | | Connections | Location | Picture | Date opened |
|---|---|---|---|---|---|
| 1 | Cuatro Caminos | (at Cuatro Caminos); 18, 57A, 57C; 16B; Various intercity bus routes | Naucalpan | | Under construction, planned opening first quarter 2027 |
| 2 | Lázaro Cárdenas | | Naucalpan | | Under construction, planned opening first quarter 2027 |
| 3 | El Molinito | Edomex Light Rail (proposed) | Naucalpan | | Under construction, planned opening first quarter 2027 |
| 4 | San Antonio Zomeyucan | | Naucalpan | | Under construction, planned opening first quarter 2027 |
| 5 | Centenario | | Naucalpan | | Under construction, planned opening first quarter 2027 |
| 6 | La Tolva | | Naucalpan | | Under construction, planned opening first quarter 2027 |
| 7 | Parque La Hormiga | | Naucalpan | | Under construction, planned opening first quarter 2027 |
| 8 | Izcalli Chamapa | | Naucalpan | | Under construction, planned opening first quarter 2027 |
| 9 | Benito Juárez | | Naucalpan | | Under construction, planned opening first quarter 2027 |
| 10 | Lomas del Cadete | | Naucalpan | | Under construction, planned opening first quarter 2027 |

==== Line 4 ====
A fourth line is planned to run from Tlalnepantla railway station toward the municipality of Nicolás Romero.

== See also ==
- Cablebús, a similar system operating in the neighboring Mexico City
