= Cuatro Caminos metro station (Naucalpan) =

Mexico City metro station

Cuatro Caminos
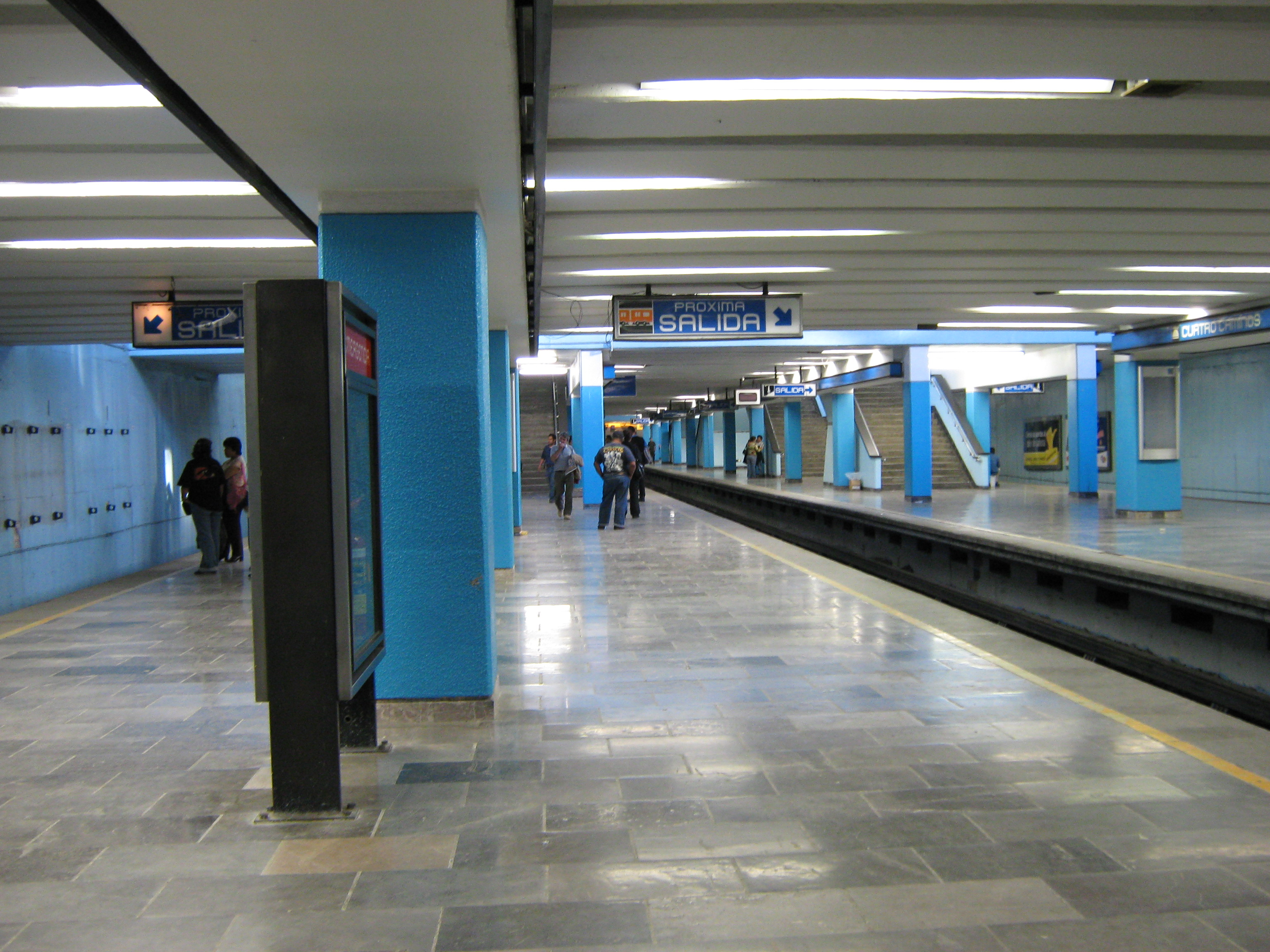
- View of the platforms

General information
- Other names: Toreo
- Location: Naucalpan, State of Mexico; Mexico
- Coordinates: 19°27′35″N 99°12′57″W
- System: Mexico City Metro
- Operator: Sistema de Transporte Colectivo (STC)
- Platforms: 2 island platforms
- Tracks: 3
- Connections: Cuatro Caminos; Routes: 18, 57-A, 57-C; Route: 16-B; Cuatro Caminos (under planning); Various local and intercity service routes

Construction
- Structure type: Underground
- Accessible: Yes

Other information
- Status: In service

History
- Opened: 22 August 1984; 42 years ago

Passengers
- 2025: 34,816,623 (Note: The data here is limited to the most recent ten years to avoid excessive listings; earlier figures can be found in this page's history or on the Mexico City Metro website. To calculate the average daily ridership, the annual total is divided by 365 days (366 in leap years), with decimals omitted from the result. Each station per line is ranked individually, as the system counts transfer stations separately. The percentage change is calculated automatically using the data from the current year and the previous year.) ▲7.79%
- Rank: 1/195

Services
Preceding station	Mexico City Metro	Following station
Terminus	Line 2	Panteones toward Tasqueña
Route map
Location
- Location within Mexico City
- Area map and station layout

Cuatro Caminos (translated from Spanish the name literally means "Four Roads") is a station of the Mexico City metro network. Colloquially known as "Metro Toreo", it is the north terminus of Line 2. The adjacent Mexipuerto Cementos Fortaleza Cuatro Caminos mixed-use development opened in 2016 and houses, besides a shopping center, residential tower and sports facility, a bus terminal that is a hub for regional bus and minibus transport from and into the State of Mexico. In 2019, the station had an average ridership of 114,947 passengers per day, making it the third busiest station in the network.

As of 14 September 1970 Line 2 originally terminated at Metro Tacuba, but on 22 August 1984 the line was extended an additional two stations to reach the municipality of Naucalpan. The station sits on the dividing line between the Mexico City and the neighboring State of Mexico and as such was the first station of the network to be built outside the limits of the Federal District.

== General information ==
The station logo is a large geodesic dome depicting the former nearby Toreo de Cuatro Caminos bull fighting ring, which the station takes its name from, however the bullring was torn down in 2008. The station's surroundings (popularly known as the paradero), are the main public transport hub to Toluca and northwestern municipalities in the State of Mexico, such as Naucalpan, Atizapán, Tlalnepantla or Huixquilucan, as well as a major connection point to several destinations within the Mexico City proper and it also serves as the housing of a large street market, which is known largely because of its poor general conditions. Officially, no private vehicles are allowed in the area.

Upon leaving the station, there are two main corridors, labeled "North" and "South". North corridor (denoted by the exits A to K), is mainly used for transportation to State of Mexico, while the "South" corridor is mainly aimed at passengers going to the city (denoted by exit letters J to Z), though this is not strictly the case.

The South corridor (if walked) leads to the Mexipuerto bus terminal, the Toreo Parque Central and Pericentro shopping malls, the Anillo Periférico, and various military facilities, while the North corridor leads to the industrial complex of Naucalpan.

In 2003, the Mexican popular music group Café Tacuba produced an album with the title "Cuatro Caminos" in homage to this part of the city.

== Exits ==
- South: Avenida Ingenieros Militares, Colonia Argentina Poniente
- North: Avenida 16 de septiembre, Colonia Transmisiones

=== Ridership ===
Annual passenger ridership
Year	Ridership	Average daily	Rank	% change	Ref.
2025	34,816,623	95,388	1/195	+7.79%
2024	32,300,741	88,253	2/195	+55.93%
2023	20,714,261	56,751	3/195	+13.28%
2022	18,285,903	50,098	7/195	+20.65%
2021	15,156,149	41,523	6/195	−32.91%
2020	22,591,021	61,724	3/195	−42.63%
2019	39,378,128	107,885	2/195	−1.28%
2018	39,886,917	109,279	3/195	+1.33%
2017	39,364,914	107,849	3/195	+1.03%
2016	38,962,862	106,455	3/195	−3.61%

== Gallery ==
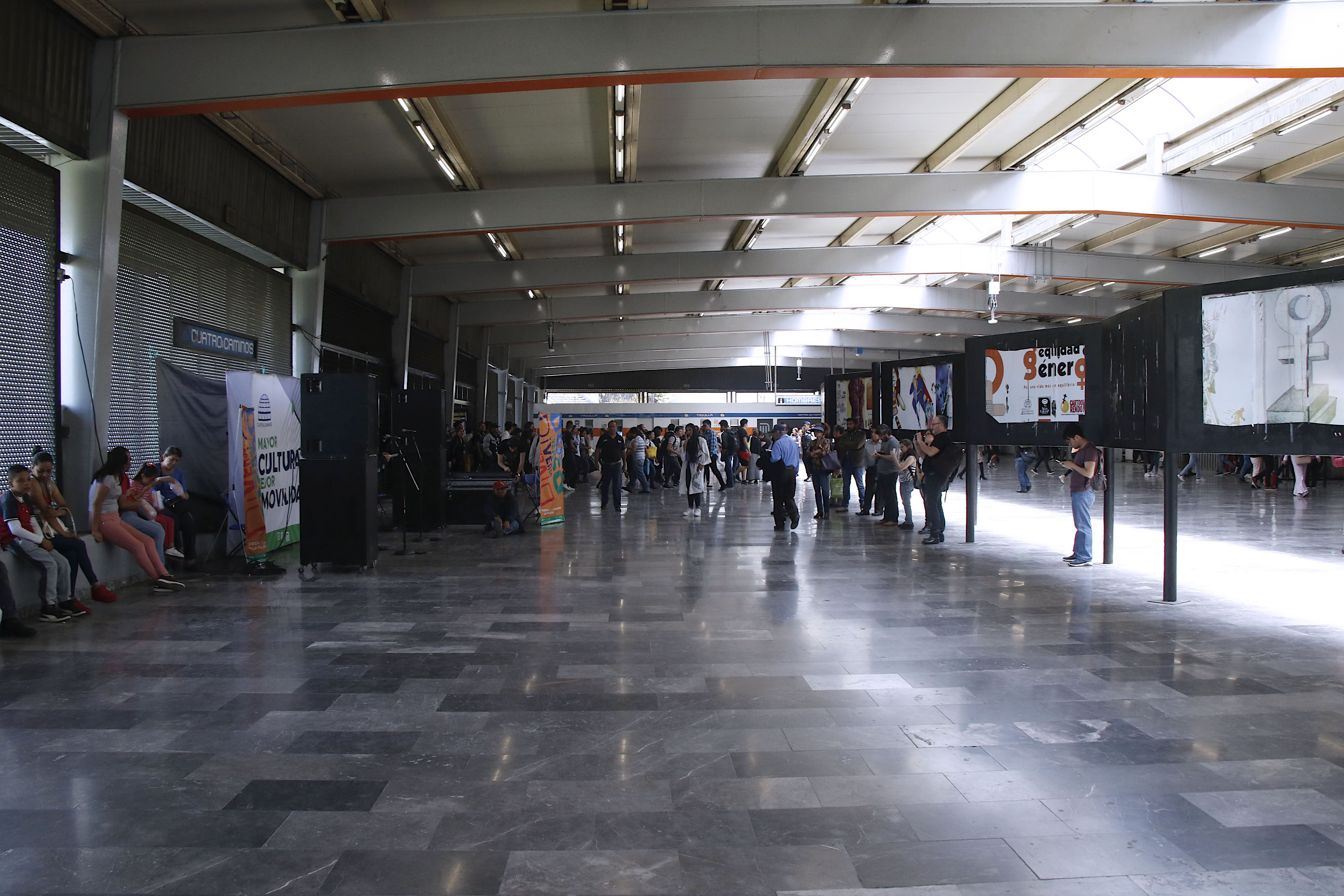
Station hallway

== See also ==
- List of Mexico City metro stations
