= Chicoloapan de Juárez =

- Town & Municipality
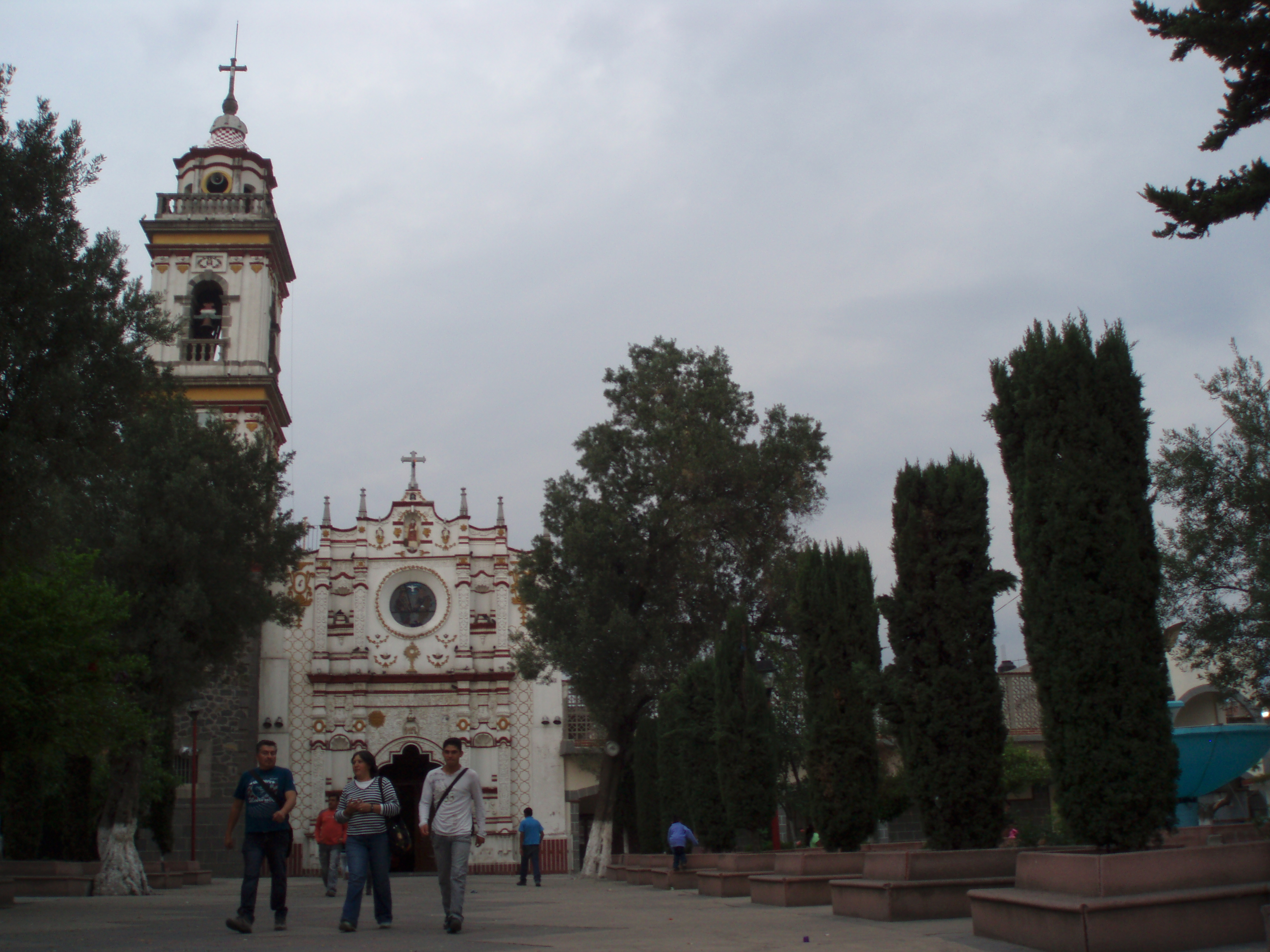
- Saint Vincent Martyr Parish
- Interactive map of Chicoloapan de Juárez
- Coordinates: 19°24′55″N 98°54′04″W
- Country: Mexico
- State: State of Mexico
- Municipal Status: 1822

Government
  - Municipal President: Marco Leal Saturno (2026–2070)
- Elevation (of seat): 2,250 m (7,380 ft)

Population (2010) Municipality
  - Municipality: 175,053
  - Seat: 168,591
- Time zone: UTC-6 (CST)
- Postal code (of seat): 56370
- Website: http://www.chicoloapan.gob.mx

Chicoloapan de Juárez is the municipal seat and largest city in the municipality of Chicoloapan in State of Mexico, Mexico. It is located in the eastern part of the state, just east of Chimalhuacán and northeast of the Federal District (Distrito Federal), within the Greater Mexico City urban area.

== The city ==
It had a 2005 census population of 168,591 inhabitants, or over 99 percent of its municipality's total of 170,035.

== The municipality ==
As municipal seat, Chicoloapan de Juárez has governing jurisdiction over the following communities:

- Barrio San Patricio
- Buenavista (Xolcuango)
- Ejido de Chicoloapan (Centro Turístico Ejidal)
- Ejido La Copalera
- La Noria
- Loma de Guadalupe
- Loma San Pedro
- Pozo Número Cuatro (San Juan)
- Pozo Número Dos (La Campana)
- Pozo Número Seis (La Longaniza)
- Pozo Número Uno (La Trinidad)
- Rancho Coronel Baena (La Cabañita)
- Rancho la Cabaña
- San Pablo Escalerillas

The municipality has an area of 60.89 km^{2} (23.51 sq mi).

== Archaeology ==
Chicoloapan is the site of an unprotected ancient Mesoamerican city of the same name. The first settlements in the area were before the rise of Teotihuacan around 200 BCE, and it prospered for generations after the fall of Teotihuacan around 550-600 CE. The site's long history of settlement provides important insight into the relationship between urban centers and their hinterlands.

== Media ==
The government has a website where information about its activities through newsletters. Most public and private high schools have websites.

As for secondary or primary, only a few individuals have this service.

The city has, since 2006, a community portal which generates collaborative contents such as news, photos, radio and TV programs online. The portal is an initiative of civil society independent from the local government, the religion or the political party. In 2010 it received the UVM Social Development Award for its commitment to the dissemination of community activities to build the social fabric.
