= Mexibús =

Bus rapid transit system in Mexico City

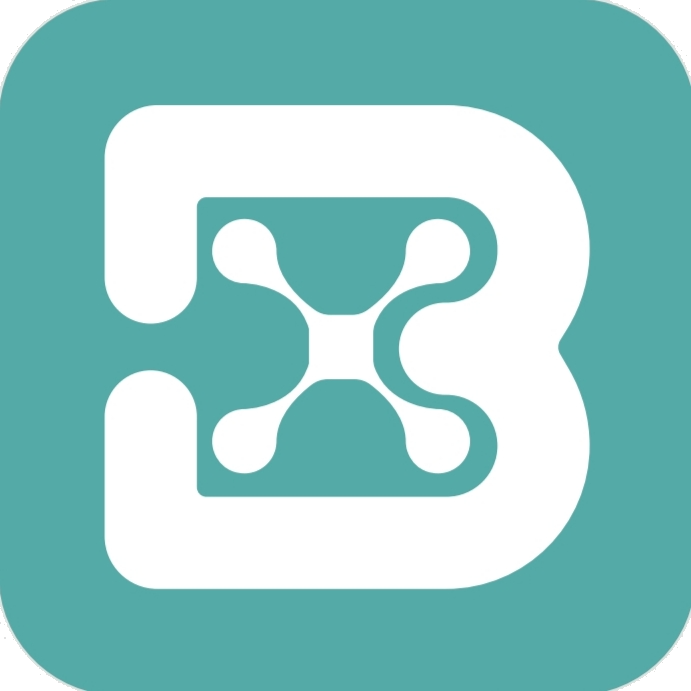

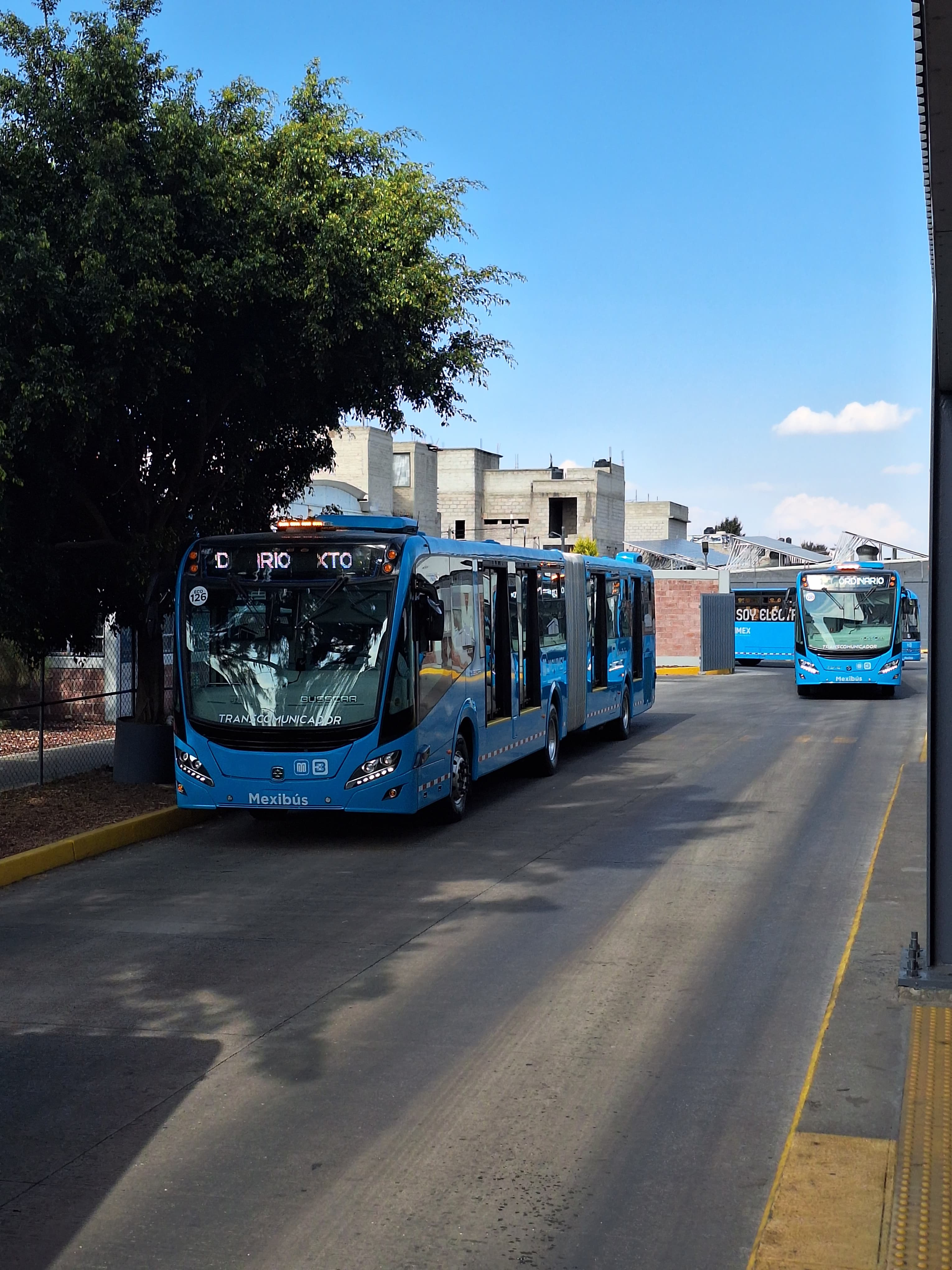
- Articulated buses operating for Mexibús BRT in Ecatepec.
- Founded: 2010
- Locale: State of Mexico and Mexico City
- Service type: bus rapid transit
- Routes: 7 (4 operative)
- Stations: 244 (161 operative)
- Operator: Transmasivo (Lines I, IV and V); Transcomunicador (Line II); Red de Transporte de Oriente (Line III)
- Website: sitramytem.edomex.gob.mx/mexibus

Mexibús is a bus rapid transit (BRT) system that is located in the Greater Mexico City part of the State of Mexico, which surrounds Mexico City proper.

It is operated by Transmasivo S.A. (Lines I and IV), Transcomunicador S.A. (Line II), and Red de Transporte de Oriente S.A. de C.V. (Line III). As of March 2024, there are four lines with a total length of 87 kilometres (54 mi) and 161 stations located in Ecatepec, Tecámac, Nezahualcóyotl, Chimalhuacán, Chicoloapan, Coacalco, Tultitlán, Cuautitlán Izcalli, Eastern Tlalnepantla, and Zumpango, all in the State of Mexico, and four stations in Mexico City proper in the Venustiano Carranza and Gustavo A. Madero boroughs.

== Network ==
=== Lines ===
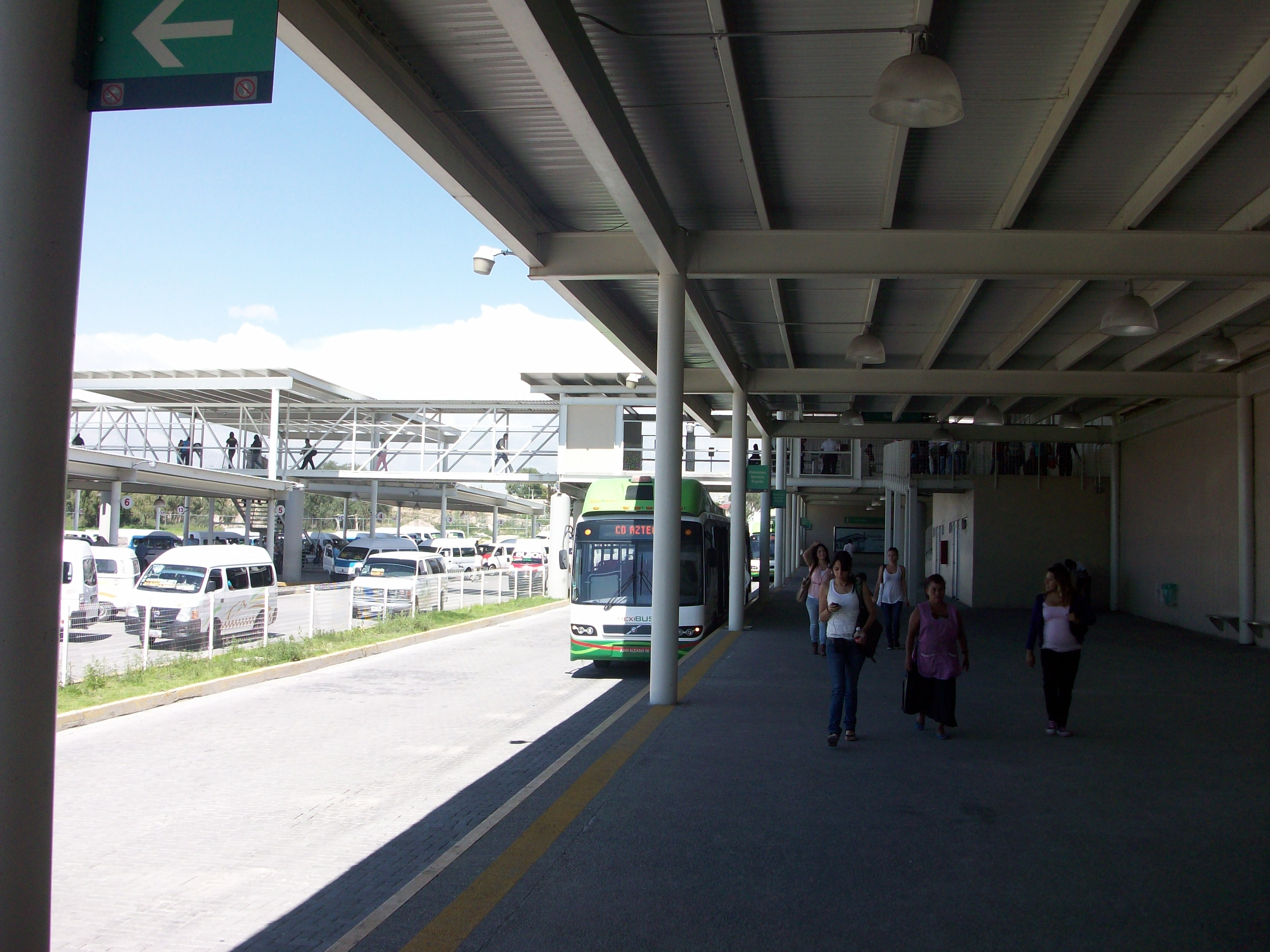
Terminal at Ojo de Agua

==== Line I: Ciudad Azteca – Ojo de Agua – Terminal de Pasajeros (AIFA) ====
Mexibús Line I serves the northeastern suburbs, operating from Ciudad Azteca (terminus of Line B of the Mexico City metro), to Ojo de Agua, the concession is in the hands of Transmasivo S.A. which operates both regular and express routes. It is 20 km long with 34 stations, and approximately 130,000 users per day. 75 articulated Volvo 7300 BRT buses ply the route painted white with red, light green and dark green trim. It began free operations in October 2010. On 21 March 2022, the line started servicing the Felipe Ángeles International Airport, in Zumpango.

==== Line II: Las Américas – La Quebrada / Río de los Remedios ====
Mexibús Line II runs 21.3 km long, from Fraccionamiento Las Américas in Ecatepec to La Quebrada, in Cuautitlán Izcalli, running along Avenida Primero de Mayo, Avenida Revolución and Avenida José López Portillo; it has 43 stations and 97 buses. Urbanbus is the concessionnaire.

This line connects two largest commercial centers of the far north metropolitan area: Galerías Perinorte and Plaza Las Américas. As of mid-2013 it was expected that the service would be operational in 2014. But it was until January 2015 when it was opened.

==== Line III: Pantitlán – Chimalhuacán / Acuitlapilco – Chicoloapan ====
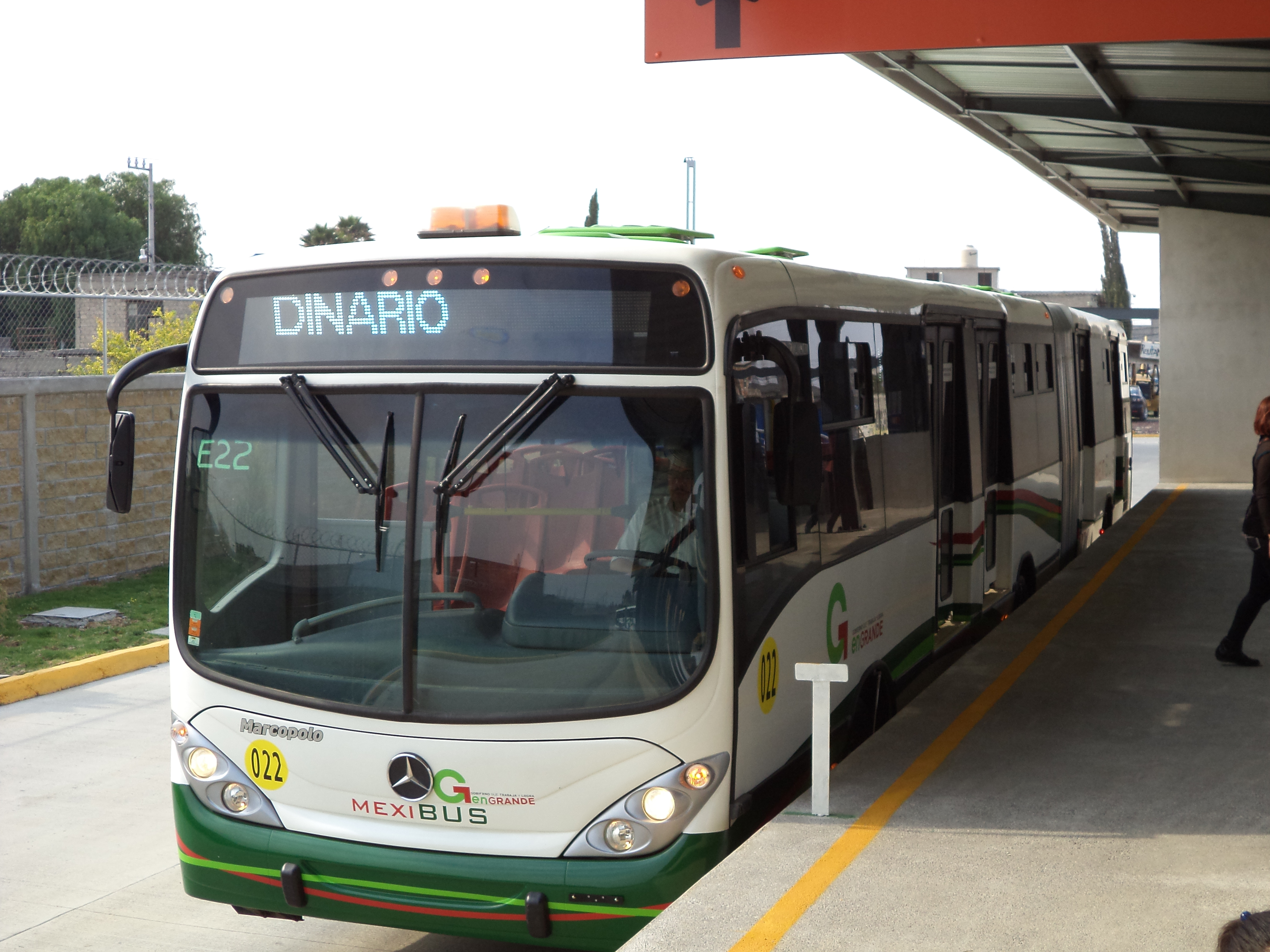
Mexibus Route 3 Chimalhuacán-Pantitlán

Mexibús Line III was the second line in service. It runs 23 kilometers from Pantitlán (transfer for multiple lines of the Mexico City Metro) in Mexico City proper to Chimalhuacán and Chicoloapan municipalities of the State of Mexico. The concessionaire is Red de Transporte de Oriente S.A. de C.V. There are 45 stations, 3 terminals, and 85 buses. The line began construction at the end of 2010, and began operations on 30 April 2013.

==== Line IV: La Raza – Universidad Mexiquense del Bicentenario ====
Mexibús Line IV is the fourth line in service. It runs 22.3 kilometers from La Raza (transport hub for multiple transport services) in Mexico City proper to Ojo de Agua, Tecámac, Mexico. The concessionaire is Transmasivo. There are 30 stations, 2 terminals, and 71 buses. The line began construction in June 2014, and was expected to open since 2015. It started free pre-operative tests on 24 February 2021. Operations started on 9 October 2021. On 7 April 2024, the southern expansion from the Indios Verdes station to the La Raza metro station station came into operation.

=== Fare and schedule ===
The fare is 10 Mexican pesos (MXN) paid via rechargeable cards which cost 20 pesos and include 10 pesos in transit credit.

Service operates daily from 4:30 A.M. to 12:30 A.M.

== Expansion ==
Mexibús plans to extend Line IV to Felipe Ángeles International Airport ("AIFA") by 2023, adding to current service that Line I provides.

=== Line V: Lechería – El Rosario ===
On 24 July 2024, the state government announced a new line that would run from Lechería, Tultitlán, to Metrobús El Rosario, in Azcapotzalco, Mexico City. It is expected to run up to 22 kilometers along Vía Gustavo Baz in Cuautitlán Izcalli and Western Tlalnepantla de Baz, State of Mexico. Its construction will start in 2026.

=== Line VI: Lerma – Zinacantepec ===
On 19 November 2024, a line was announced to run from Lerma railway station, in the municipality of the same name, to Zinacantepec. It would benefit the municipalities of Zinacatepec, Toluca, Metepec, San Mateo Atenco and Lerma.

=== Line VII: Vicente Villada – Panteón de los Rosales ===
The line will start at the Vicente Villada station of Line III in Nezahualcóyotl and it will run along Avenida Chimalhuacán 3.5 kilometers until it reaches the CBTIS 6 institution and then until the Panteón de los Rosales municipal cemetery.

=== Map ===
Mexibús network: lines I–IV in service; V under construction; VI, VII and VIII (dashed) planned or estimated
