= San Rafael railway station (Tlalnepantla de Baz) =

San Rafael
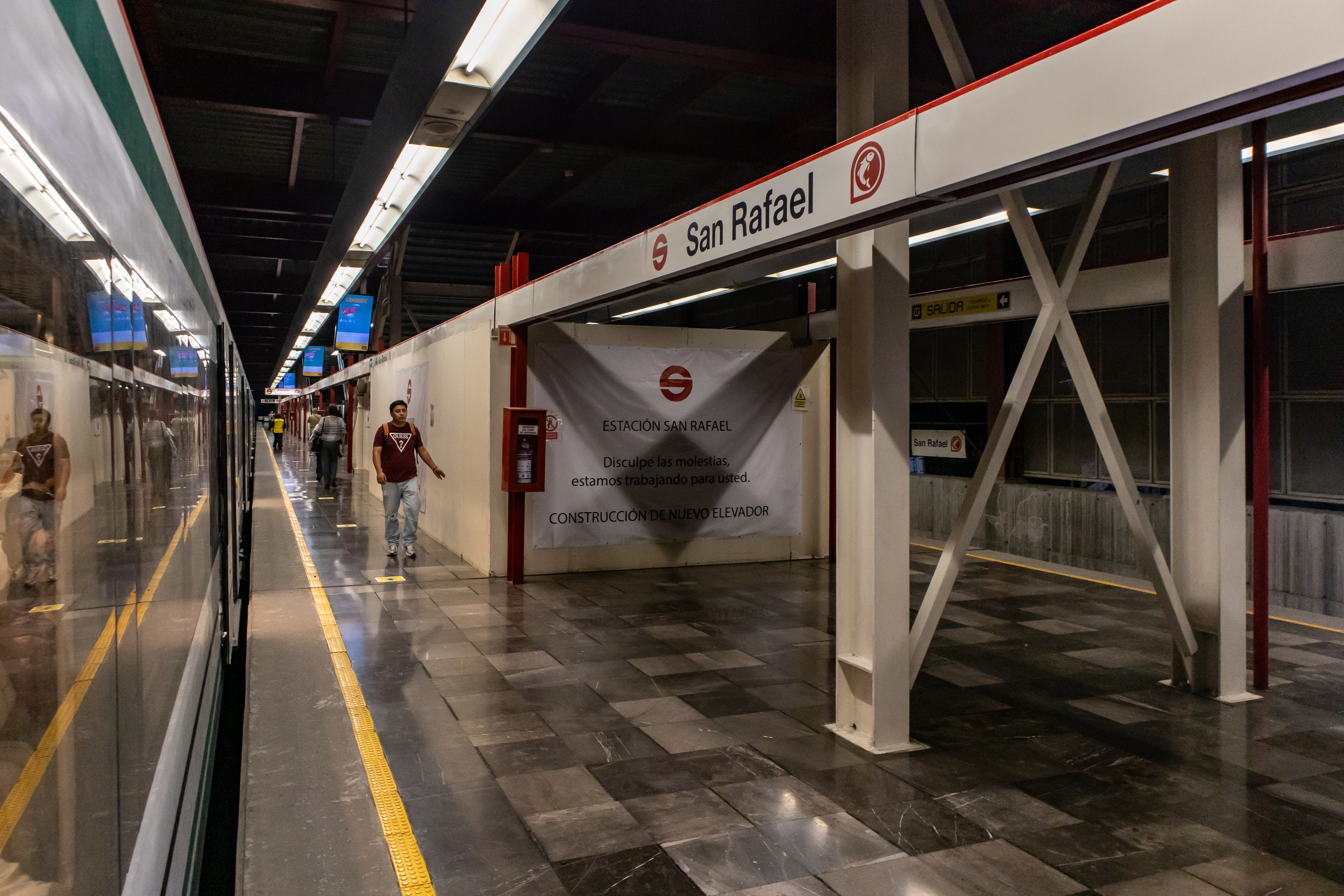

General information
- Location: Tlalnepantla, State of Mexico; Mexico
- Coordinates: 19°33′55.2″N 99°11′43.4″W
- System: Commuter rail
- Owner: Ferrocarriles Suburbanos
- Operator: Ferrocarriles Suburbanos
- Platforms: 1 island platform
- Tracks: 2
- Connections: ETRAM San Rafael

Construction
- Structure type: At grade
- Accessible: yes

History
- Opened: 2 June 2008; 18 years ago

Services
Preceding station	Tren Suburbano	Following station
Tlalnepantla toward Buenavista	Line 1	Lechería toward Cuautitlán
Preceding station	Tren Interurbano	Following station
Tlalnepantla toward Buenavista	Felipe Ángeles	Lechería toward AIFA–Clara Krause
Route map
Location
- Location within Mexico City urban area
- Area map and layout

San Rafael is a commuter railway station serving the Tren Suburbano and Felipe Ángeles suburban rail systems that connect the State of Mexico with Mexico City. The station is located in the municipality of Tlalnepantla, State of Mexico, north of Mexico City.

== General information ==
San Rafael station is located in the San Rafael industrial area in Tlalnepantla and it is the fourth station of the system going northbound from Buenavista. The station mainly services the factories area as well as inhabitants of the Tlayapa neighborhood.

As with Mexico City Metro, each station of the Ferrocarril Suburbano has a pictogram. San Rafael's pictogram depicts a fish. In many representations, Saint Raphael can be seen holding a fish, therefore, a fish was chosen as the station's pictogram.

Jardines del Recuerdo, one of Greater Mexico City's most notable graveyards is located near the station.

== History ==
San Rafael station opened on 2 June 2008 as part of the first stretch of system 1 of the Ferrocarril Suburbano, going from Buenavista in Mexico City to the Lechería station in the State of Mexico.

Before its construction, most of the area was barren land, except for the nearby factories. Illegal housing could also be found in the zone. Once the construction of San Rafael station was announced and after the station was inaugurated, several housing projects were developed in the area.

During its first years of operation, San Rafael station reported very little ridership. In occasions, trains would stop at the station as it is customary, but would not open the doors, since there were no passengers at the station.

In 2009, between San Rafael and Lechería station, two trains crashed, with around 100 people injured.

== Station layout ==
G	Street Level	Exits/Entrances
Platforms	Northbound	← toward Cuautitlán (Lechería) ← Felipe Ángeles toward AIFA–Clara Krause (Lechería)
Platforms	Island platform, doors will open on the left
Platforms	Southbound	toward Buenavista (Tlalnepantla)→ Felipe Ángeles toward Buenavista (Tlalnepantla) →
