= Tlalnepantla railway station =

Tlalnepantla
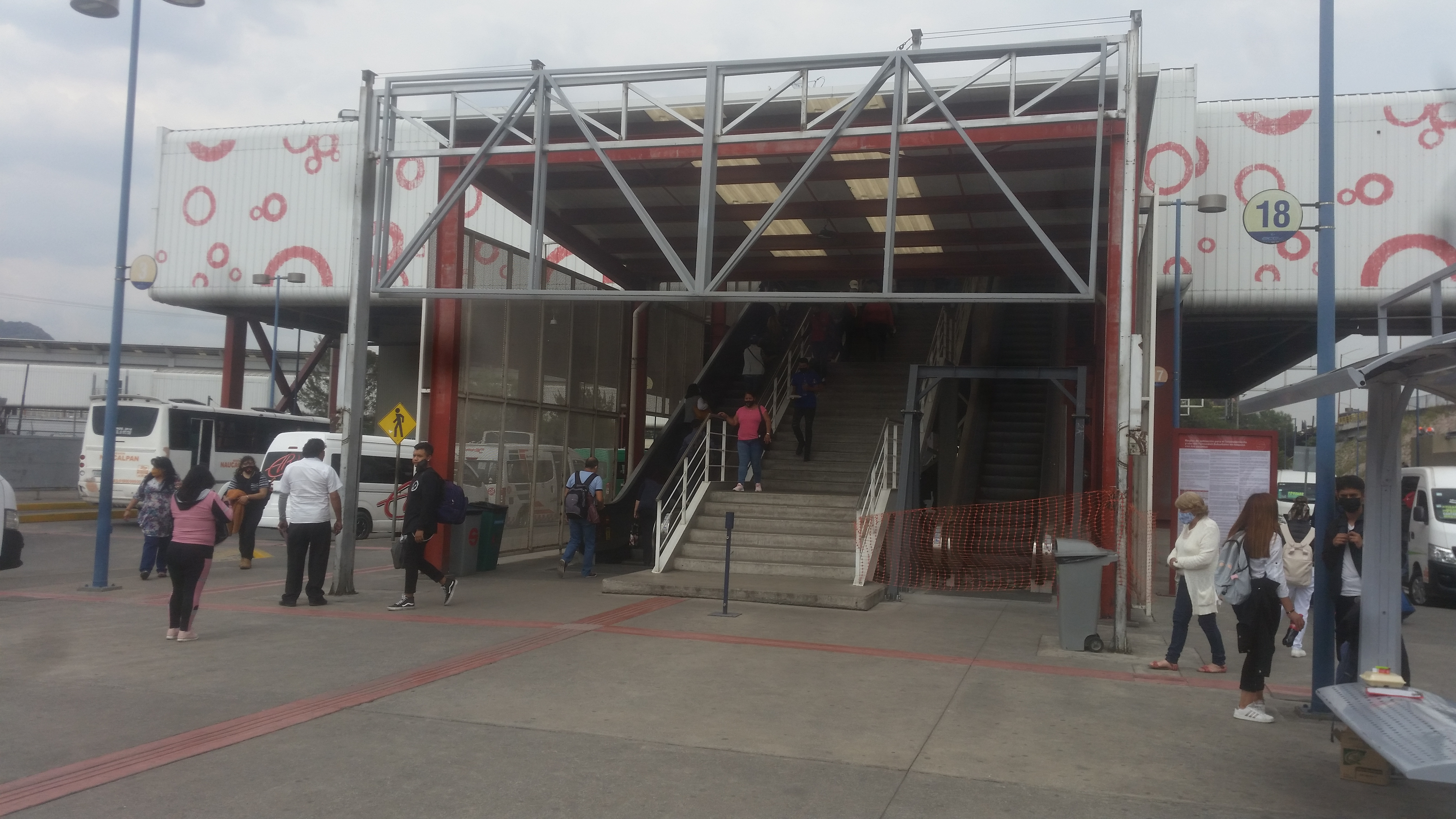

General information
- Location: Tlalnepantla, State of Mexico; Mexico
- Coordinates: 19°32′11.9″N 99°11′02.2″W
- System: Commuter rail
- Owner: Ferrocarriles Suburbanos
- Operator: Ferrocarriles Suburbanos
- Platforms: 1 island platform
- Tracks: 2
- Connections: ETRAM Tlalnepantla

Construction
- Structure type: At grade
- Accessible: yes

History
- Opened: 2 June 2008; 18 years ago

Services
Preceding station	Tren Suburbano	Following station
Fortuna toward Buenavista	Line 1	San Rafael toward Cuautitlán
Preceding station	Tren Interurbano	Following station
Fortuna toward Buenavista	Felipe Ángeles	San Rafael toward AIFA–Clara Krause
Route map
Location
- Location within Mexico City urban area
- Area map and layout

Tlalnepantla is a commuter railway station serving the Tren Suburbano and Felipe Ángeles suburban rail systems that connect the State of Mexico with Mexico City. The station is located in the municipality of Tlalnepantla, State of Mexico, north of Mexico City.

== General information ==
Tlalnepantla station is located between the San Javier and Ceylan neighborhoods in the Tlalnepantla municipality, State of Mexico. It is the third station of the system going northbound from Buenavista and the first one to be located in the State of Mexico. The station is located relatively close to downtown Tlalnepantla.

As with Mexico City Metro, each station of the Ferrocarril Suburbano has a pictogram. Tlalnepantla's pictogram depicts the façade of the pyramid of Santa Cecilia Acatitlán, an archeological zone in Tlalnepantla discovered between 1923 and 1924.

The station opened on 2 June 2008 as part of the first stretch of system 1 of the Ferrocarril Suburbano, going from Buenavista in Mexico City to the Lechería station in the State of Mexico.

== Station layout ==
G	Street Level	Exits/Entrances
Platforms	Northbound	← toward Cuautitlán (San Rafael) ← Felipe Ángeles toward AIFA–Clara Krause (San Rafael)
Platforms	Island platform, doors will open on the left
Platforms	Southbound	toward Buenavista (Fortuna)→ Felipe Ángeles toward Buenavista (Fortuna)→
