= Fortuna railway station (Mexico City) =

Commuter rail station in Mexico

Fortuna
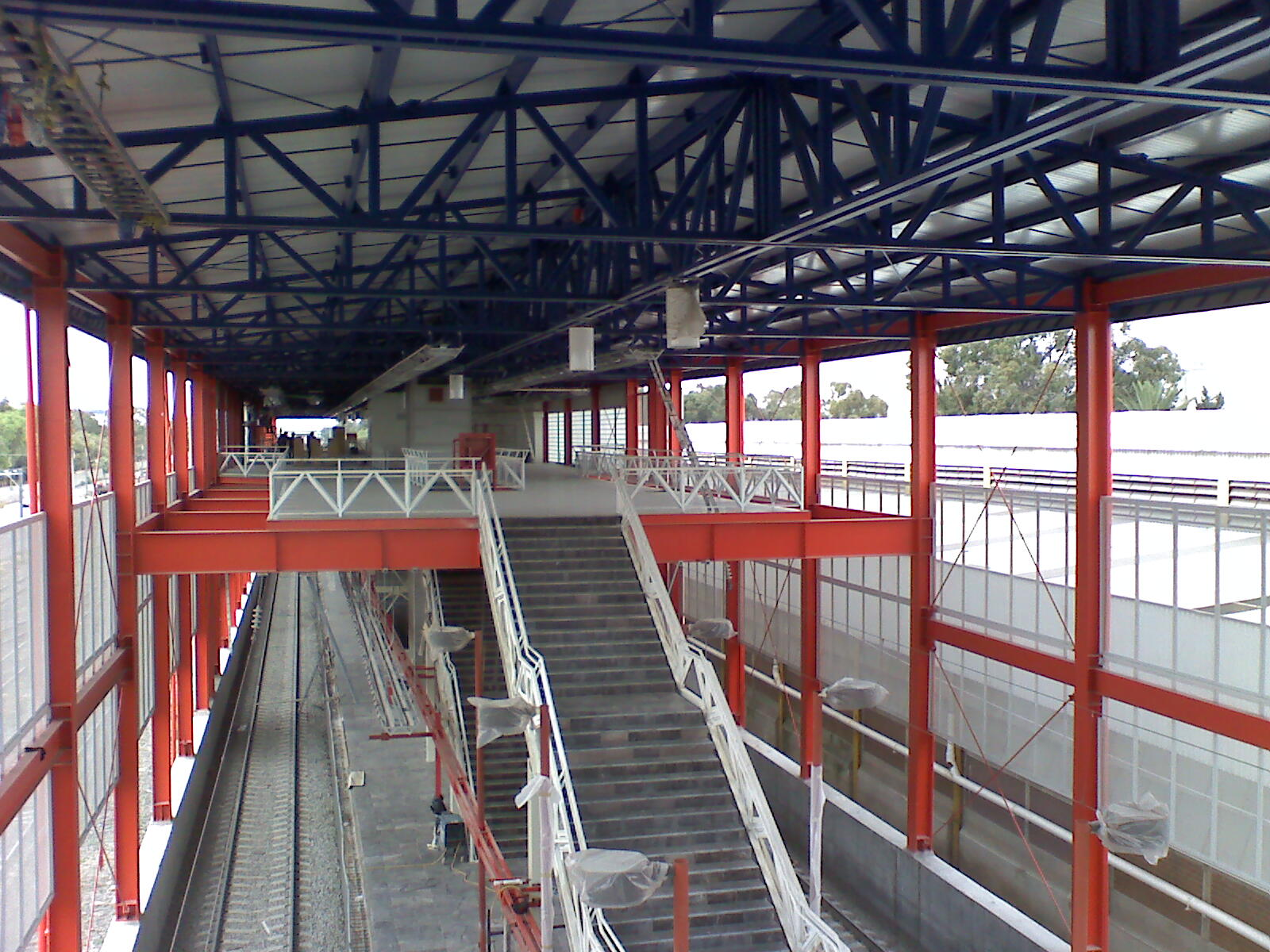

General information
- Location: Azcapotzalco, Mexico City; Mexico
- Coordinates: 19°29′31.5″N 99°10′16.3″W
- System: Commuter rail
- Owner: Ferrocarriles Suburbanos
- Operator: Ferrocarriles Suburbanos
- Platforms: 1 island platform
- Tracks: 2
- Connections: Ferrería/Arena Ciudad de México CETRAM Fortuna

Construction
- Structure type: At grade
- Cycle facilities: Bicycle parking (closed)
- Accessible: yes

History
- Opened: 2 June 2008; 18 years ago

Services
Preceding station	Tren Suburbano	Following station
Buenavista Terminus	Line 1	Tlalnepantla toward Cuautitlán
Preceding station	Tren Interurbano	Following station
Buenavista Terminus	Felipe Ángeles	Tlalnepantla toward AIFA–Clara Krause
Route map
Location
- Location within Mexico City
- Area map and layout

Fortuna is a commuter railway station serving the Tren Suburbano and Felipe Ángeles suburban rail system that connects the State of Mexico with Mexico City. The station is located in the municipality of Azcapotzalco in the northern part of Mexico City.

== General information ==
Fortuna station is located in the Azcapotzalco municipality in Mexico City. It is the second station of the system going northbound from Buenavista and the last one to be located within Mexico City Proper.

The station is located a few meters away from Metro Ferrería/Arena Ciudad de México, servicing Mexico City Metro Line 6. Therefore, it is possible for users to connect here with the Metro network. Arena Ciudad de México, an indoor sports and entertainment venue, is also within walking distance from Fortuna station.

As with Mexico City Metro, each station of the Ferrocarril Suburbano has a pictogram. Fortuna's pictogram depicts four crosses. According to its designer, Alejandro Sarabia, they represent the several hospitals that are located in the area.

== History ==
Fortuna station opened on 2 June 2008 as part of the first stretch of system 1 of the Ferrocarril Suburbano, going from Buenavista in Mexico City to the Lechería station in the State of Mexico.

Fortuna, alongside Buenavista, are the only two Ferrocarril Suburbano stations that connect with Mexico City Metro. The station connects with Ferrería/Arena Ciudad de México metro station through an underground tunnel.

== Station layout ==
G	Street level	Exits/Entrances
B Platforms	Northbound	← toward Cuautitlán (Tlalnepantla) ← Felipe Ángeles toward AIFA–Clara Krause (Tlalnepantla)
B Platforms	Island platform, doors will open on the left
B Platforms	Southbound	toward Buenavista (terminus)→ Felipe Ángeles toward Buenavista (terminus)→
