= Cueyamil railway station =

Rail station in Tultitlán, Mexico

Cueyamil
- Cueyamil station during its opening, as seen from Recursos Hidráulicos Avenue

General information
- Location: Recursos Hidráulicos Avenue, Tultitlán, State of Mexico; Mexico
- Coordinates: 19°37′42″N 99°10′01″W
- System: Felipe Ángeles
- Owner: Federal government of Mexico
- Operator: Secretariat of National Defense
- Platforms: 1 island platform
- Tracks: 2
- Connections: Cueyamil

Construction
- Structure type: At grade
- Accessible: Yes

History
- Opened: 26 April 2026; 6 months ago

Services
Preceding station	Tren Interurbano	Following station
Lechería toward Buenavista	Felipe Ángeles	La Loma toward AIFA–Clara Krause
Route map
Location
- Location within Mexico City urban area
- Area map and layout

The Cueyamil railway station is a commuter railway station of the Felipe Ángeles suburban rail system, located in the municipality of Tultitlán, in the State of Mexico, between Lechería and La Loma stations. It is a railway stop with one island platform.

The Cueyamil railway station opened on 26 April 2026, serving the colonias (neighborhood) of Cueyamil and Buenavista, along Avenida Recursos Hidráulicos. The station offers accessible service. Outside, there is a transportation hub.

From the planning stage onward, residents raised concerns about the station, primarily regarding how they would cross the railway tracks, as there was no nearby pedestrian bridge. They later reported flooding caused by the station's wall and inefficient hydraulic infrastructure. On 6 September 2026, six people died next to the station from gas inhalation during a flood.

== Location and layout ==
The Cueyamil railway station is an at-grade stop with one island platform. It serves the colonias (neighborhood) of Cueyamil and Buenavista, along Avenida Recursos Hidráulicos.

The station and line offer accessible service with elevators and tactile paving. Outside, there is a transportation hub, Etram Cueyamil, intended to serve local routes, but, as of the station's opening, it was reported empty.

== History and construction ==
The Felipe Ángeles was originally intended to be built and operated by Construcciones y Auxiliar de Ferrocarriles (CAF), who operates the Tren Suburbano rail system, but in February 2025, President Claudia Sheinbaum ordered the Secretariat of National Defense (Sedena) to take charge of completing the line due to the slow construction progress, and thus CAF lost its operating concession from the Felipe Ángeles.

The construction of Cueyamil railway station raised concerns among local residents from the beginning of the project. As of January 2025, the station was the one with the least construction progress, including the installation of panels, railroad ties, rails, and the erection of a fence to prevent residents from crossing from Avenida Recursos Hidráulicos to Avenida Independencia. The residents had complained about the lack of a nearby pedestrian bridge, noting that there was none near the intersection.

In June 2025, the station's hub was reported to have claddings, domes, staircases, marble flooring, and signage, but still lacked a pedestrian bridge. As of September 2025, the Secretariat of Infrastructure, Communications and Transportation informed that there would be a bridge at the station's location. By March 2026, neighbors reported that it was unclear how the access would be from Avenida Recursos Hidráulicos.

Cueyamil railway station was opened on 26 April 2026, providing service northeastern toward AIFA–Clara Krause station, in Zumpango, and southbound toward Buenavista station, in Mexico City. Access from Avenida Recursos Hidráulicos is done through a bridge made of metal ladders, scaffolding, and wire mesh. Residents reported that Avenida Recursos Hidráulicos lacked paving and had potholes, and that the avenue and nearby residences were prone to flooding because the installed drainage system lacked sufficient capacity.

== Incidents ==
Workers repaving Avenida Recursos Hidráulicos accidentally punctured a natural gas pipeline on 15 April 2026. In June 2026, residents protested the unfinished construction work at the station's area, asking for the installation of appropriate hydraulic infrastructure, the construction of better access staircases, and the repair of a wall. Residents considered that the construction of the station has caused water to accumulate along the avenue because of the station's security wall. Residents stated that, before the station's construction, water reaching the area continued to flow without accumulating.

Near midnight, on 6 September 2026, following a rainy day, six people (two women and four men) died outside the station from gas inhalation while traveling in a shared public transit van. The vehicle was traveling along Avenida Recursos Hidráulicos, next to Cueyamil railway station, when it became stuck in the flooded street, covered by 60 centimeters (24 in) of water. According to early investigations, either the vehicle's liquefied petroleum gas line was accidentally damaged, causing gas to leak into the van, or its exhaust pipe became clogged with water, causing exhaust gases to enter the vehicle. The van's windows and doors were closed. Three people died inside the van, while three others managed to escape but collapsed in the street.

== Gallery ==
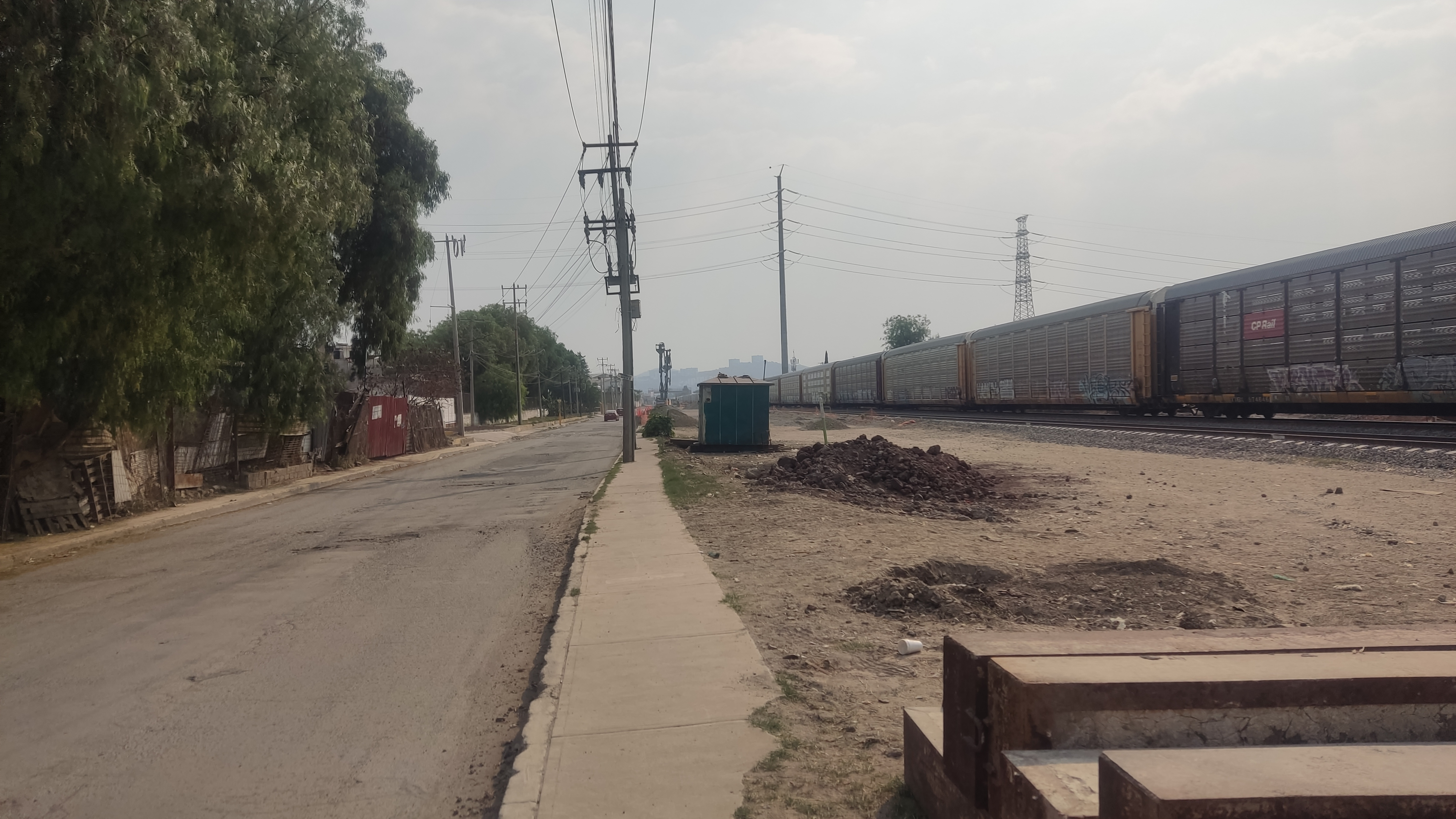
The area where Cueyamil railway station was built as of March 2024

The station under construction in August 2025

Entrance at the ETRAM

Entrance at Recursos Hidráulicos

The station's platform

Elevator at the ETRAM

ETRAM Cueyamil
