= Lechería railway station =

Rail station in Tultitlán, Mexico

Lechería
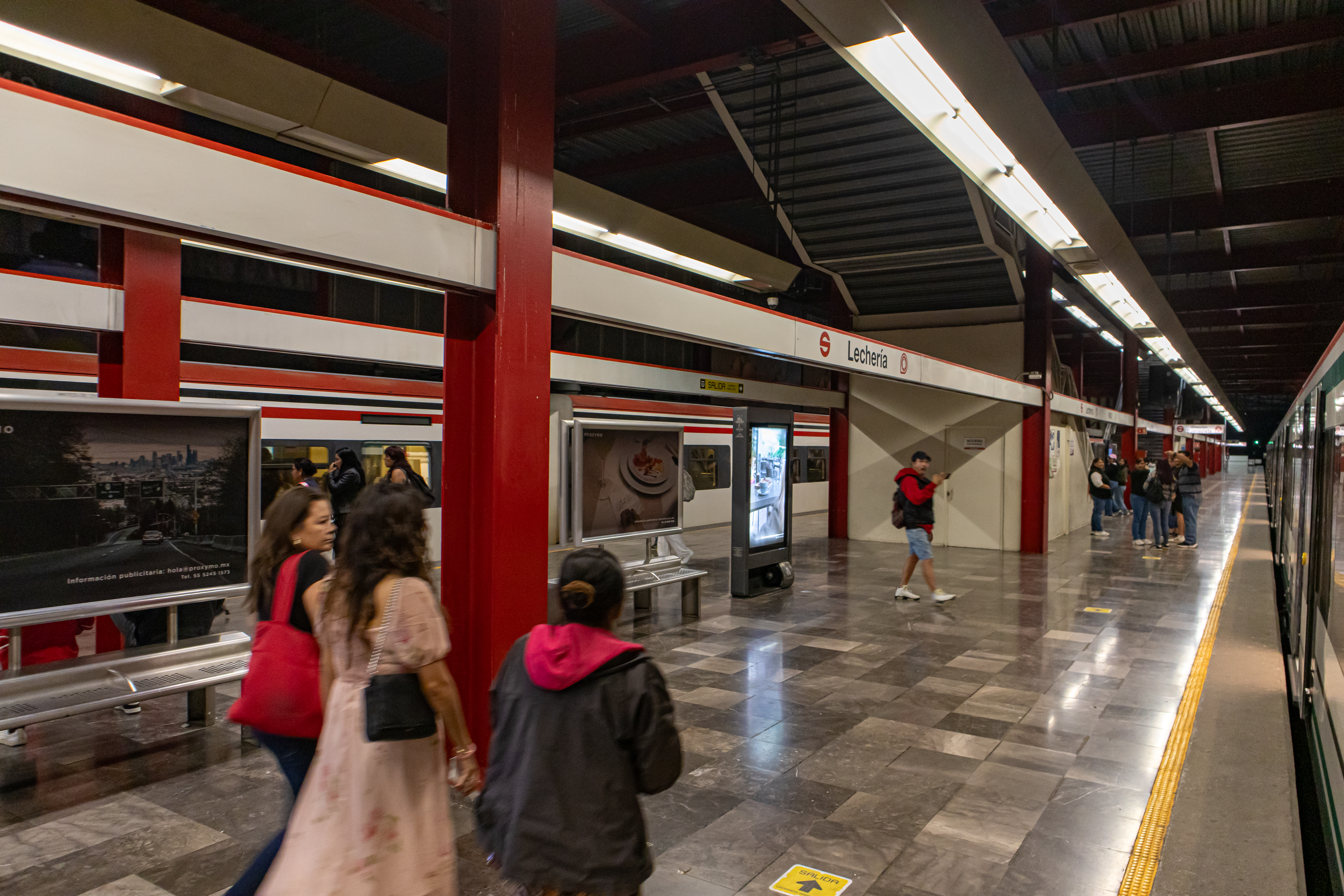

General information
- Location: Tultitlán, State of Mexico; Mexico
- Coordinates: 19°35′57.0″N 99°11′12.6″W
- System: Commuter rail
- Owner: Ferrocarriles Suburbanos
- Operator: Ferrocarriles Suburbanos
- Platforms: 1 island platform
- Tracks: 2
- Connections: Lechería; ETRAM Lechería

Construction
- Structure type: At grade
- Accessible: yes

History
- Opened: 2 June 2008; 18 years ago

Services
Preceding station	Tren Suburbano	Following station
San Rafael toward Buenavista	Line 1	Tultitlán toward Cuautitlán
Preceding station	Tren Interurbano	Following station
San Rafael toward Buenavista	Felipe Ángeles	Cueyamil toward AIFA–Clara Krause
Route map
Location
- Location within Mexico City urban area

Lechería is a commuter railway station serving the Tren Suburbano and Felipe Ángeles suburban rail systems that connect the State of Mexico with Mexico City. The station is located in the municipality of Tultitlán, State of Mexico, north of Mexico City.

== General information ==
Lechería station is located in the Lechería neighborhood in Tultitlán and it is the fifth station of the system going northbound from Buenavista.

As with Mexico City Metro, each station of the Ferrocarril Suburbano has a pictogram. Lecheria's pictogram depicts a cowbell due to the fact that this zone used to be part of the Hacienda de Lechería, that produced and distributed milk to the entire country.

== History ==
In 1880, the Mexican government gave the Compañía Bostoniana del Ferrocarril Central Mexicano a license to build a railway connecting Mexico City and Paso del Norte. One of the stations that was built for the route was Lechería. Nowadays, the old station is not in use anymore, but the building is listed in Mexico's railroad heritage.

The new station opened on 2 June 2008 as part of the first stretch of system 1 of the Ferrocarril Suburbano, going from Buenavista in Mexico City to the Lechería station in the State of Mexico.

Due to its location, Central American and Mexican migrants can be found near Lechería station. Until 2012, there was a shelter for migrants near the station, but due to complaints from the neighbors, the shelter was shut down. Nevertheless, migrants still appear in the station, usually asking for money or food.

In 2009, between San Rafael and Lechería, two trains crashed, with around 100 people injured.

In 2019, plans to extend the line with a new branch going from Lechería to the Felipe Ángeles International Airport were announced. The branch will help to connect Mexico City with the airport, located in Santa Lucía, Zumpango, State of Mexico.

== Station layout ==
G	Street Level	Exits/Entrances
G Platforms	Northbound	← toward Cuautitlán (Tultitlán) ← Felipe Ángeles toward AIFA–Clara Krause (Cueyamil)
G Platforms	Island platform, doors will open on the left
G Platforms	Southbound	toward Buenavista (San Rafael) → Felipe Ángeles toward Buenavista (San Rafael) →
