= Tultitlán railway station =

Tultitlán
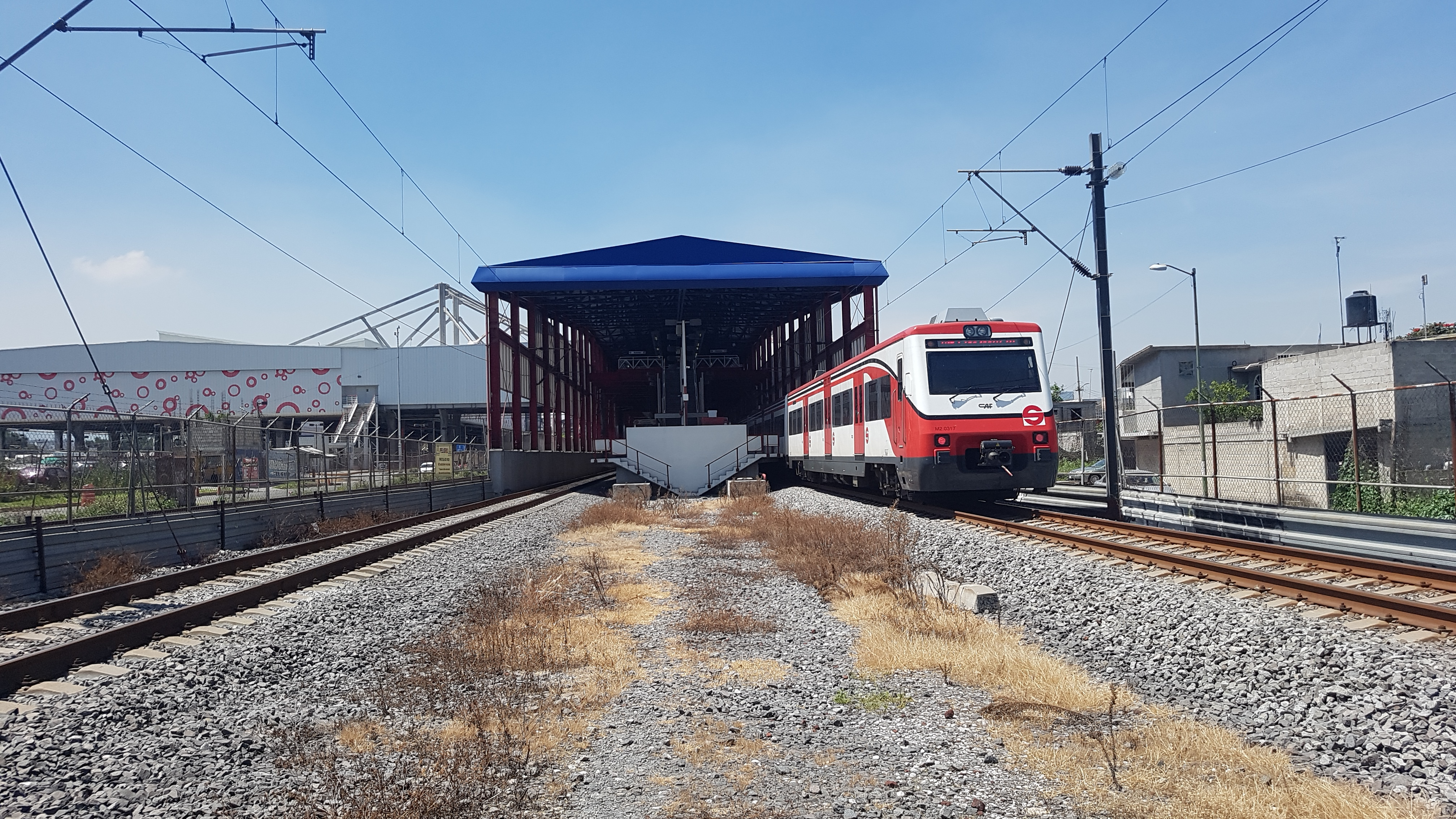

General information
- Location: Tultitlán, State of Mexico; Mexico
- Coordinates: 19.6354°N 99.1804°W
- System: Commuter rail
- Owner: Ferrocarriles Suburbanos
- Operator: Ferrocarriles Suburbanos
- Platforms: 1 island platform
- Tracks: 2
- Connections: ETRAM Tultitlán

Construction
- Structure type: At grade
- Cycle facilities: Bicycle parking-only
- Accessible: yes

History
- Opened: 5 January 2009; 17 years ago

Services
| Preceding station | Tren Suburbano | Following station |
|---|---|---|
| Lechería toward Buenavista | Line 1 | Cuautitlán Terminus |
Route map
Location
- Location within Mexico City urban area
- Area map and layout

Tultitlán is a commuter railway station serving the Ferrocarril Suburbano, a suburban rail that connects the State of Mexico with Mexico City. The station is located in the municipality of Tultitlán, State of Mexico, north of Mexico City.

== General information ==
Tultitlán station is located in the La Cocila neighborhood in Tultitlán and it is the sixth station of the system going northbound from Buenavista.

Like with Lechería station, Central American and Mexican migrants can be found near Tultitlán station.

== History ==
Tultitlán station was opened on 5 January 2009 as part of the second stretch of system 1 of the Ferrocarril Suburbano, going from Buenavista in Mexico City to Cuautitlán station in the State of Mexico.

== Station layout ==
| G | Street Level | Exits/Entrances |
| G Platforms | Northbound | ← toward Cuautitlán (Terminus) |
| G Platforms | Island platform, doors will open on the left |
| G Platforms | Southbound | toward Buenavista (Lechería)→ |
