= Lechería =

Lechería (Spanish for "dairy") may refer to:

== Mexico ==
- Autopista Chamapa-Lechería, a toll road in Greater Mexico City
- Lechería railway station of the Mexico City suburban train system Ferrocarril Suburbano
- Lechería (Mexibús), a BRT station in Tultitlán, Mexico

== Venezuela ==
- Lechería, Anzoátegui, Diego Bautista Urbaneja Municipality, Venezuela
