= AIFA =

AIFA or Aifa may refer to:

- American Indoor Football Association, in the US
- Felipe Ángeles International Airport (AIFA), opened in 2022, near Mexico City
  - AIFA–Clara Krause railway station, a Tren Felipe Ángeles station
- Italian Medicines Agency (Agenzia italiana del farmaco)

== People with the name ==
- Aifa Azman (born 2001), Malaysian squash player
- Jean-Pierre Aïfa, a president of the Congress of New Caledonia
