= Tarjeta de Movilidad Integrada =

Transport card in Mexico City

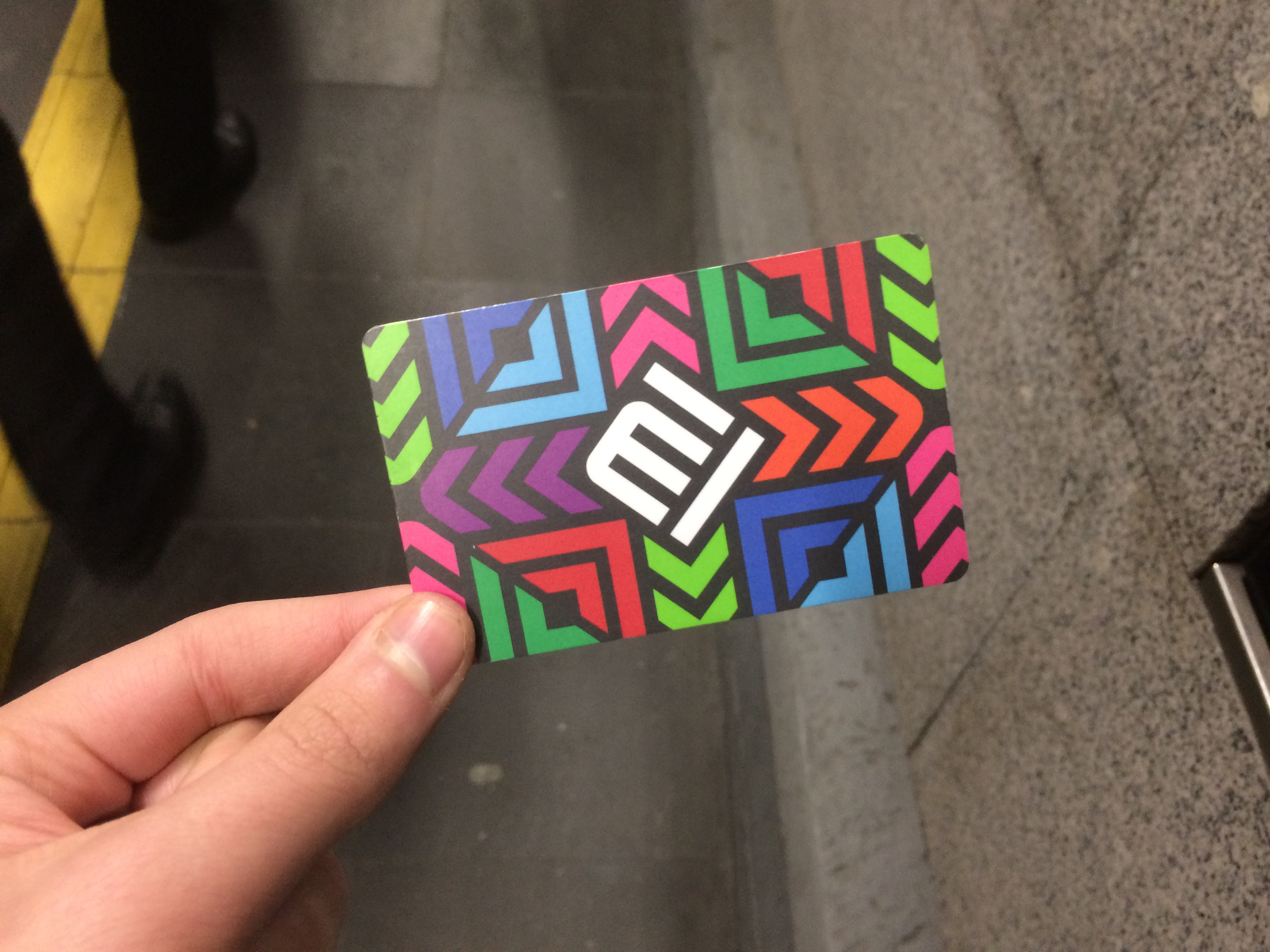
- Location: Mexico City
- Launched: June 19, 2005: as "Tarjeta Metrobús"; September - December, 2012: as "Tarjeta DF"; October 17, 2019 as "Tarjeta de Movilidad Integrada"
- Technology: Calypso
- Manager: Government of Mexico City
- Currency: Mexican peso (500$ MXN maximum balance)
- Credit expiry: 300 days after last use; card continues active indefinetly
- Validity: STC Metro; Metrobús; Ecobici; Cablebús; Tren Ligero; RTP; Trolebús
- Retailed: Metro stations; Metrobús stations; Cablebús stations; Tren Ligero stations

The Tarjeta de Movilidad Integrada (MI; literal English translation: Integrated Mobility Card) is a contactless smart card introduced in Mexico City in October 2005 as "Tarjeta Metrobús". It is used on the public transport system of Mexico City as a fare card. It offers interoperability with the Metro, Metrobús, Ecobici, Cablebús, Tren Ligero, RTP, Trolleybus and Tren Interurbano systems.

== Background ==
In 1986, the Mexico City Government (then called Distrito Federal), implemented a plastic card called Abono for the STC Metr, this card was used similarly to the paper ticket used but with the difference that it could be reused multiple times, unlike the paper ticket that was usable only once. The card was sold from 1986 until its discontinuation in 1995.

Pilot programs for a card that could work with all of the city's transport system started in October 2005 with the STC Metro for users that are exempted from paying to access the system (STC employees, users with evident disabilities and users over 70). The first card that was available to the general public that served the all-in-one features was released on June 17, 2006.

=== Tarjeta Metrobús ===
On June 19, 2005, the first line of the Metrobús system was opened to the public. The service used a pre-paid contactless card called "Tarjeta Metrobús" that to be top-up by the user at top-up stations.

All Tarjeta Metrobús cards remained valid until February 21, 2020.

=== Tarjeta Distrito Federal (TDF) ===
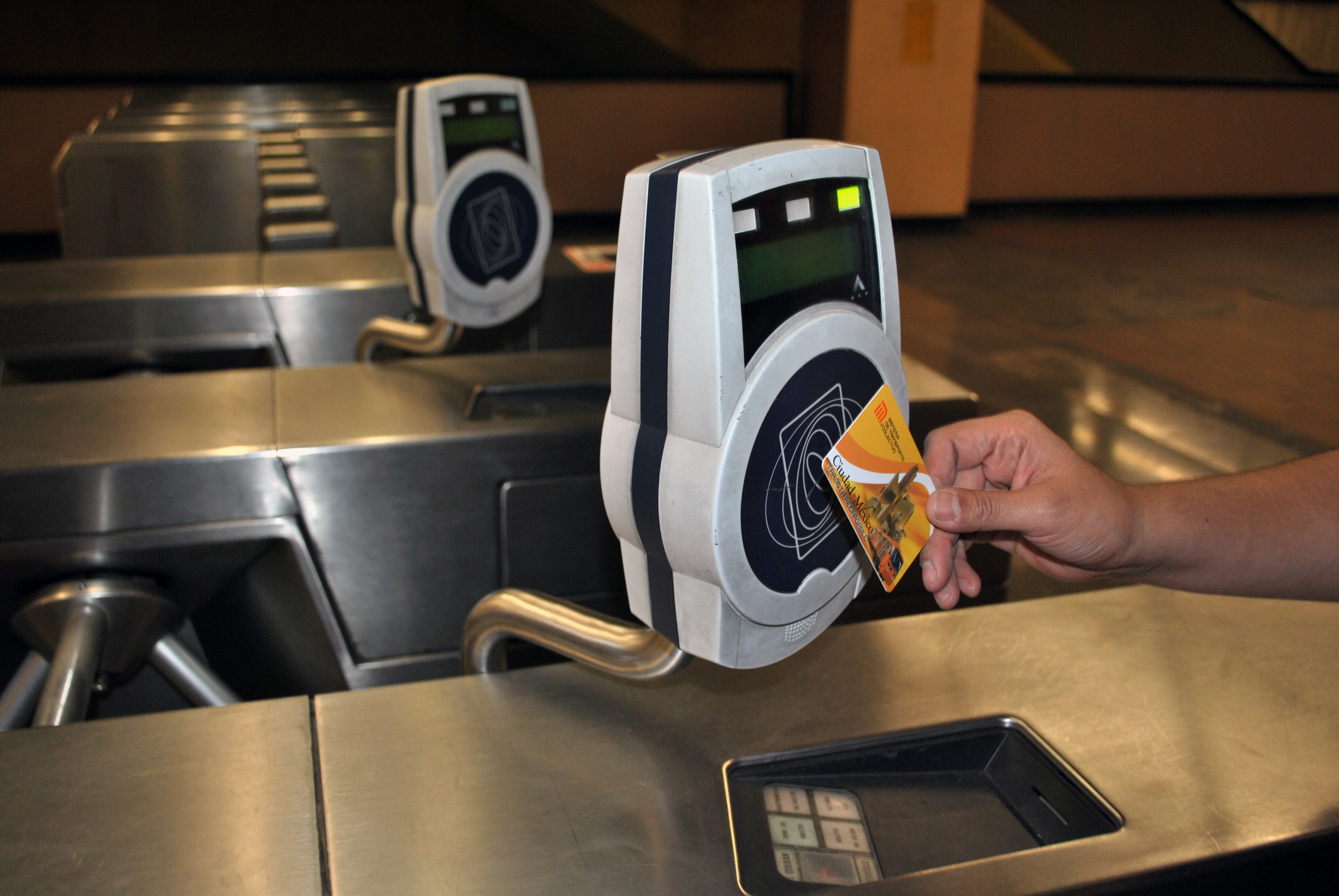
The former smart card

On October 17, 2012, the Tarjeta Distrito Federal (literal English translation: Federal District Card) was released along the inauguration of the 12th line of the Mexico City Metro, a line that can only be accessed with the card. In 2016, the then governor Miguel Ángel Mancera renamed the card to Tarjeta CDMX after the Federal District was renamed to Mexico City.

The card was discontinued on January 30, 2020, with all TDF cards remaining valid until January 31, 2020. They were replaced with the Tarjeta de Movilidad Integrada.

== Uses ==
Most of the systems covered by the card (Tren Interurbano's logo is missing only)

The Integrated Movility card is used by most of the official transportation systems in Mexico City.

Systems that support the Tarjeta de Movilidad Integrada card (as of December 2021)
| System | Cost of entry | Topup | Availability |
|---|---|---|---|
| Mexico City Metro | $5 MXN per entry | Ticket office and Top-up machines inside the station | Active since October 2019 |
| Mexico City Metrobús | $6 MXN per entry | Top-up machines inside the station | Active since October 2019 |
| Cablebús | $7 MXN per entry | Top-up machines inside the station | Active since July 2021 |
| Tren Ligero | $3 MXN per entry | Top-up machines inside the station | Active since October 2019 |
| Trolebús | $3 MXN per entry | - | Active in most routes; since January 2020 |
| Ecobici | - | - | Active since October 2019 |
| Red de Transporte de Pasajeros (RTP) | $2-5 MXN per entry | - | Active in most routes; since January 2020 |
| Tren Interurbano | $11.50–90 MXN, varies per distance traveled | Top-up machines inside the station | Active since September 2023 |
| Bike parking lots | - | - | Active since December 2019 |
