= Tren Suburbano =

Suburban rail system in Mexico City

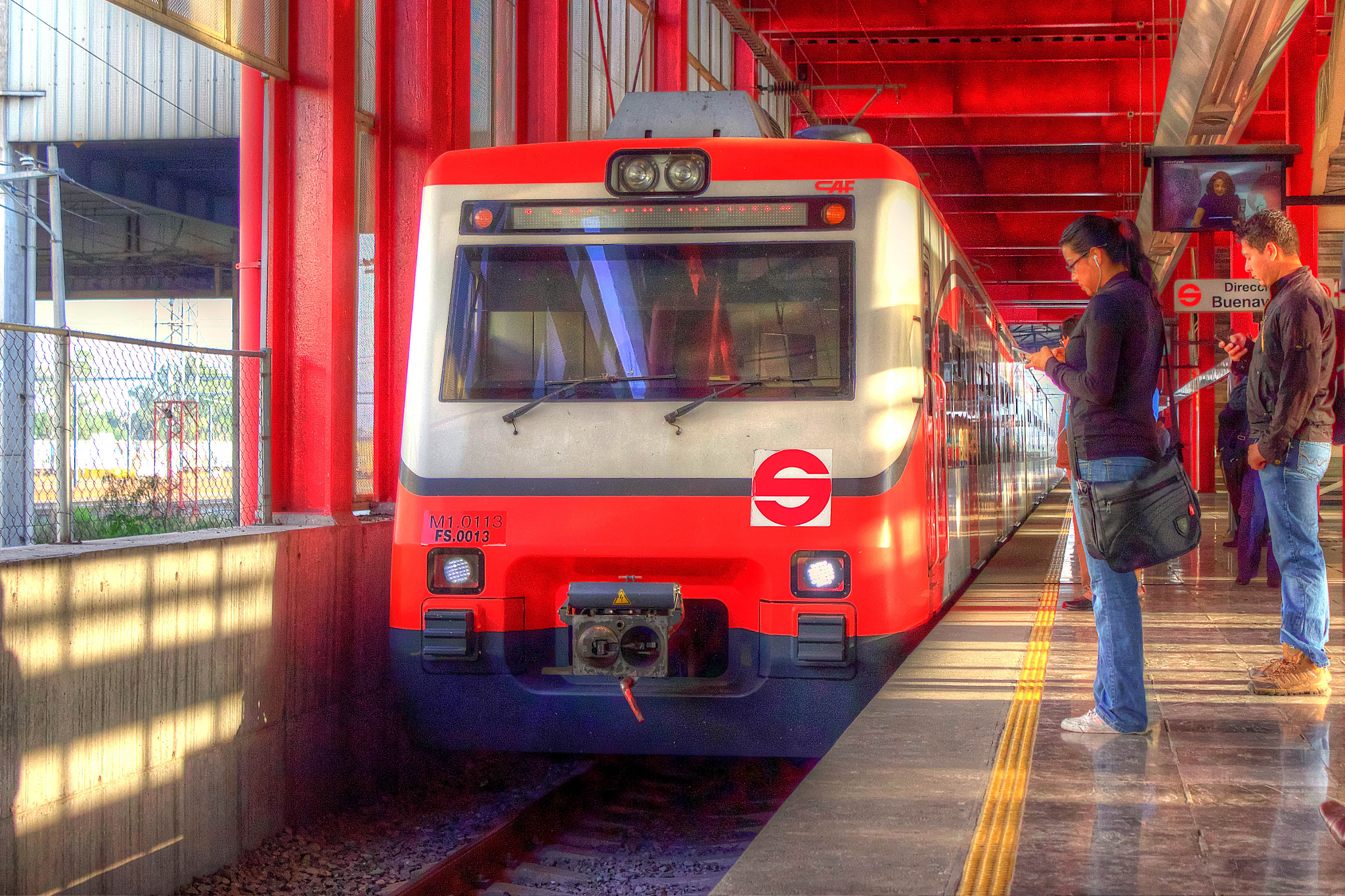
- Tlalnepantla Station

Overview
- Locale: Mexico City and State of Mexico, Mexico
- Transit type: Suburban rail
- Number of lines: 1
- Number of stations: 7
- Daily ridership: 200,000 (2018)
- Headquarters: Mexico City
- Website: Ferrocarriles Suburbanos

Operation
- Began operation: June 2, 2008
- Operators: Ferrocarriles Suburbanos, S.A. de C.V.
- Reporting marks: S

Technical
- System length: 27 km (17 mi)
- Track gauge: 1,435 mm (4 ft 8 1/2 in)
- Electrification: Overhead line, 25 kV 60 Hz AC
System map
Line 1 route highlighted in gray

The Tren Suburbano (lit. 'Suburban Train') (Note: Official name: Ferrocarril Suburbano de la Zona Metropolitana del Valle de México (lit. 'Suburban Railway of the Valley of Mexico Metropolitan Area)') is an electric suburban rail system in Mexico City. Line 1 is operated by Ferrocarriles Suburbanos with concessioned trains from Construcciones y Auxiliar de Ferrocarriles (CAF). It was designed to complement the extensive Mexico City metro system, Latin America's largest and busiest urban rail network. The railway has one operative line with a length of 27 km (17 mi) with seven stations, located in Cuauhtémoc and Azcapotzalco in Mexico City, and Tlalnepantla, Tultitlán and Cuautitlán, in the State of Mexico.

A second line opened in April 2026 to connect with the Felipe Ángeles International Airport (AIFA) in Zumpango. Originally intended to be operated by Ferrocarriles Suburbanos, in 2025, the concession was waived to the Secretariat of National Defense. In April 2026, the government of Mexico announced the intention to purchase the concession of the Tren Suburbano consession from CAF.

Additional expansions were proposed in the 2000s with a total length of 242 kilometres (150 mi) of rail system.

== History ==
=== Background ===
==== Mexico–Querétaro electric railway ====
In 1978, the Secretariat of Communications and Transportation proposed the construction of the first Mexican double-track electric railway powered by overhead catenary. Based on a study prepared by the government agency, the Mexico City-Querétaro route was determined to be the most viable for electrification due to its high passenger and freight traffic, topography almost lacking gradients, and strategic location in the centre of the country.

In 1979, as part of the construction works, the Mexican government included Japanese, British and French participation in the project. The locomotives used were designed and assembled by the company General Electric in the Mexican state of Aguascalientes between 1980 and 1982. The locomotive model was designated General Electric E60-C2.

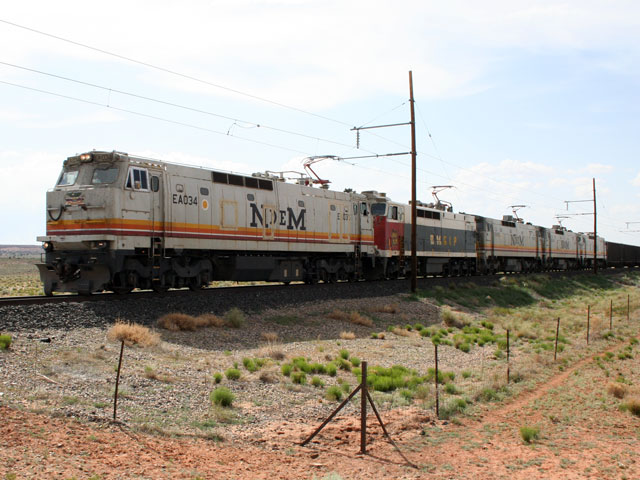
Electric locomotive General Electric E60-C2

By 1983, the Secretariat of Communications and Transportation decided to suspend the project due to changes in route alignments and operating policies. In 1986, electrification resumed only with the participation of technical staff from the Secretariat, National Railways of Mexico, and the French company Societe Francais d'Etudes et de Realisations Ferroviaires (Sofrerail), today SYSTRA S.A.

In 1996, Ernesto Zedillo, President of Mexico from 1994 to 2000, removed the parastatal company National Railways of Mexico from state control, and passenger transport operations throughout the country were terminated. In the years following privatization, three passenger routes were created for tourism purposes: the Chihuahua-Pacific Railway (Chepe), the Tequila Express, and the Expreso Maya (without commercial operations since 25 June 2007).

=== A new project: the suburban railway ===
Proposed suburban railway project by the federal government between 1999 and 2011

In 1997, the federal government proposed the creation of a commuter rail line on the right-of-way of the former railway to Cuernavaca. This route would be 24 kilometres long between Avenida Ejército Nacional and the Pedregal de San Nicolás neighbourhood, would connect with four lines of the Mexico City Metro, and would transport 42,000 passengers daily.

In 1999, Óscar Santiago Corzo Cruz, director of the General Directorate of Tariffs, Railway and Multimodal Transport of the Secretariat of Communications and Transportation, raised the possibility of building a network of commuter rail lines on the 242 kilometres of rail network in the Valley of Mexico. The network would consist of three trunk systems: from the former Buenavista railway station in Mexico City to the municipality of Cuautitlán in the State of Mexico; from Ecatepec to Naucalpan, both in the State of Mexico; and from La Paz to the Bosque de San Juan de Aragón in Mexico City. The last two itineraries would pass through Buenavista station. Each trunk system would include branches to meet demand in neighbouring municipalities: Nextlalpan, Tecamac, San Juan Teotihuacán, Texcoco, and Chalco.

Corzo Cruz noted that the elevated train or Ecotren project would require the expropriation of land and the creation of new rights-of-way. The commuter rail project would not require these measures, since it would use right-of-way owned by the federal government. In addition, the suburban railway would be aimed at lower-income sectors of the population. In its first stage it would serve 465,000 passengers along 27 kilometres between Buenavista station and Cuautitlán.

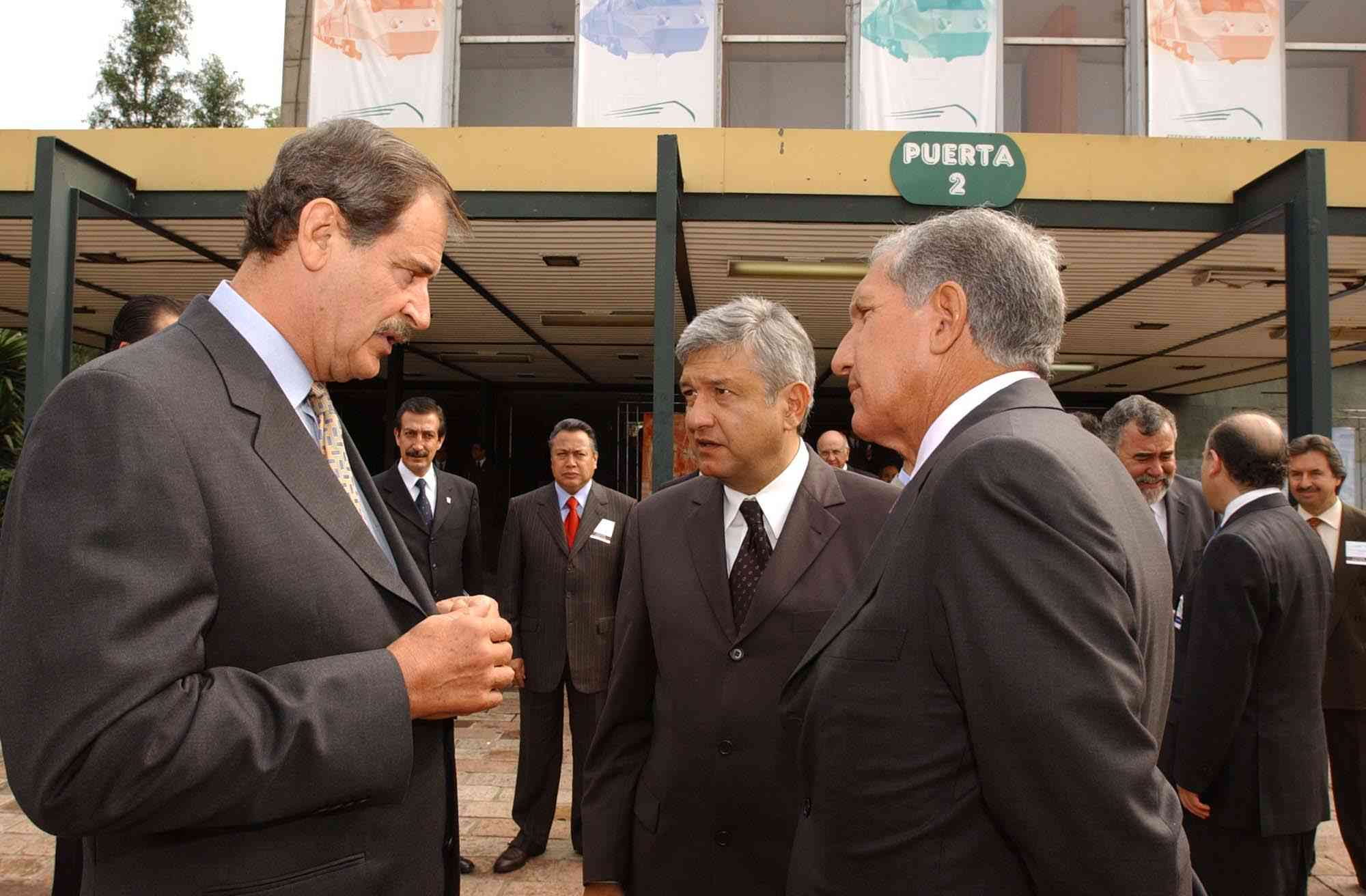
Vicente Fox, Andrés Manuel López Obrador and Arturo Montiel Rojas during the signing of the agreement for the construction of the suburban railway (11 June 2003)

When Vicente Fox became President of Mexico, in 2000, authorities of the Secretariat of Communications and Transportation again proposed creating a network of commuter rail lines to meet the urban transport demand of the Metropolitan Area of the Valley of Mexico.

In June 2001, Víctor Félix Flores Morales, general secretary of the Mexican Railway Workers Union, informed the media that the Secretariat of Communications and Transportation was conducting feasibility studies for the construction of a suburban railway in the northern zone of the Federal District. He stated that the railway would help speed up passenger transport in the area and would represent an alternative route to the Mexico City Metro. One of the terminals would be located at the former Buenavista railway terminal and the system would operate with 15 trains.

After a series of discussions and agreements between the federal government and the local governments of the Federal District and the State of Mexico, it was decided to build the first suburban railway system largely based on the radial trains project proposed in 1998.

On 11 June 2003, at the former Buenavista railway station, President Fox attended the signing of the cooperation agreement between Pedro Cerisola y Weber, secretary of Communications and Transportation (2000–2006); Andrés Manuel López Obrador, Head of Government of the Federal District (2000–2005); and Arturo Montiel Rojas, governor of the State of Mexico (1999–2005), for the construction of the Suburban Railway Project of the Metropolitan Area of the Valley of Mexico.

On 11 December 2003, the Secretariat of Communications and Transportation published the tender for the construction of System 1 of the Buenavista–Cuautitlán Suburban Railway. The companies that entered the tender process were: Bombardier Transportation; Ferrosur, SA de CV; Alstom Transporte, SA de CV; Construcciones y Auxiliares de Ferrocarriles, SA; Grupo México, SA de CV; Elecnor, SA; Inversiones en Autotransportes Mexicanos, SA de CV; Siemens, SA de CV and Mitsui de México, S de RL de CV.

Some companies formed alliances before 15 July 2004 (the deadline indicated in the tender). From these alliances, the following consortia emerged:

- Consortium Alstom, made up of: Alstom Transporte, SA de CV (1.5%); Alstom Transport, SA (France) (11.0%); ICA-COI, SA de CV (Mexico) (12.5%); Grupo Hermes, SA de CV (Mexico) (50%); and Inverse, SA de CV (Mexico) (25.0%). System operators: RATP and/or Roggio.
- Consortium CAF, made up of: Construcciones y Auxiliar de Ferrocarriles, SA (Spain) (50.0%); Inversiones en Concesiones Ferroviarias, SA (Spain) (30%); Estrella Blanca, SA de CV (Mexico) (20%). System operator: Adif and/or Renfe.

The remaining companies withdrew their bids and, as a result, the CAF and Alstom consortia became the only finalists. On 28 June 2005, the Secretariat of Communications and Transportation announced the disqualification of the CAF consortium. The Secretariat argued that there were a series of technical uncertainties in the project presented by the Spanish consortium; moreover, the proposal had not been developed on the basis of the tender requirements. As a result, the Alstom consortium became the virtual winner of the tender. Luis Giralt, representative of CAF, challenged the disqualification, and on 4 July 2005 the Secretariat of Communications and Transportation decided to declare the tender void. The arguments for declaring the tender void were not specific. Only a technical fault (without details) in the Alstom proposal was mentioned.

On 12 July 2005, in the Official Gazette of the Federation, the Secretariat of Communications and Transportation published the new tender rules. Only the Alstom and CAF consortia responded. In this new bidding round, the Estrella Blanca group decided to leave the Spanish consortium. The Alstom consortium remained unchanged.

Given the irregularities presented in the first tender result, deputies from the Party of the Democratic Revolution demanded that the federal government make the suburban railway tender process transparent.

On 24 August 2005, the consortium Construcciones y Auxiliar de Ferrocarriles, S.A. (CAF) won a 30-year concession to supply materials, including rolling stock, build and operate System 1 of the Tren Suburbano. The trains used on this service are electric trains built by CAF and are similar to the series 2000 trains of the Companhia Paulista de Trens Metropolitanos of São Paulo, Brazil. CAF's economic proposal proved to be the lowest, charging, for long journeys, MXN $9.49 + VAT + inflation index and MXN $4.14 + VAT + inflation index for short journeys. Operation of System 1 would be handled by its subsidiary Ferrocarriles Suburbanos, SA de CV, and it would have 34 months to build the system.

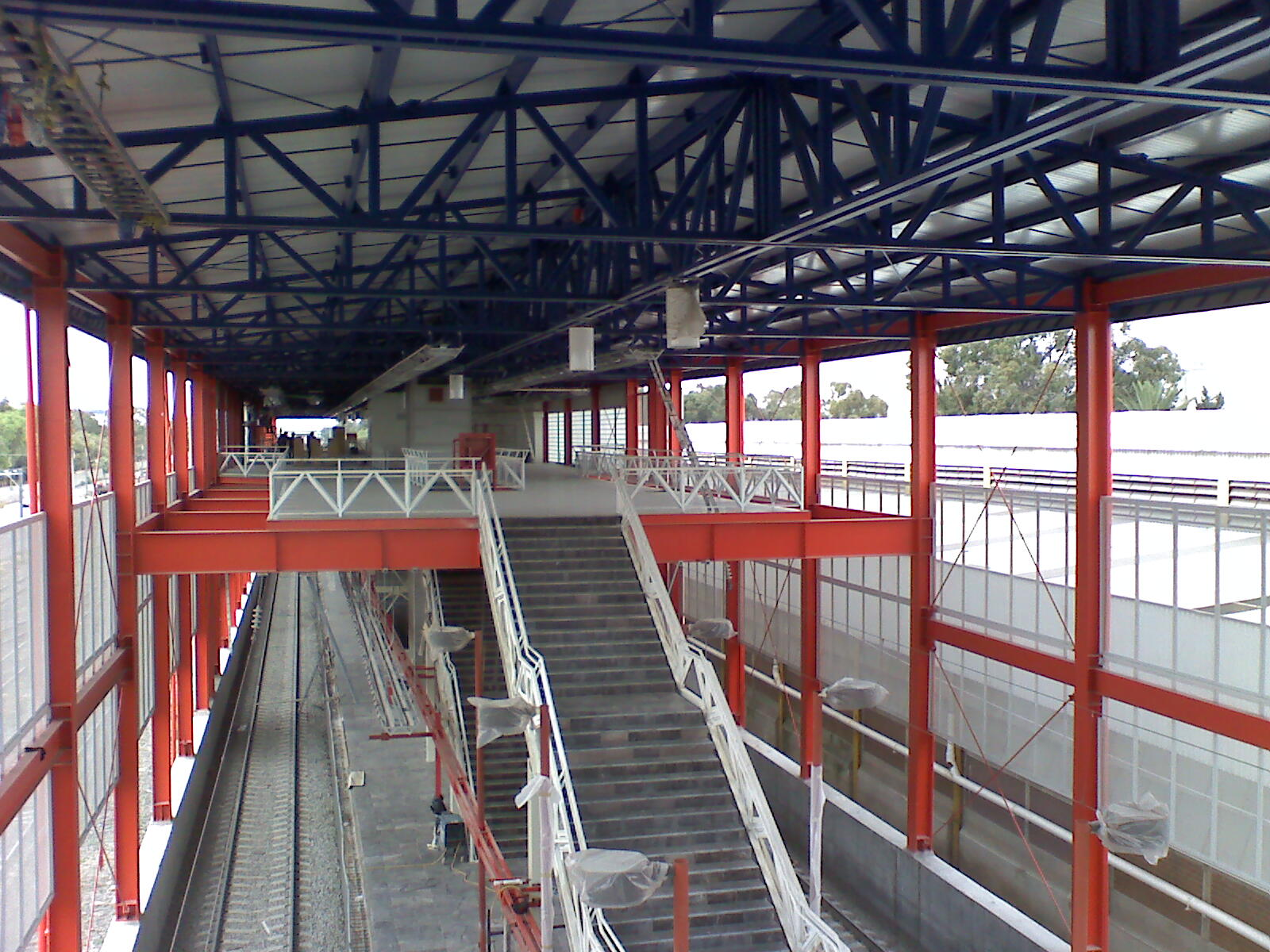
Interior of Fortuna station of System 1 during its construction (2 January 2008)

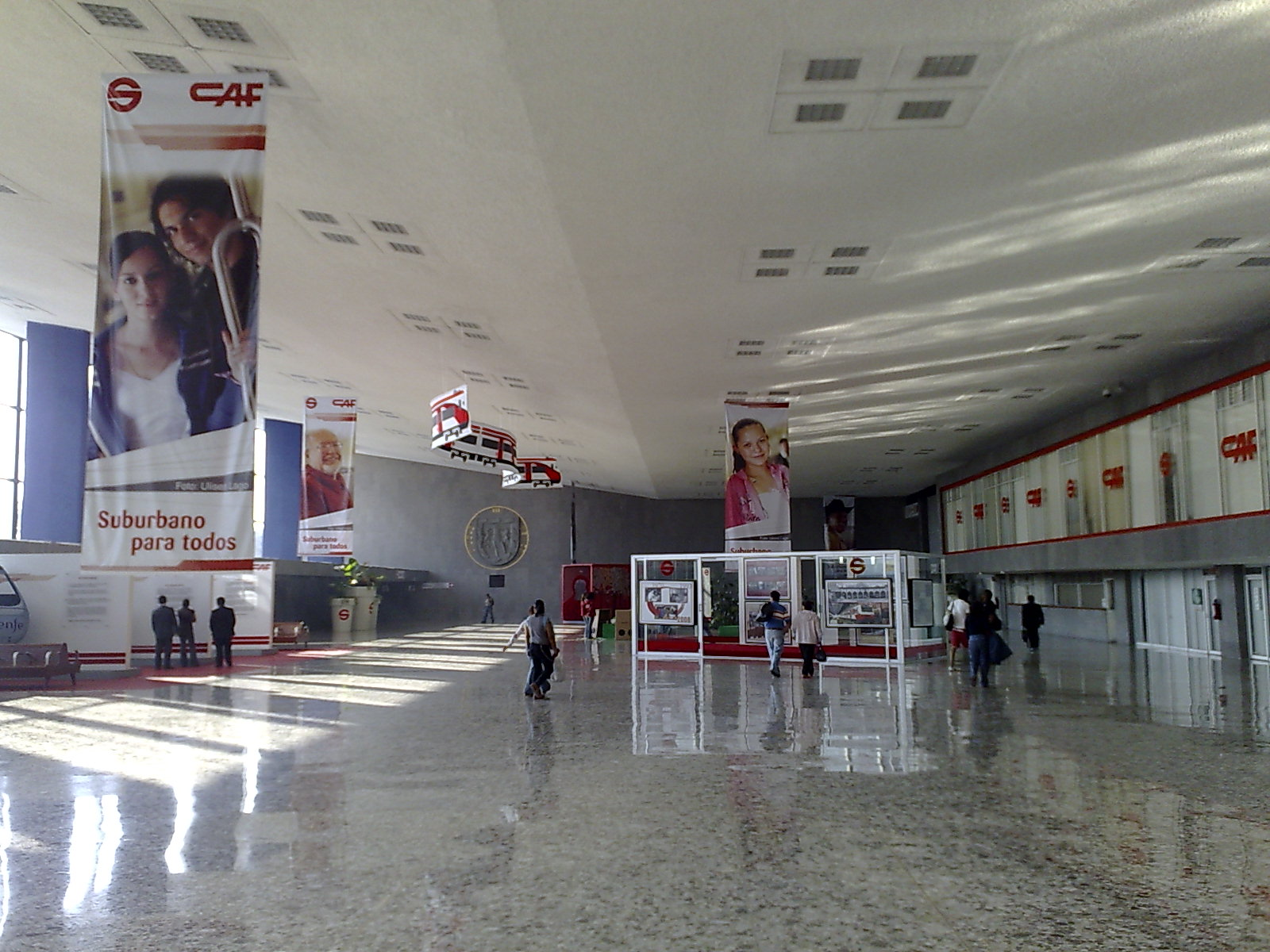
Interior of Buenavista station (18 December 2008)

After the long and controversial tender process for System 1, on 26 November 2007, Mexican journalist Jacobo Zabludovsky, in his column Bucareli in the newspaper El Universal, revealed the alleged intervention of King Juan Carlos of Spain and José Luis Rodríguez Zapatero in favor of the Spanish construction group. Despite this, no denial was issued by the parties involved.

With the suburban railway's inauguration approaching, authorities of the Federal District expressed dissatisfaction over delays in various complementary works (road and pedestrian bridges) and infrastructure to connect some suburban stations with other mass transport systems in Mexico City (Metrobús and the Mexico City Metro). The Secretariat of Communications and Transportation committed to deliver MXN$ 290 million to the Government of the Federal District, through an agreement signed on 2 May 2008, to carry out the corresponding mitigation works and acquire 12 buses for the Metrobús.

In December 2006, SCT announced that approval had been given for a route extending 19.3 kilometres (12.0 mi) from Jardines de Morelos to Martín Carrera; and another route running 12.8 km (8.0 mi) from Chalco to La Paz. Neither line was ever built.

The project aimed to reactivate the former railway system and improve the social well-being of residents of the Metropolitan Area of the Valley of Mexico through time savings in transport, reduction of traffic congestion, environmental pollution and excessive energy consumption. It also proposed to use the 242 kilometres of existing track in the area distributed among three trunk systems and lower-density lines, with potential grade separations similar to the ones done on the initial segment. The proposed trunk systems were Buenavista-Cuautitlán-Huehuetoca, Ecatepec-Naucalpan, and San Juan de Aragón-Los Reyes. The Secretariat of Communications and Transportation contracted the National Bank of Public Works and Services (BANOBRAS) as financial agent in order to structure financing, organise tenders, conduct feasibility studies, and develop the railway system. The financing structure designed allowed the participation of private capital.

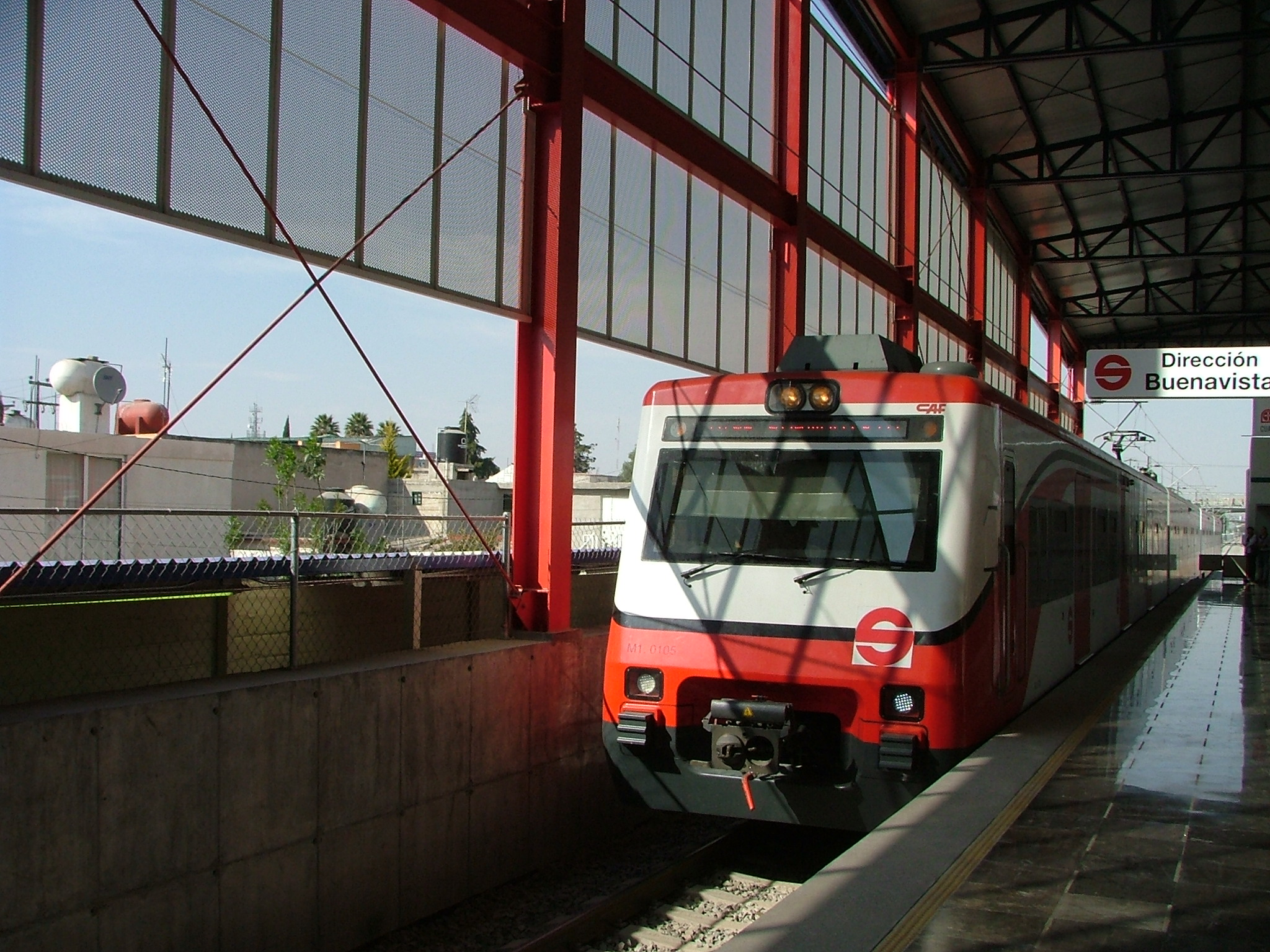
EMU in the platform area of Cuautitlán station (10 January 2009)

Line 1 covers a route measuring 27 kilometres (17 mi) from Mexico City's Buenavista Station to the State of Mexico's Cuautitlán. The section, which began commercial service on June 2, 2008 (after three weeks of fare-free trial operation), cost US$706 million to build, with the Mexican Federal Government contributing 55% of this investment. The inaugural demonstration trip of the service from Buenavista to Lechería Station and back again was made by then-President of Mexico, Felipe Calderón Hinojosa, and then-Governor of the State of Mexico (and eventual president of the country), Enrique Peña Nieto, with Calderón acting as the train's engineer.

Line 1 was built on an existing at-grade railroad right of way. However, inside Mexico City itself on the approach to Buenavista Station, a considerable amount of grade separation, including below-grade excavation and new bridges, was necessary due to high density and traffic congestion. The construction elicited complaints by Mexico City residents who objected to having their neighborhoods split by the rail line, but the public supported the project overall.

In addition to the track, the construction of Tren Suburbano also benefited from like-new electrification infrastructure already in place along most of the route, part of National Railways of Mexico (NdeM)'s Mexico City-Querétaro 25 kV 60 Hz mainline electrification completed in the 1990s but de-energized a few years later after NdeM was privatized.

== Corporate identity ==
The iconography and graphic system of System 1 were developed by Alejandro Sarabia Parra, a graduate of the Universidad Autónoma Metropolitana-Azcapotzalco, after winning first place in the Una vía para diseñar competition.

== Rolling stock ==
The rolling stock consists of trains known as EMU Cuautitlán-Buenavista, derived from the Renfe Class 447, with a track gauge of 1.435 m. The trains have a pantograph on the roof to receive the voltage of 25 kvolt AC supplied by means of a catenary.

There are three types of cars in the suburban railway: driving motor car with cab (M), motor car without cab (N) and trailer car (R). They can be coupled to form 3- and 4-car trains, MRM and MRNM, respectively. In turn, trains can be coupled together up to a maximum of three units, whether MRM or MRNM, in any combination.

Some significant characteristics of the trains are shown in the following table:

EMU Cuautitlán-Buenavista
Car type	M	N	R
Length (m)	25,900	25,485	25,485
Width (m)	3,009		
Floor height (m)	1,150		
Maximum speed (km/h)	130		
Service speed (km/h)	65		
Empty weight (kg)	47 700	46 900	46 500
Maximum capacity (seated passengers)	54	61	61
Maximum capacity (standing passengers)	271	293	364

== Service ==
Tren Suburbano leaving Buenavista station.

=== Ridership ===
Line 1 was projected to carry 100 million passengers annually. From June 1, 2008 to July 7, 2008, the service carried one million passengers, or an average of approximately 30,000 passengers per day. As of January 31, 2010 according to the head of Comercialización y Administración de Riesgos del Ferrocarril Suburbano stated that Line 1 of the Suburban Railway of the Mexico City Metropolitan Area served an average of 88,000 passengers per day. As of the end of 2012, ridership reached 132,000 per day, short of the 192,000 per day the private operator needed to stay solvent due to the high initial upfront cost and debt schedule. In 2012, the system ran an operational profit, but the profit was not high enough to cover accumulated debt repayment yet. Ridership had increased to 184,000 per day as of 2015. As of 2018, the Tren Suburbano had an average of 200,000 passengers per day. Due to the COVID-19 pandemic in Mexico, ridership decreased 73% as of May 2020.

Trains are scheduled every 6 minutes during peak hours.

=== Fare structure ===
As of 2024, the fares are 10.50 pesos (approximately US$0.57) for a trip of three or fewer stations and 24.50 pesos (approximately US$1.32) for longer trips of four or more stations. Fares are paid using a rechargeable card that costs 15.00 pesos.

=== Stations ===
Key (Note: The following list was adapted from different websites and official maps.: Metro connections obtained from the official Mexico City Metro system map.; Accessibility obtained from the Mexico City Metro system map. In some cases, the map omits the accessibility icon as the station(s) are actually partially accessible. However, the respective websites of each station on the official site indicate the respective accessibility methods. Stations with the symbol are fully accessible; stations with the symbol are partially accessible.; Cablebús obtained from their official website.; Centro de transferencia modal (CETRAM;) obtained from the official website of the Órgano Regulador de Transporte.; Ecobici obtained from their official website.; Metrobús obtained from the Mexico City Metrobús system map.; Mexibús obtained from the official Mexico City Metro system map.; Mexicable obtained from the official Mexico City Metro system map.; Public buses network (peseros) obtained from the official website of the Órgano Regulador de Transporte.; Red de Transporte de Pasajeros obtained from their official website.; Trolleybuses obtained from their official website.)
Handicapped/disabled access	Fully accessible station	Cablebús Line {{{3}}}	Cablebús connection	Red de Transporte de Pasajeros	RTP connection
Handicapped/disabled access	Partially accessible station	Mexibús	Mexibús connection	Tren Interurbano	Tren Interurbano connection
Transfer hub	CETRAM transfer station	Mexicable	Mexicable connection	Tren Suburbano	Tren Suburbano connection
Transfer hub	ETRAM transfer station	Mexico City Metro	Mexico City Metro connection	Trolleybus	Trolleybus connection
Ecobici	Ecobici bikeshare	Mexico City minubus	Pesero connection	Mexico City Light Rail	Mexico City Light Rail connection

No.	Station (Note: All the stations are fully accessible to people with disabilities.)	Date opened	Level	Distance (km)		Connections	Location	
No.	Station	Date opened	Level	Between stations	Total	Connections	Location	
01	Buenavista	2 June 2008	Grade level, overground access	-	0.0	(at Buenavista); Felipe Ángeles; 10E, 11C, 12B; (at distance)	Cuauhtémoc	Mexico City
02	Fortuna	2 June 2008	Grade level, overground and underground access	5.25	5.25	(at Ferrería/Arena Ciudad de México); Felipe Ángeles; 19, 19A, 107B	Azcapotzalco	Mexico City
03	Tlalnepantla	2 June 2008	Grade level, overground access	5.12	10.37	Felipe Ángeles	Tlalnepantla	State of Mexico
04	San Rafael	2 June 2008	Grade level, overground access	3.45	13.82	Felipe Ángeles	Tlalnepantla	State of Mexico
05	Lechería	2 June 2008	Grade level, overground access	4.22	18.04	Felipe Ángeles	Tultitlán	State of Mexico
06	Tultitlán	5 January 2009	Grade level, overground access	4.06	22.10		Tultitlán	State of Mexico
07	Cuautitlán	5 January 2009	Grade level, overground access	3.91	26.01		Cuautitlán	State of Mexico

=== Connection with other public transport systems ===
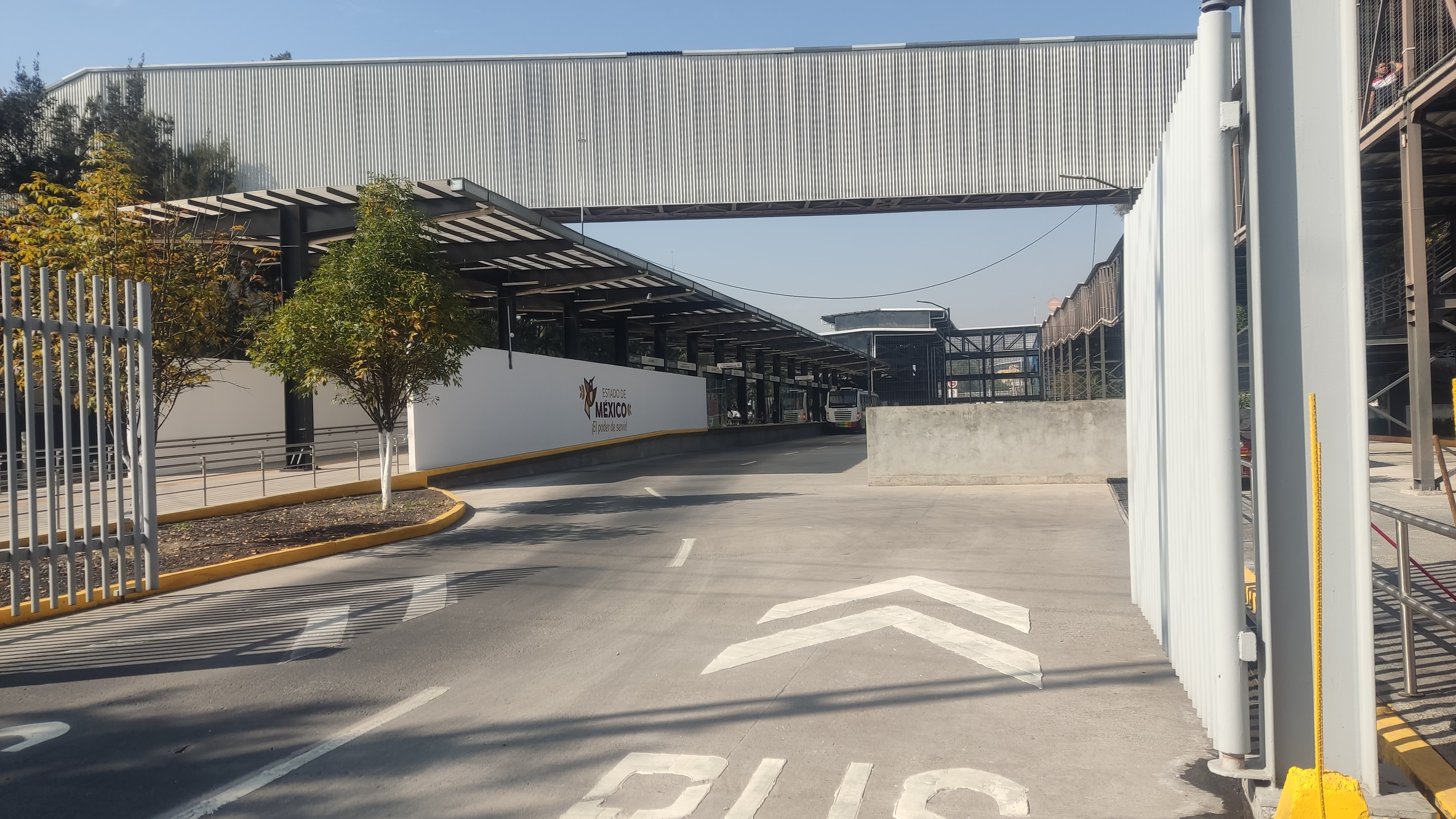
Estación Retorno Oriente of the Mexibús system connects directly to Lechería railway station

Some suburban railway stations connect with other public transport systems:

Each station has a Centro de transferencia modal (CETRAM) where users can board various passenger bus routes.

At Fortuna and Buenavista stations there is a connection with lines 6 and B of the Mexico City Metro, respectively. To board the metro it is necessary to buy a paper ticket or a smart card specific to that system.

At Lechería station there is a connection with line 2 of the Mexibus at the station of the same name. To use this transport it is necessary to purchase the system's own card.

Lines 1, 3 and 4 of the Metrobús service connect at Buenavista station. To access this service it is necessary to purchase a smart card called the Movilidad Integrada electronic card, which also allows entry to the Metro, RTP and Cablebús of Mexico City.

== Future ==
A second line was opened to connect with the Felipe Ángeles International Airport (AIFA) in Zumpango. Originally intended to be operated by Ferrocarriles Suburbanos, in 2025, the concession was waived to the Secretariat of National Defense. In April 2026, the government of Mexico announced the intention to purchase the concession of the Tren Suburbano from CAF.

== See also ==
- Buenavista metro station
- Buenavista railway station (old)
- Commuter rail in North America
- Ferrovalle
- List of suburban and commuter rail systems
- List of Mexican railroads
- Rail transport in Mexico
- El Insurgente
