= Felipe Ángeles (train) =

Greater Mexico City commuter rail line

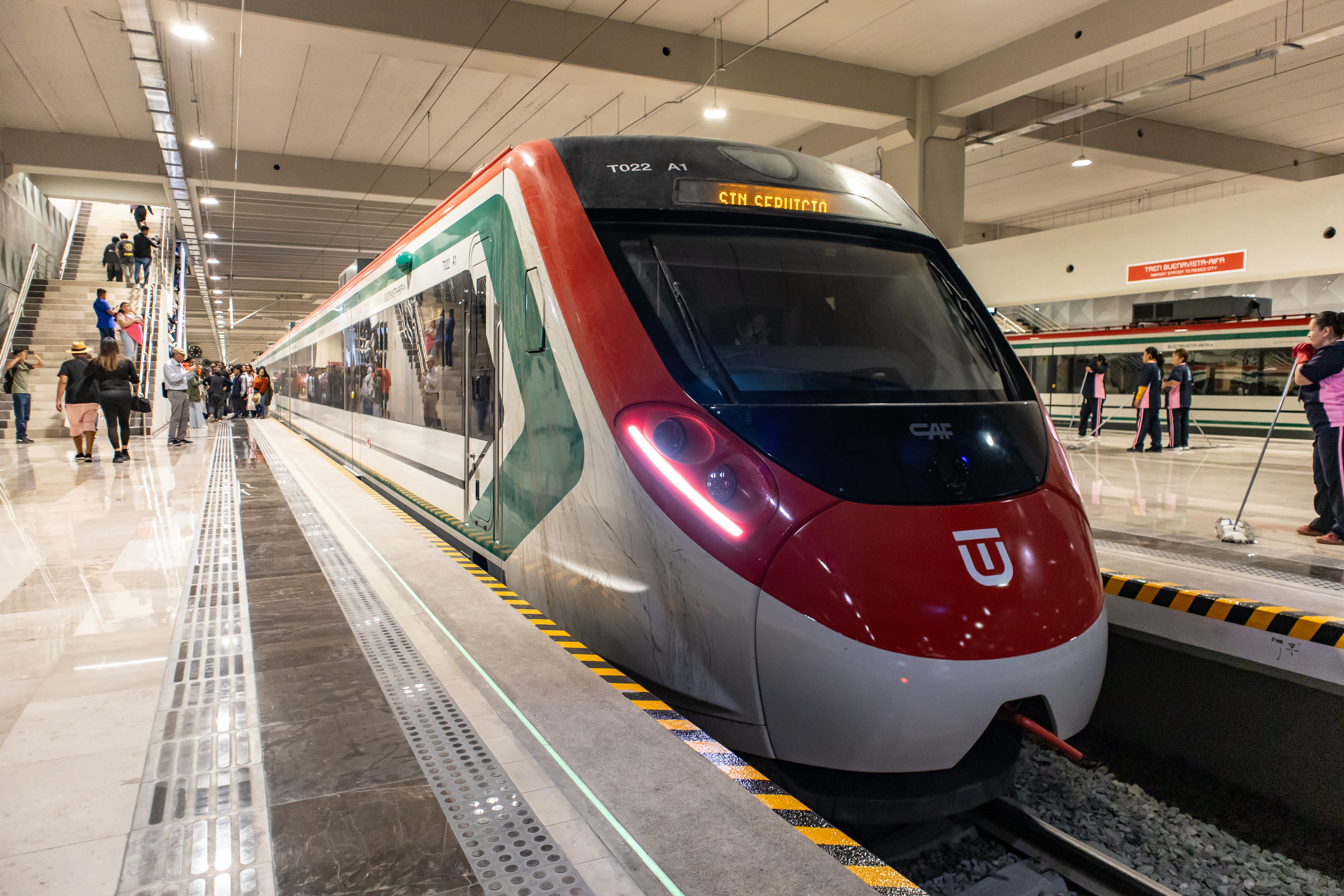
- Felipe Ángeles train arriving at AIFA–Clara Krause station

Overview
- Locale: Greater Mexico City
- Termini: Buenavista; AIFA–Clara Krause
- Stations: 12

Service
- Type: Commuter rail
- System: Tren Interurbano
- Operator: Banobras/Fonadin
- Rolling stock: CAF Civity-based EMUs

History
- Opened: 26 April 2026

Technical
- Track length: Current: 28 km (17 mi); Final: 52 km (32 mi)
- Num of tracks: 2
- Track gauge: 1,435 mm (4 ft 8 1/2 in) standard gauge
- Electrification: Overhead line, 25 kV 60 Hz AC
- Operating speed: 65 km/h (40 mph)

The Felipe Ángeles is a 28-kilometre (17 mi) commuter rail line connecting Mexico City and Felipe Ángeles International Airport (AIFA) in the State of Mexico. As part of the Tren Interurbano system, it is formally known as the Tren Interurbano Buenavista–AIFA. The line was inaugurated on 26 April 2026. It is planned to be extended north to Pachuca.

The line begins at Buenavista railway station in the borough of Cuauhtémoc in northern Mexico City and runs north, sharing infrastructure with the Tren Suburbano, before diverging after Lechería railway station and continuing northeast along a freight railway right-of-way to Felipe Ángeles International Airport. The route between Lechería and Felipe Ángeles International Airport includes eight stations along 28 kilometres (17 mi) of track through the municipalities of Tultitlán, Tultepec, Nextlalpan and Zumpango.

According to project estimates, the line is expected to serve 84,000-165,000 passengers per day and improve rail access to Felipe Ángeles International Airport from central Mexico City. During its first month of operation, the promotional fare was set at 45 pesos.

== History ==
On 19 March 2020, the project to build a branch line to the Felipe Ángeles International Airport, located in the municipality of Zumpango, was announced.

The construction of the branch line was expected to last about 24 months and would be a mixed investment of about 25 billion pesos, of which 15 billion would be from the concessionaires and the rest from the federal government.

The work would involve relocating 64,000 meters of main freight tracks, 3,500 meters of existing yards and 6,300 meters of secondary tracks, constructing a 13,400-meter switching yard, and building 28 kilometers of double track. This totals a 130-kilometer railway project, with the added complexity of working on existing tracks without interrupting freight service in the Valley of Mexico, especially to industries located along the railway line.

The branch line begins at the Lechería station and has six intermediate stations: Cueyamil, La Loma, Teyahualco, Prados Sur, Cajiga and Xaltocan; as well as the terminal station at the airport. It became operational on 26 April 2026.

=== Construction ===
In 2021, the concessionaire Ferrocarriles Suburbanos began construction in September of the branch line to the Felipe Ángeles International Airport (AIFA), which would depart from the Buenavista station, making the total journey approximately 38 to 40 minutes, and it was thought that it would begin service by the end of 2023.

The project was scheduled for completion in December 2023, but due to construction delays, the inauguration was postponed until April 2024. This was then postponed again to August 2024. After numerous delays, the project was transferred to SEDENA for completion.

On 21 December 2025, President Claudia Sheinbaum, Governor of the State of Mexico Delfina Gómez Álvarez, the head of the Railway Transport Regulatory Agency Andrés Lajous Loaeza, and the Director General of Banobras Jorge Mendoza Sánchez, made the first trip from Lechería to AIFA, beginning the testing period. The project will be operated by BANOBRAS.

=== Opening ===
On 26 April 2026, almost at the end of the inauguration of the Buenavista-AIFA section, the first phase of the Mexico City-Pachuca line, the president confirmed the name that had been announced in previous conferences:

A revolutionary general... Proudly from Hidalgo. This train that connects Mexico City, the State of Mexico, and the State of Hidalgo will, from today forward, bear the name of the Felipe Ángeles Train. (Note: Spanish: Un general revolucionario... Orgullosamente hidalguense. Este tren que conecta Ciudad de México, Estado de México y el Estado de Hidalgo, pues llevará el nombre, a partir de hoy, del Tren Felipe Ángeles.)

— Claudia Sheinbaum

== Stations ==
Key (Note: The following list was adapted from different websites and official maps.: Metro connections obtained from the official Mexico City Metro system map.; Accessibility obtained from the Mexico City Metro system map. In some cases, the map omits the accessibility icon as the station(s) are actually partially accessible. However, the respective websites of each station on the official site indicate the respective accessibility methods. Stations with the symbol are fully accessible; stations with the symbol are partially accessible.; Cablebús obtained from their official website.; Centro de transferencia modal (CETRAM;) obtained from the official website of the Órgano Regulador de Transporte.; Ecobici obtained from their official website.; Metrobús obtained from the Mexico City Metrobús system map.; Mexibús obtained from the official Mexico City Metro system map.; Mexicable obtained from the official Mexico City Metro system map.; Public buses network (peseros) obtained from the official website of the Órgano Regulador de Transporte.; Red de Transporte de Pasajeros obtained from their official website.; Trolleybuses obtained from their official website.)
Handicapped/disabled access	Fully accessible station	Cablebús Line {{{3}}}	Cablebús connection	Red de Transporte de Pasajeros	RTP connection
Handicapped/disabled access	Partially accessible station	Mexibús	Mexibús connection	Tren Interurbano	Tren Interurbano connection
Transfer hub	CETRAM transfer station	Mexicable	Mexicable connection	Tren Suburbano	Tren Suburbano connection
Transfer hub	ETRAM transfer station	Mexico City Metro	Mexico City Metro connection	Trolleybus	Trolleybus connection
Ecobici	Ecobici bikeshare	Mexico City minubus	Pesero connection	Mexico City Light Rail	Mexico City Light Rail connection

The stations on the line are the following:

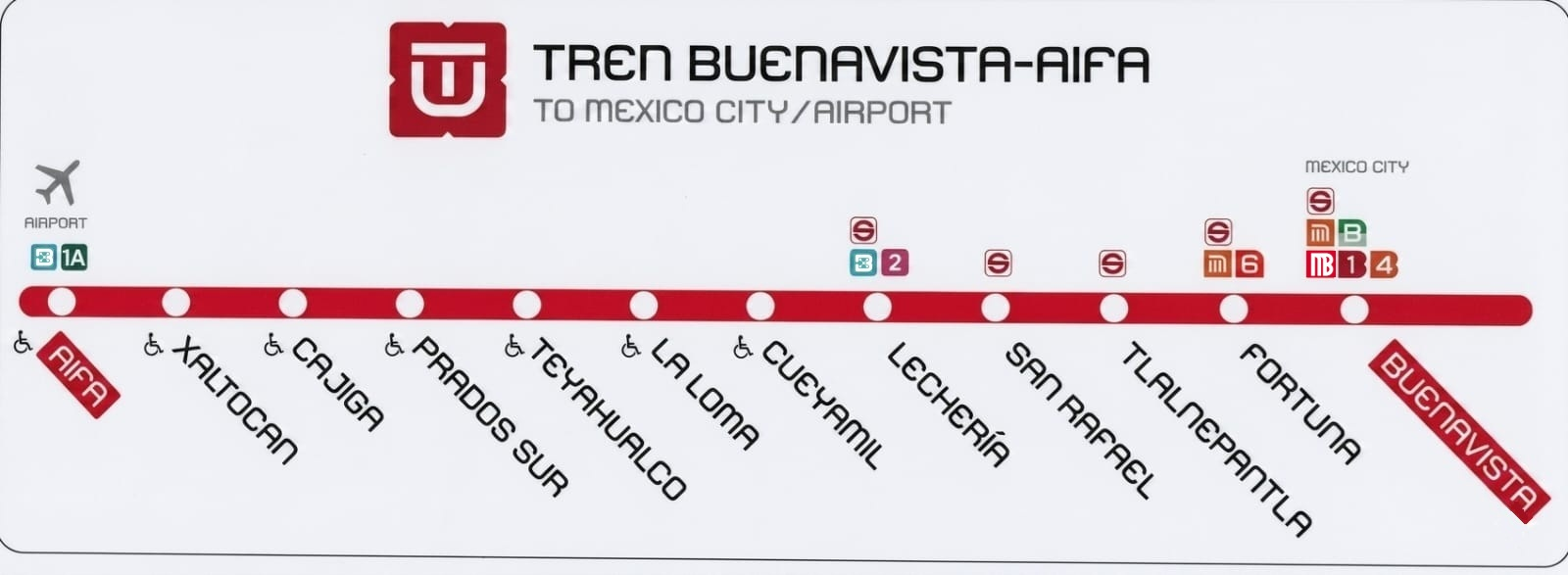
Stations in 2026.

No.	Station	Level	Connection	Location
Toward Lechería railway station (shared with the Tren Suburbano system)
01	Cueyamil	Grade level, overground access		Tultitlán
02	La Loma	Grade level, overground access		Tultitlán
03	Teyahualco	Grade level, overground access		Tultepec
04	Prados Sur	Grade level, overground access		Tultitlán
05	Cajiga	Grade level, overground access		Tultitlán
06	Xaltocan	Grade level, overground access	Xaltocan	Nextlalpan
07	AIFA–Clara Krause	Underground, grade level access	Felipe Ángeles International Airport; (at Terminal de Pasajeros)	Zumpango

== Rates and schedules ==
The Buenavista–AIFA Train operates with the following fares and service hours:

=== Rates ===
- Trip Buenavista - Xaltocan and vice versa: $11.50 (Eleven pesos 50/100 MN) (From April 27, 2026 to May 27, this will be the promotional fare, afterwards it will change and the prices are not yet known).
- Boarding and disembarking at AIFA / Clara Krause: Promotional month $45.00 (Forty-five pesos 00/100 MN)

=== Schedules ===
- Monday to Friday: from 5:00 to 00:00 hours.
- Saturdays: from 6:00 AM to 12:00 AM (midnight).
- Sundays and public holidays: from 7:00 a.m. to 00:00 a.m.

=== Details ===
Terminal	Time	Monday to Friday	Saturdays	Sundays and holidays
Buenavista	First departure	04:57	06:05	07:05
Buenavista	Last departure	00:11	00:13	00:05
Buenavista	First arrival	?	?	?
Buenavista	Last arrival	00:51	00:55	00:46
AIFA / Clara Krause	First departure	05:00	06:07	07:01
AIFA / Clara Krause	Last departure	00:01	00:07	1:00
AIFA / Clara Krause	First arrival	?	?	?
AIFA / Clara Krause	Last arrival	00:51	00:49	00:51

== Rolling stock ==
Ten Civity-type trains, of the same model as the trains from El Insurgente, will run along this branch line. These units can travel at 130 kilometers per hour, although due to their proximity to the Tren Suburbano, the speed will be 65 kilometers per hour. They have a capacity of 750 passengers and are equipped with various security measures, including surveillance cameras.

== See also ==
- Transportation in Mexico City
- El Insurgente
- Tren Suburbano
