= Cuautitlán railway station =

Cuautitlán
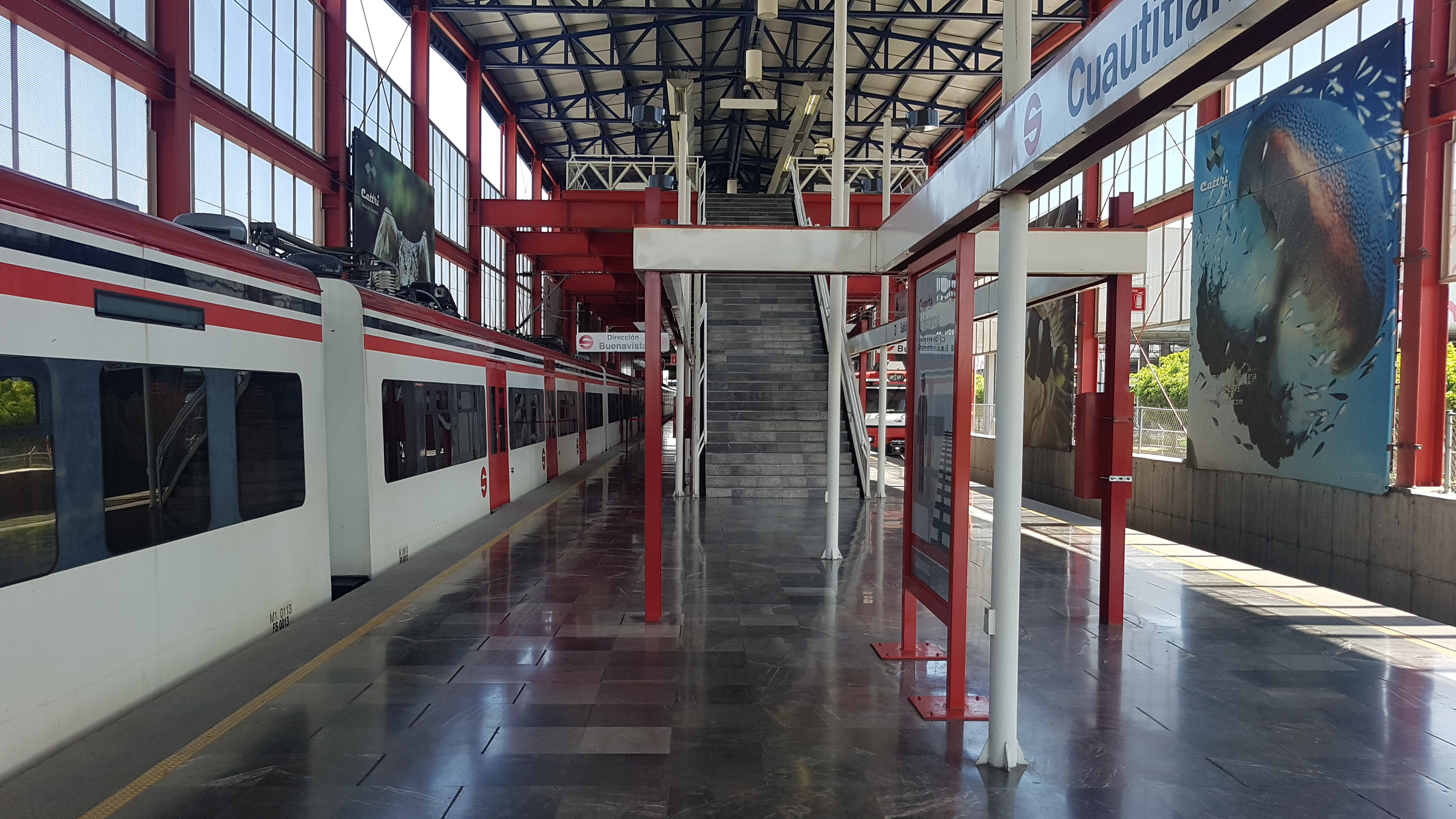

General information
- Location: Cuautitlán, State of Mexico; Mexico
- Coordinates: 19.66637°N 99.17640°W
- System: Commuter rail
- Owner: Ferrocarriles Suburbanos
- Operator: Ferrocarriles Suburbanos
- Platforms: 1 island platform
- Tracks: 2
- Connections: ETRAM Cuautitlán

Construction
- Structure type: At grade
- Cycle facilities: Bicycle parking-only
- Accessible: yes

History
- Opened: 5 January 2009; 17 years ago

Services
Preceding station	Tren Suburbano	Following station
Tultitlán toward Buenavista	Line 1	Terminus
Route map
Location
- Location within Greater Mexico City
- Area map and layout

Cuautitlán is a commuter railway station serving the Ferrocarril Suburbano, a suburban rail that connects the State of Mexico with Mexico City. The station is located in the municipality of Cuautitlán, State of Mexico, north of Mexico City.

== General information ==
Cuautitlán station is located in the Paseos de Cuautitlán neighborhood in Cuautitlán and it is the seventh and last station of the system going northbound from Buenavista.

== History ==
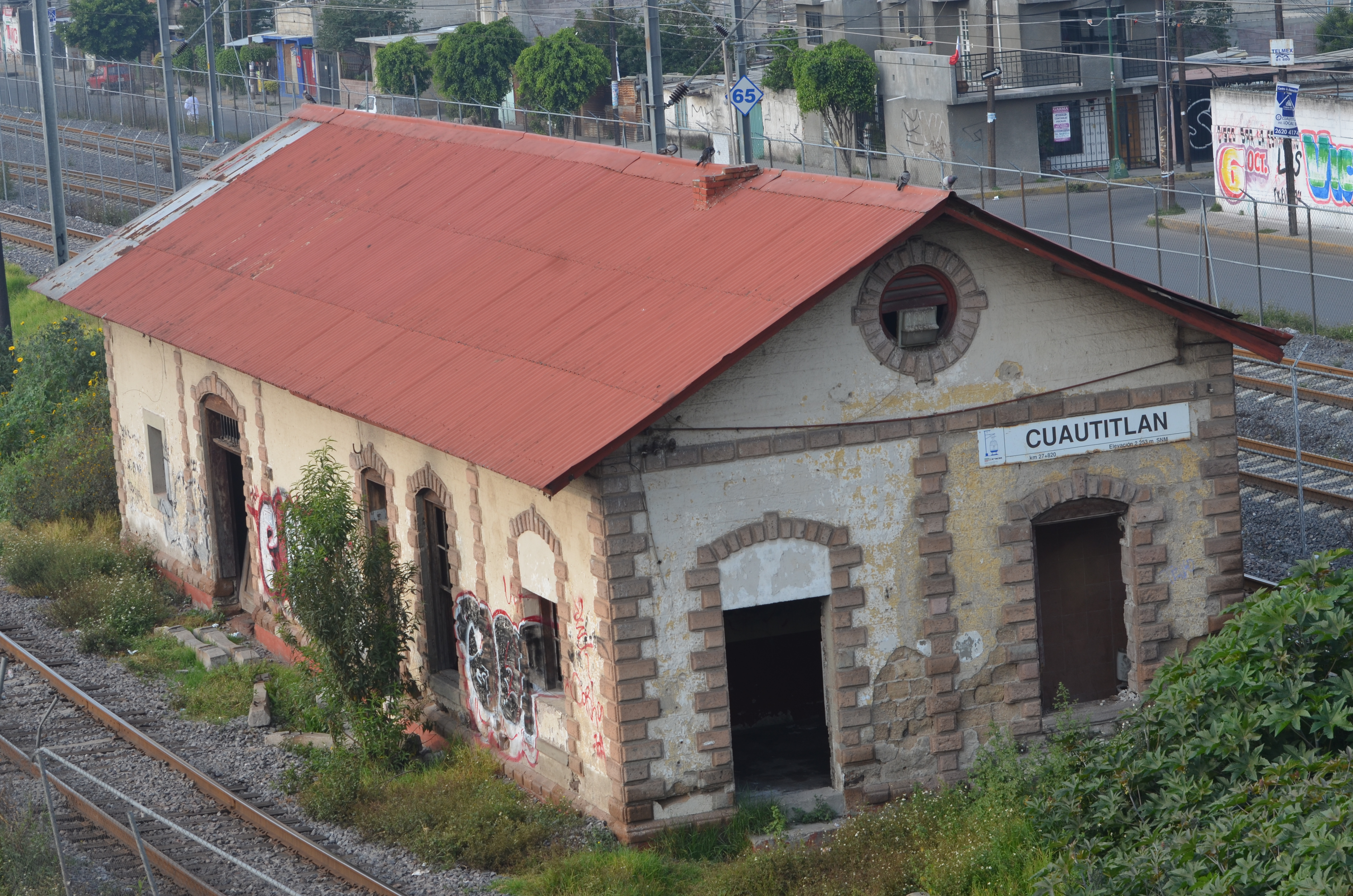
The old Cuautitlán station in 2012

The old Cuautitlán railway station was built around 1880; the new station was built 100 meters (330 ft) away from the old one. Cuautitlán station was opened on 5 January 2009 as part of the second stretch of system 1 of the Ferrocarril Suburbano, going towards Buenavista Station in Mexico City. On 1 April 2019, seven people robbed the station's ticket office.

== Station layout ==
G	Street Level	Exits/Entrances
G Platforms	Northbound	Terminus
G Platforms	Island platform, doors will open on the left
G Platforms	Southbound	toward Buenavista (Tultitlán)→
