= Buenavista railway station =

Commuter rail terminus in Mexico City

Buenavista
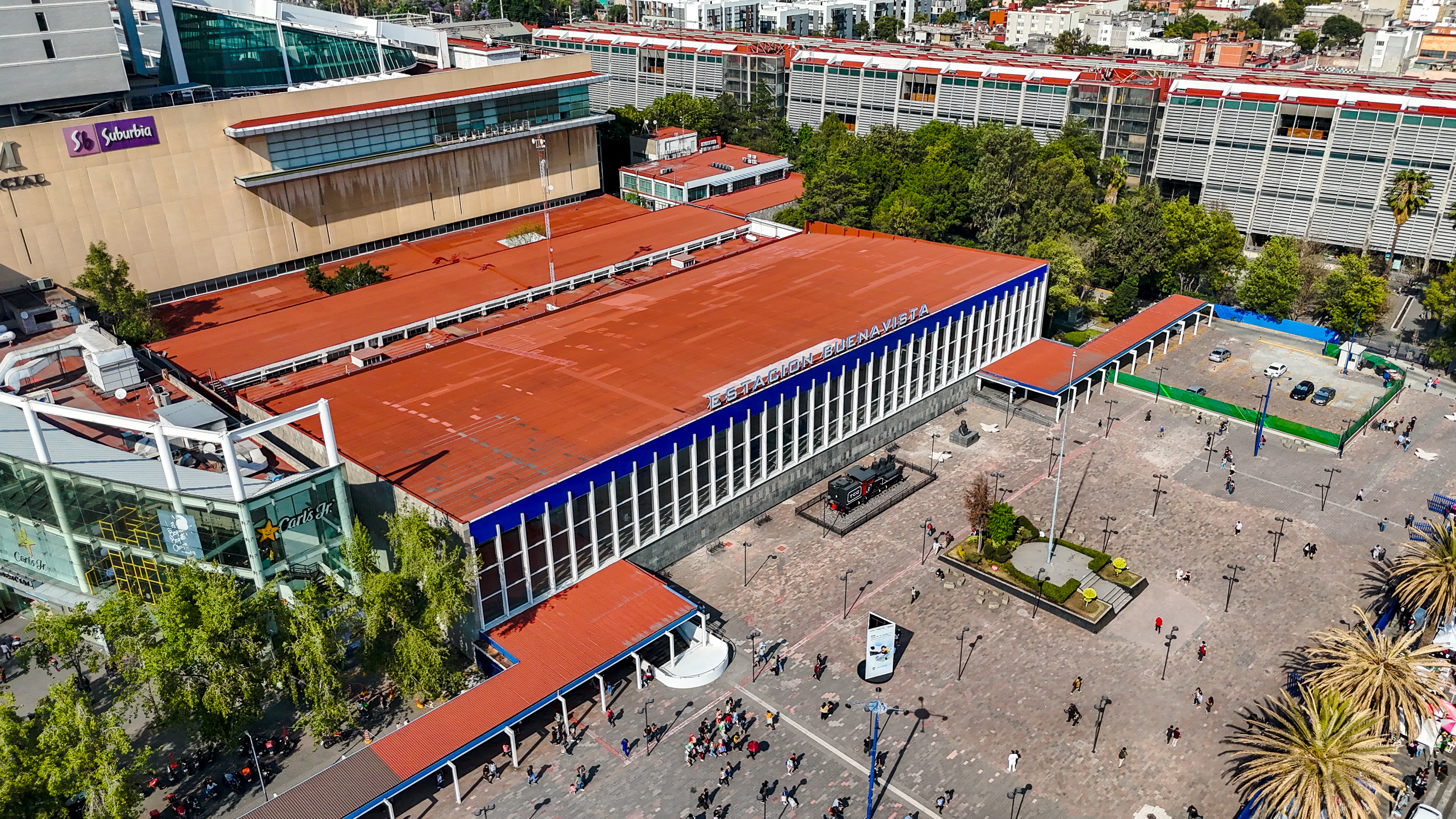
- Buenavista Station in 2025

General information
- Location: Cuauhtémoc, Mexico City
- Coordinates: 19.4478°N 99.1522°W
- System: Commuter rail
- Owner: Ferrocarril Suburbano (2008–present)
- Line: Line 1
- Platforms: 4 island platforms
- Tracks: 5
- Connections: CETRAM Buenavista; at Buenavista; Public buses

Construction
- Structure type: At-grade
- Parking: Yes (Forum Buenavista)
- Cycle facilities: Yes
- Accessible: Yes

History
- Opened: June 2, 2008

Services
Preceding station	Tren Suburbano	Following station
Terminus	Line 1	Fortuna toward Cuautitlán
Preceding station	Tren Interurbano	Following station
Terminus	Felipe Ángeles	Fortuna toward AIFA–Clara Krause
Route map
Location
- Location within Mexico City
- Area map and layout

Buenavista is a commuter railway station in Mexico City. The station provided intercity train services from Ferrocarriles Nacionales de México. Since June 2008, the station serves as the terminus of the Tren Suburbano commuter rail service, and since April 2026, the Felipe Ángeles service. Atop the ground-level station and tracks is one of the city's largest shopping malls, Forum Buenavista.

The adjacent Buenavista metro station is also the terminus of Mexico City Metro Line B, that runs from this station to Ciudad Azteca in the State of Mexico. Additionally, three Metrobús lines serve the area.

== History ==
Originally, the station was owned by Ferrocarriles Nacionales de México (N de M), but after the company was privatized, the station was closed. Ferrocarriles Suburbanos acquired the station and was remodeled beginning in 2007 in preparation for the launch of commuter rail service to Cuautitlán Izcalli in the State of Mexico.

In 2012 a large enclosed shopping mall was opened on three floors topping the ground-level station and tracks, Forum Buenavista, anchored by a Cinépolis multiplex cinema and a Sears.

In addition to being a terminus of Metro Line B, the railway station is also a stop for three Metrobús lines, Mexico City's bus rapid transit system.

== Gallery ==
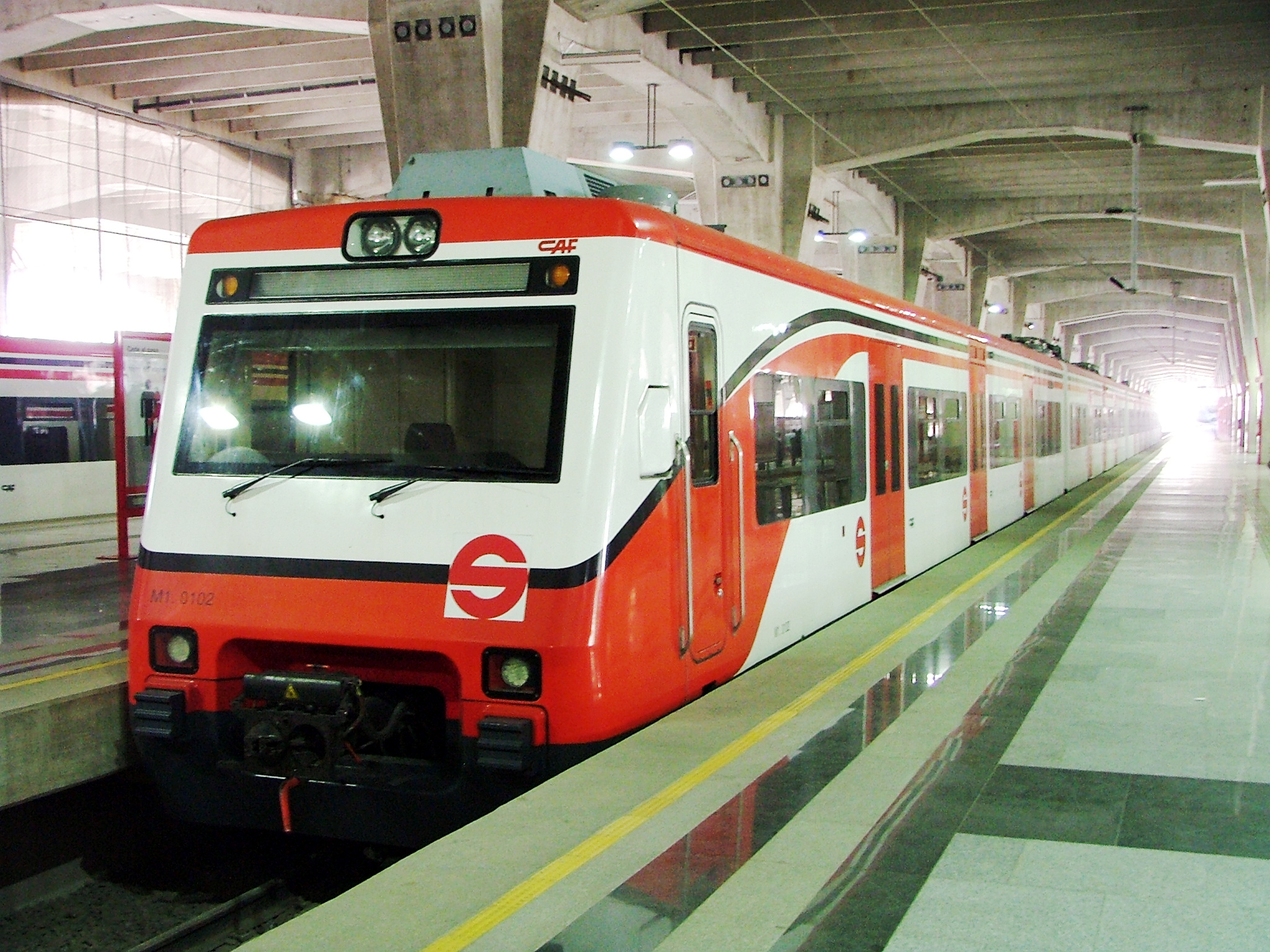
A CAF EMU UT-447 train at the platforms

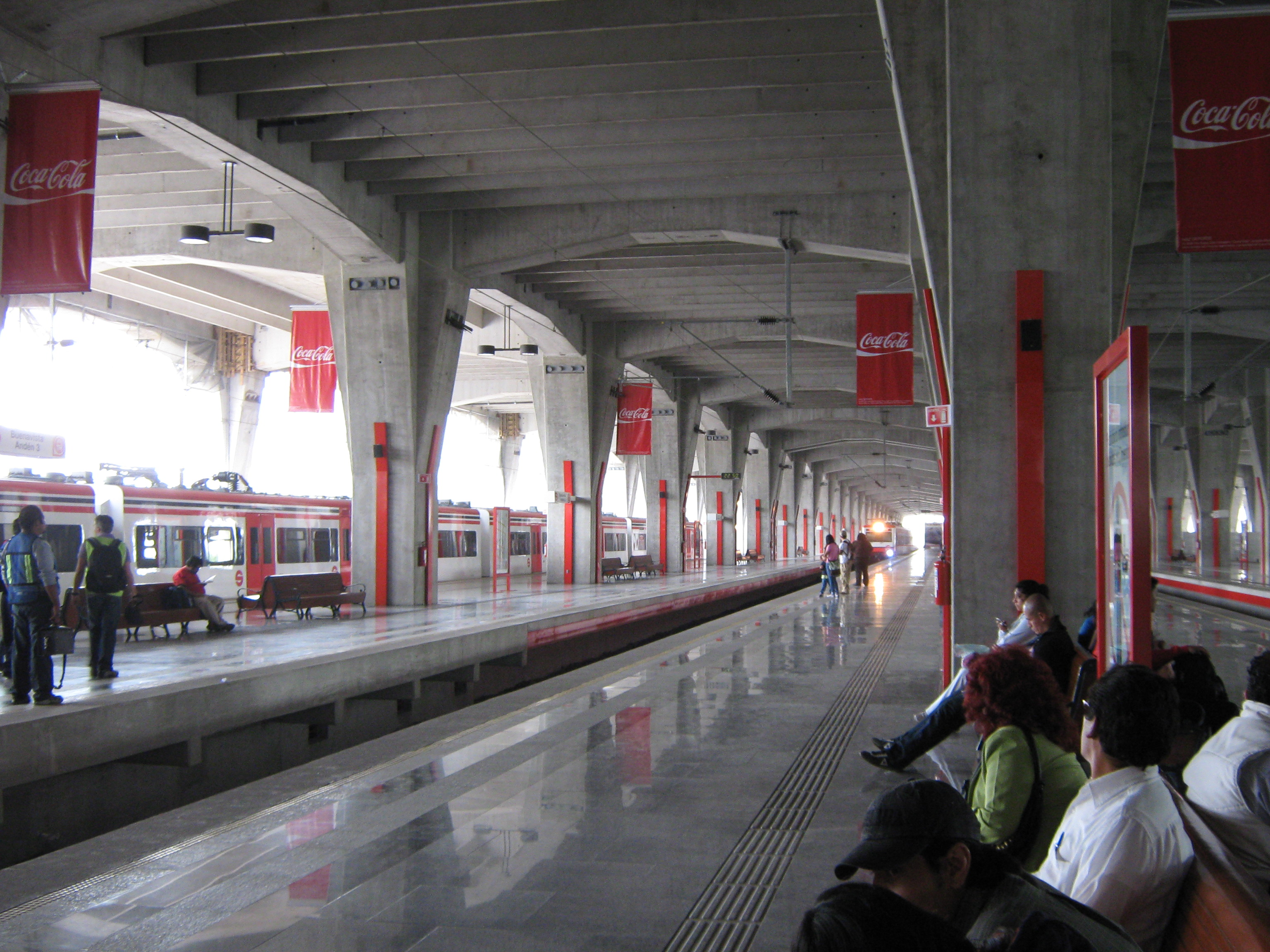
Platforms

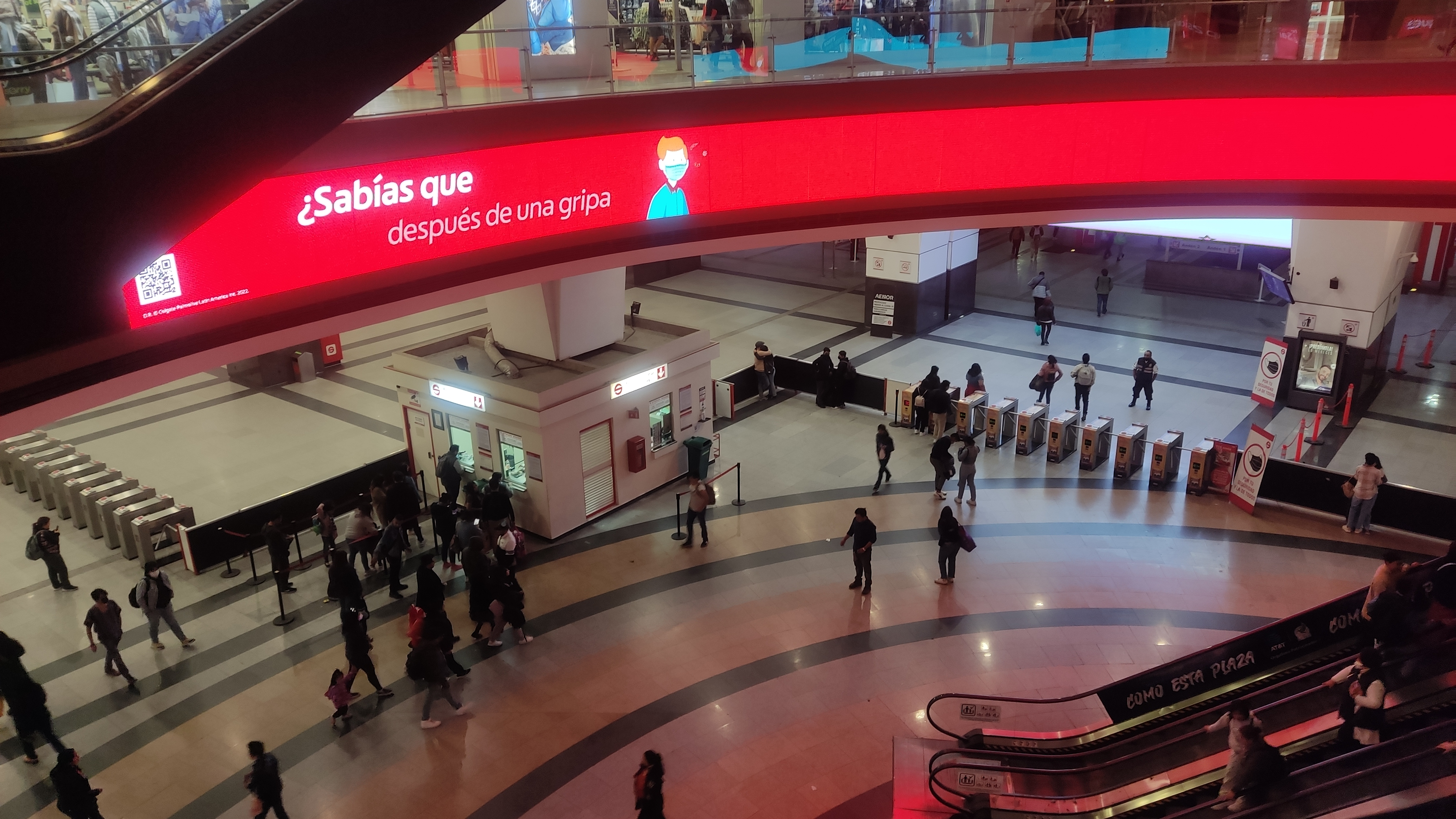
Forum Buenavista's main access and the station's access zone

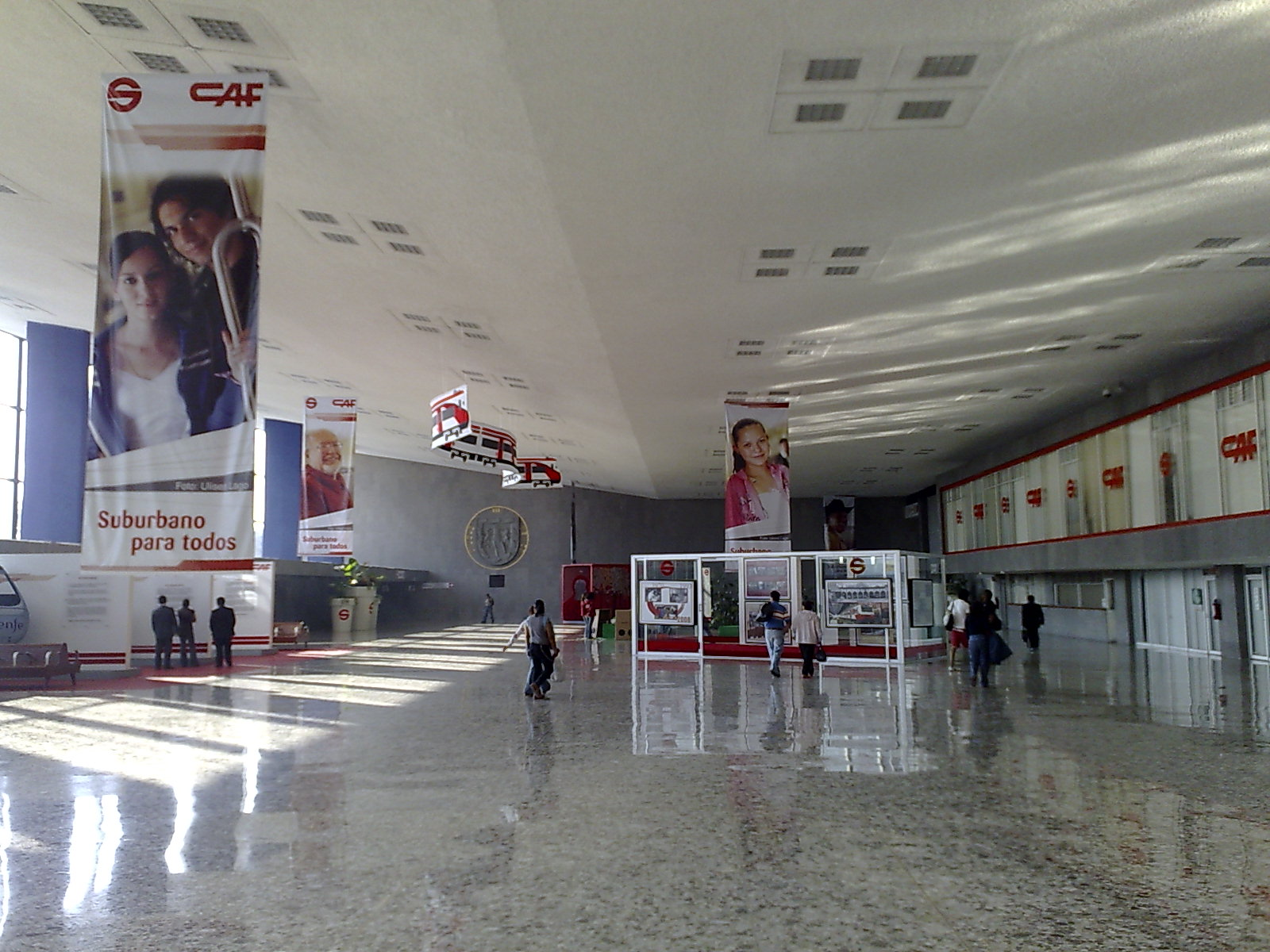
Southern lobby

Suburban Train leaving Buenavista station
