= Tren Interurbano =

Inter-city rail services in Mexico

The official logo

Tren Interurbano (English: Interurban Train) is an umbrella term for inter-city rail services in Mexico operated by the Agencia de Trenes y Transporte Público Integrado (ATTRAPI).

== El Insurgente ==
The Tren Interurbano project started with El Insurgente (Tren Interurbano Mexico City–Toluca). It runs from Zinacantepec railway station, in Toluca, State of Mexico, to Observatorio, in western Mexico City. Its service began in 2023 and it is operated by the government of Mexico.

== Felipe Ángeles ==
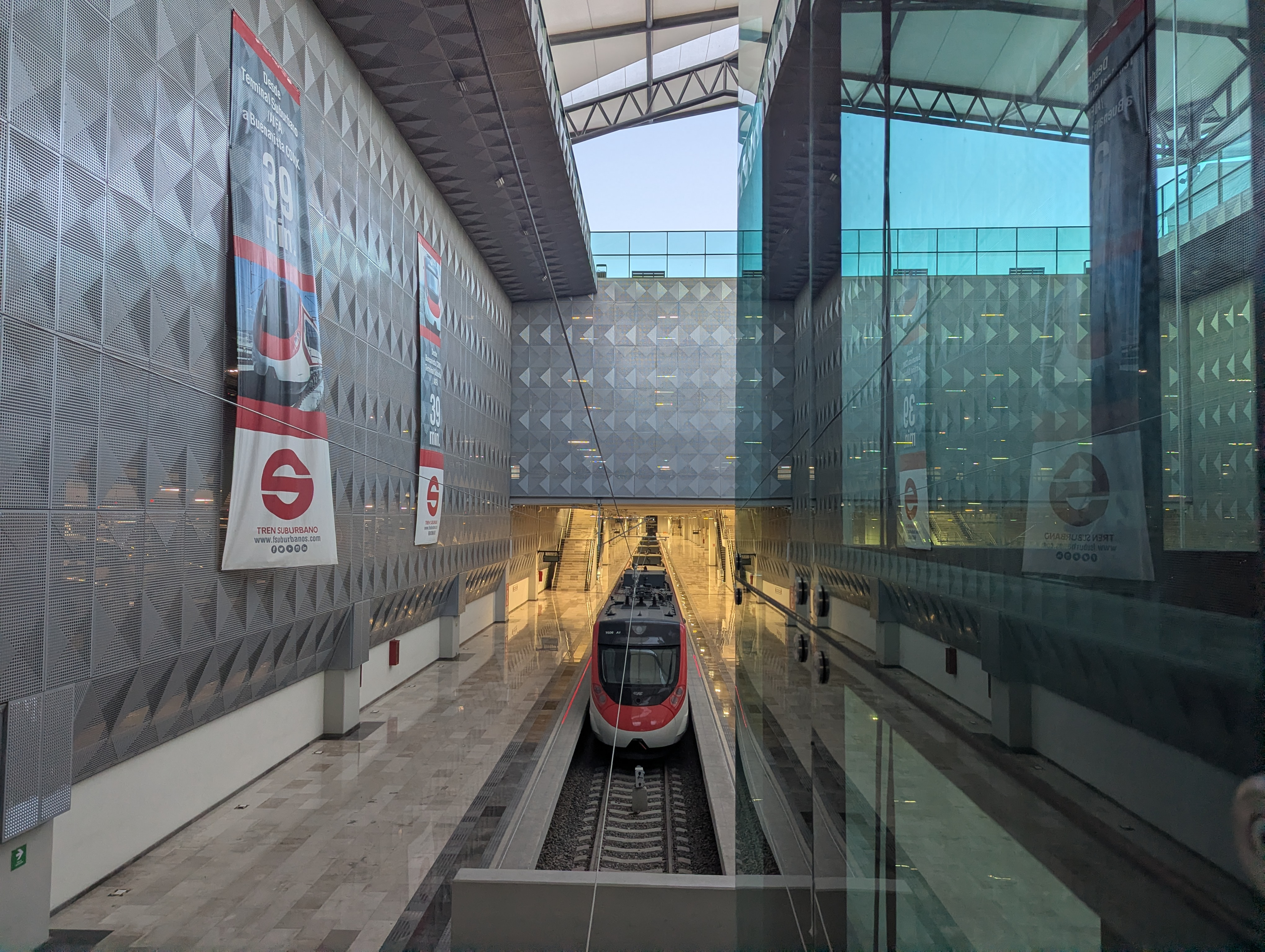
Train at AIFA station.

A second line was named the Felipe Ángeles and it runs from Buenavista railway station towards Felipe Ángeles International Airport, at the AIFA–Clara Krause railway station. It opened on 26 April 2026.

The branch route formerly belonging to the Tren Suburbano toward the Felipe Ángeles International Airport (AIFA) in Zumpango was inaugurated in 2026 after delays in construction. The line follows the route of a previously proposed branch from Lechería to Jaltocan, and it passes through the municipalities of Tultitlán, Tultepec, Nextlalpan and Zumpango.

On April 26, 2026, the line Buenavista–AIFA was inaugurated and began operations in the afternoon.

== Future ==
In 2025, the operators announced a third line, which will run from Buenavista railway station, in Central Mexico City, to Pachuca, Hidalgo, connecting the AIFA. Additional lines were proposed to run from Buenavista railway station to Queretaro City, Querétaro, Guadalajara, Jalisco, Monterrey, Nuevo León, and Nogales, Sonora.

=== Felipe Ángeles International Airport–Pachuca ===
On 8 October 2024, the president of Mexico, Claudia Sheinbaum Pardo, led the start of preliminary works for the construction of the Mexico City–Pachuca railway in Tizayuca, Hidalgo. This project will connect the state of Hidalgo with the Metropolitan Area of the Valley of Mexico. Specifically, this section of the railway will connect with the station located at Felipe Ángeles International Airport (AIFA) and will have a length of 64 kilometres for an estimated investment of 44,367 million Mexican pesos. It is expected to benefit 100,000 residents and reduce travel time between Felipe Ángeles International Airport and Pachuca to 25 minutes. In addition, 3.5% of the budget will be allocated to environmental restoration in the area. The railway will use electric trains and is expected to begin operations in the first quarter of 2027.
