= AIFA–Clara Krause railway station =

Train station in Zumpango, State of Mexico

AIFA / Clara Krause
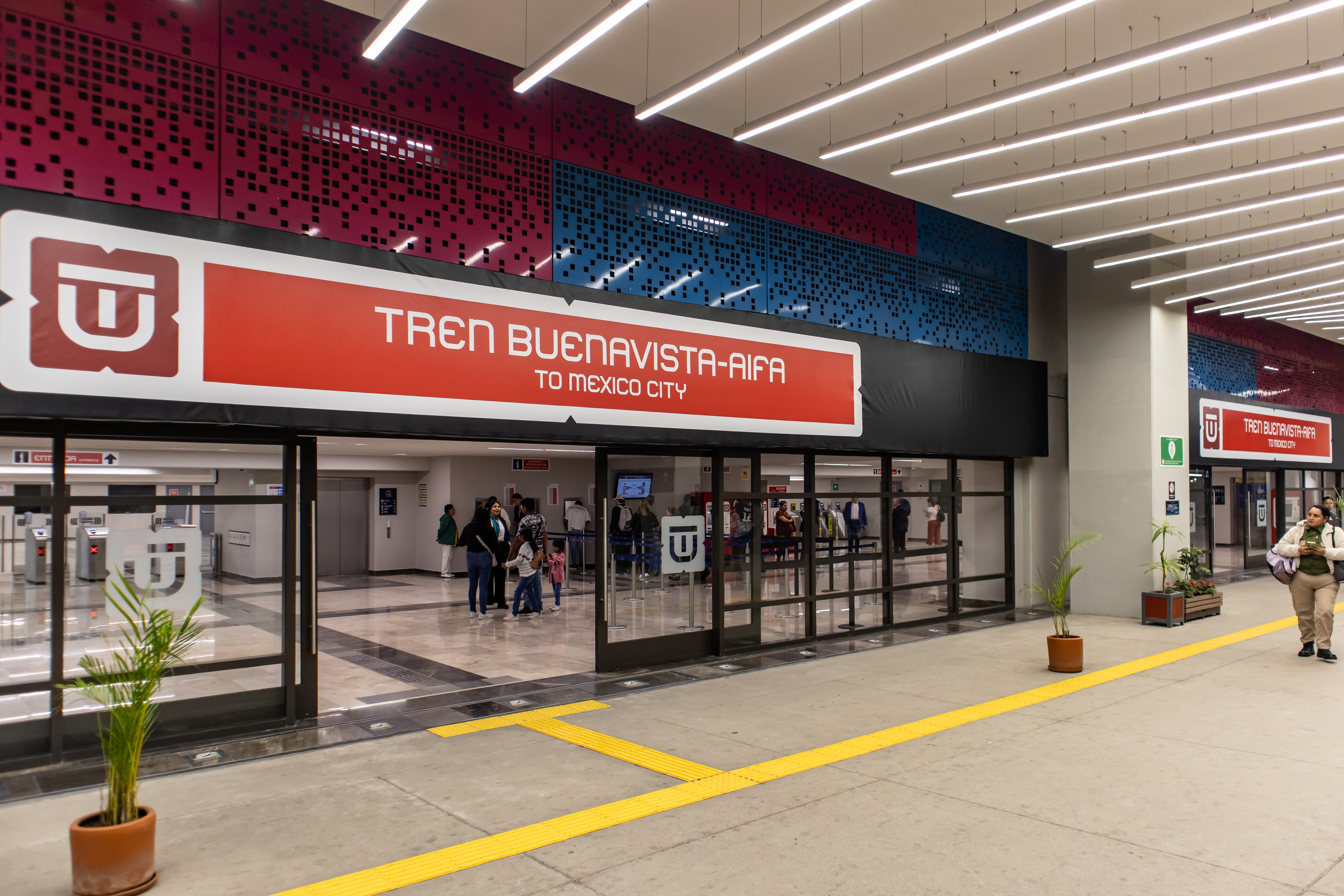

General information
- Location: Zumpango, State of Mexico; Mexico
- Coordinates: 19.7354°N 99.0262°W
- System: Commuter rail
- Owner: Federal government of Mexico
- Operator: Secretariat of National Defense
- Platforms: 3
- Tracks: 3
- Connections: Felipe Ángeles International Airport; Terminal de Pasajeros

Construction
- Structure type: Underground
- Accessible: Yes

Other information
- Status: In service

History
- Opened: 26 April 2026; 6 months ago

Services
Preceding station	Tren Interurbano	Following station
Xaltocan toward Buenavista	Felipe Ángeles	Terminus
Route map
Location
- Area map and layout

Clara Krause Sánchez, the station's namesake, in 1919

The AIFA / Clara Krause railway station is the northern terminus of a branch of the Felipe Ángeles train. It is located in the Municipality of Zumpango, State of Mexico. On 26 April 2026, the station was inaugurated and began operations in the afternoon. Clara Krause Sánchez (1876–1919) was the wife of General Felipe Ángeles.

== History ==
Formerly called AIFA, the construction faced multiple delays, and the opening date has been pushed from 2022, to July 2025, and finally April 2026.

== Overview ==
The terminal is housed in the basement of the user parking building. It provides service to passengers and employees of Felipe Ángeles International Airport (AIFA), transporting them between Mexico City and the State of Mexico.

The station covers an area of almost 12,000 square meters, and it will have elevators, escalators, service stairs, and closed circuit television and equipment.

== Connections ==
The terminal is connected to Line I of the Mexibús.

Furthermore, to connect the station with Line IV, an extension is planned from the Universidad Mexiquense terminal to AIFA, thus connecting from La Raza in Mexico City to the airport. It is expected to use the new road on the way to Tonanitla, which has not yet been delivered.

== Places of interest ==
- Mammoth central, the Paleontological Museum of Santa Lucía Quinametzin
- Mexican Air Force Museum
- Historic-Cultural Train Museum (Museo Tren Histórico Cultural)

== Gallery ==
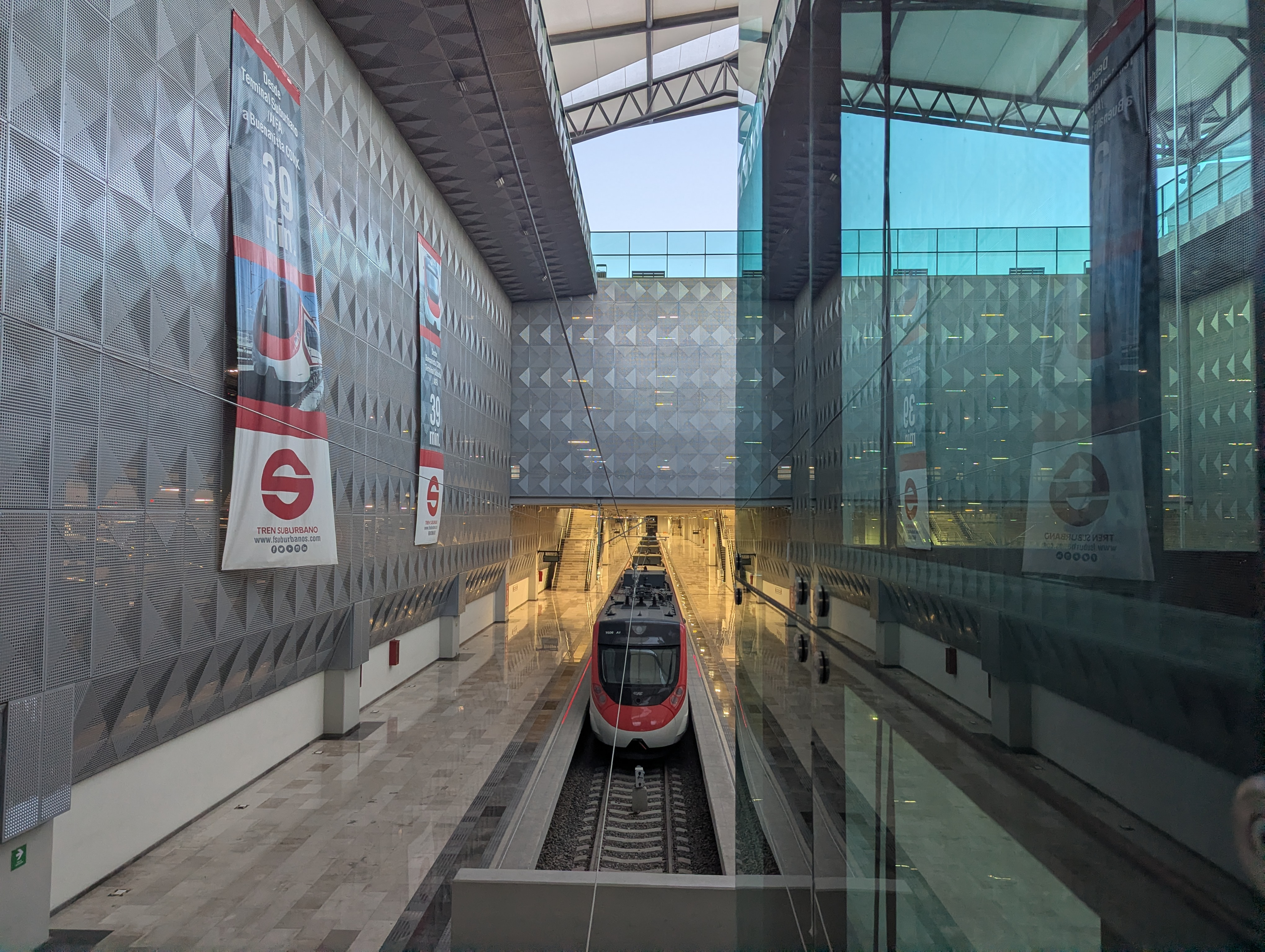
A train at the station before opening, December 2025

Train arriving on the first day of service

Train at the platform

Platforms

Platform level

Escalators to the platforms

Lobby

Turnstiles

Card-reloading machines

Line at the ticket window on the first day of service

== See also ==
- Felipe Ángeles International Airport
