= Norte 45 metro station =

Mexico City Metro station

Norte 45
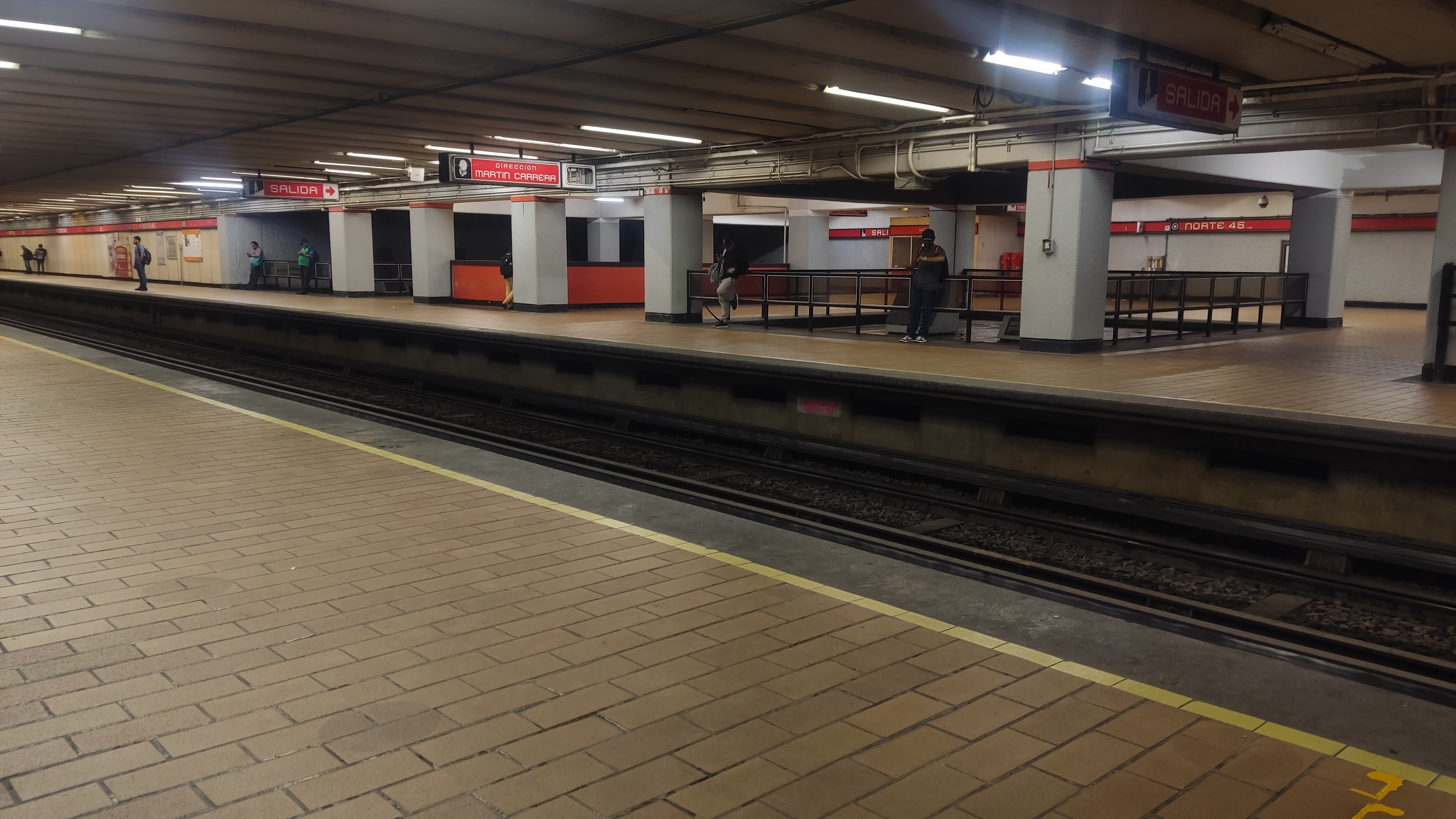

General information
- Location: Mexico City; Mexico
- Coordinates: 19°29′19″N 99°09′46″W
- System: Mexico City Metro
- Operator: Sistema de Transporte Colectivo (STC)
- Platforms: 2 side platforms
- Tracks: 2
- Connections: Norte 45 (at distance)

Construction
- Structure type: Underground

Other information
- Status: In service

History
- Opened: 21 December 1983; 42 years ago

Passengers
- 2025: 1,918,380 (Note: The data here is limited to the most recent ten years to avoid excessive listings; earlier figures can be found in this page's history or on the Mexico City Metro website. To calculate the average daily ridership, the annual total is divided by 365 days (366 in leap years), with decimals omitted from the result. Each station per line is ranked individually, as the system counts transfer stations separately. The percentage change is calculated automatically using the data from the current year and the previous year.) ▼1.92%
- Rank: 177/195

Services
Preceding station	Mexico City Metro	Following station
Ferrería toward El Rosario	Line 6	Vallejo toward Martín Carrera
Route map
Location
- Location within Mexico City
- Area map

Norte 45 (Spanish: Estación Norte 45) is a station on Line 6 of the Mexico City Metro. It is located in the Colonia Pueblo Salinas neighborhood.

The logo for this station is a compass rose and the station takes its name from a nearby street that runs from northeast to southwest (somewhat unusual for streets in Mexico City that typically run either north–south or east–west). The station opened on 21 December 1983.

From 23 April to 16 June 2020, the station was temporarily closed due to the COVID-19 pandemic in Mexico.

== Ridership ==
Annual passenger ridership
Year	Ridership	Average daily	Rank	% change	Ref.
2025	1,918,380	5,255	177/195	−1.92%
2024	1,955,874	5,343	168/195	−5.71%
2023	2,074,239	5,682	154/195	+5.44%
2022	1,967,214	5,389	154/195	+21.46%
2021	1,619,693	4,437	151/195	+8.43%
2020	1,493,775	4,081	167/195	−42.49%
2019	2,597,226	7,115	175/195	+0.04%
2018	2,596,118	7,112	174/195	+2.40%
2017	2,535,279	6,945	172/195	+4.12%
2016	2,434,878	6,652	178/195	−3.90%
