= Deportivo 18 de Marzo metro station =

Mexico City metro station

Deportivo 18 de Marzo
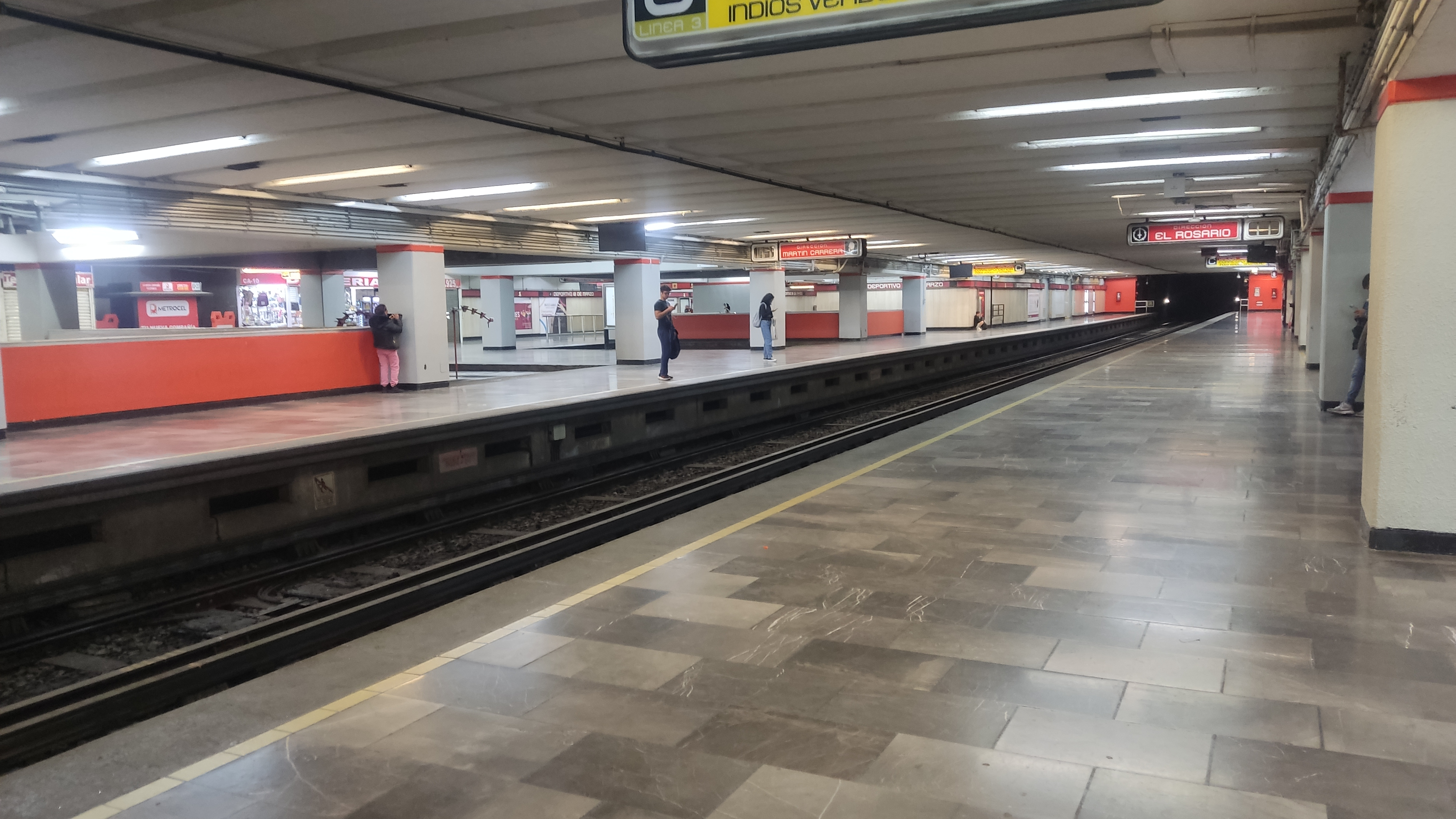
- Line 6 platforms

General information
- Location: Tepeyac Insurgentes, Gustavo A. Madero; Mexico City; Mexico
- Coordinates: 19°29′01″N 99°07′36″W
- System: Mexico City Metro
- Operator: Sistema de Transporte Colectivo (STC)
- Platforms: 1 island platform 2 side platforms
- Tracks: 4
- Connections: Deportivo 18 de Marzo; Deportivo 18 de Marzo

Construction
- Structure type: At grade Underground
- Parking: No
- Cycle facilities: Yes
- Accessible: Partial

Other information
- Status: In service

History
- Opened: 1 December 1979; 46 years ago 8 July 1986; 40 years ago
- Former names: Basílica

Passengers
- 2025: Total: 9,722,275; 9,234,945 (Note: The data here is limited to the most recent ten years to avoid excessive listings; earlier figures can be found in this page's history or on the Mexico City Metro website. To calculate the average daily ridership, the annual total is divided by 365 days (366 in leap years), with decimals omitted from the result. Each station per line is ranked individually, as the system counts transfer stations separately. The percentage change is calculated automatically using the data from the current year and the previous year.); 487,330 ▼1.83%
- Rank: 37/195; 194/195

Services
Preceding station	Mexico City Metro	Following station
Indios Verdes Terminus	Line 3	Potrero toward Universidad
Lindavista toward El Rosario	Line 6	La Villa-Basílica toward Martín Carrera
Route map
Location
- Location within Mexico City
- Area map

Deportivo 18 de Marzo is a station on the Mexico City Metro. It is located in Mexico City's Gustavo A. Madero borough.

== General information ==
The name of the station refers to the adjacent Deportivo 18 de Marzo sports complex, and its logo represents a player of a pre-Columbian ball game.

Metro Basílica logo

This station was previously known as Metro Basílica. Its logo and name were taken from the Basílica de Guadalupe Roman Catholic shrine, located one kilometer east of this station. When the Metro authorities changed the name of Metro La Villa to Metro La Villa-Basílica (a station that is only two blocks far Basílica de Guadalupe) they also changed the name of Metro Basílica.

Metro Deportivo 18 de Marzo was originally to be named Metro Montevideo (from nearby Avenida Montevideo), according to early plans for Line 3, so this station has changed its name twice.

This station serves the Tepeyac Insurgentes and Lindavista neighbourhoods. It offers a connection to Line 1 of the Mexico City Metrobús. Service to this metro station along Metro Line 3 opened on 1 December 1979. Service along Line 6 at the station started on 8 July 1986.

== Ridership ==
Annual passenger ridership (Line 3)
Year	Ridership	Average daily	Rank	% change	Ref.
2025	9,234,945	25,301	37/195	−2.31%
2024	9,453,739	25,829	29/195	−1.26%
2023	9,574,583	26,231	27/195	+13.07%
2022	8,468,149	23,200	28/195	+42.64%
2021	5,936,737	16,265	36/195	−11.49%
2020	6,707,415	18,376	35/195	−49.14%
2019	12,397,054	33,964	30/195	−5.99%
2018	13,187,272	36,129	25/195	+1.22%
2017	13,028,092	35,693	25/195	−2.58%
2016	13,373,725	36,540	27/195	−7.77%

Annual passenger ridership (Line 6)
Year	Ridership	Average daily	Rank	% change	Ref.
2025	487,330	1,335	194/195	+2.52%
2024	475,357	1,298	188/195	+17.67%
2023	460,241	1,260	186/195	+13.92%
2022	403,991	1,106	175/195	+24.76%
2021	323,811	887	194/195	+11.20%
2020	291,197	795	195/195	−62.39%
2019	644,226	1,765	195/195	−5.45%
2018	681,350	1,866	195/195	+2.74%
2017	663,193	1,816	195/195	−0.56%
2016	666,926	1,822	195/195	−26.60%

== Nearby ==
- Deportivo 18 de marzo, sports centre.
- Basilica of Our Lady of Guadalupe, Roman Catholic church, basilica and National shrine.

== Exits ==
=== Line 3 ===
- Northeast: Avenida de los Insurgentes Norte and Montiel street, Tepeyac Insurgentes
- Southeast: Avenida de los Insurgentes Norte and Montiel street, Tepeyac Insurgentes
- Northwest: Avenida de los Insurgentes Norte and Montiel street, Tepeyac Insurgentes

=== Line 6 ===
- Northwest: Avenida de los Insurgentes Norte and Avenida Ricarte, Lindavista
- Avenida Ricarte and Avenida de los Insurgentes Norte, Tepeyac Insurgentes

== Gallery ==
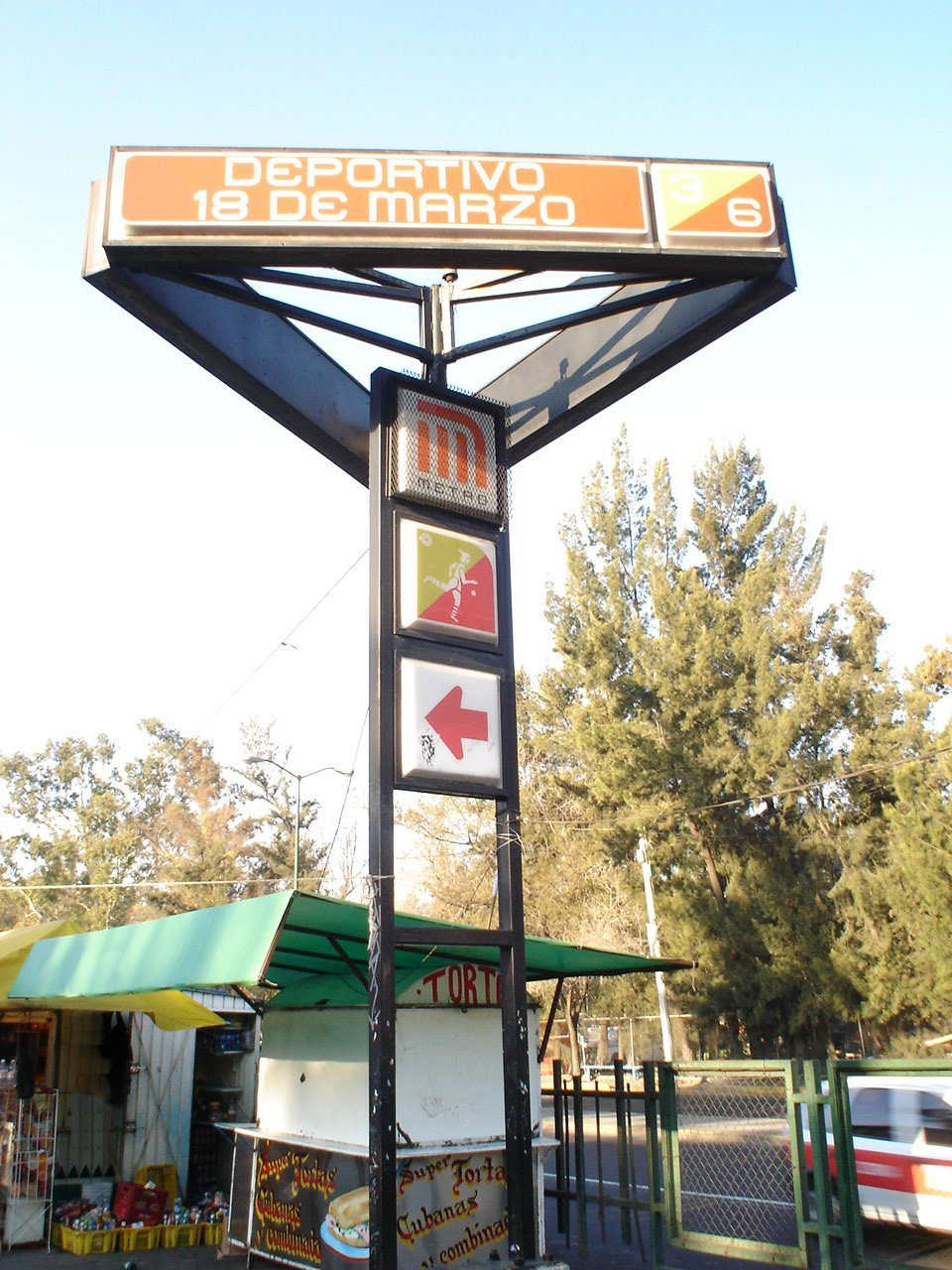
Station sign and vendor carts, 18 December 2006
