= Lindavista metro station =

Mexico City metro station

Lindavista
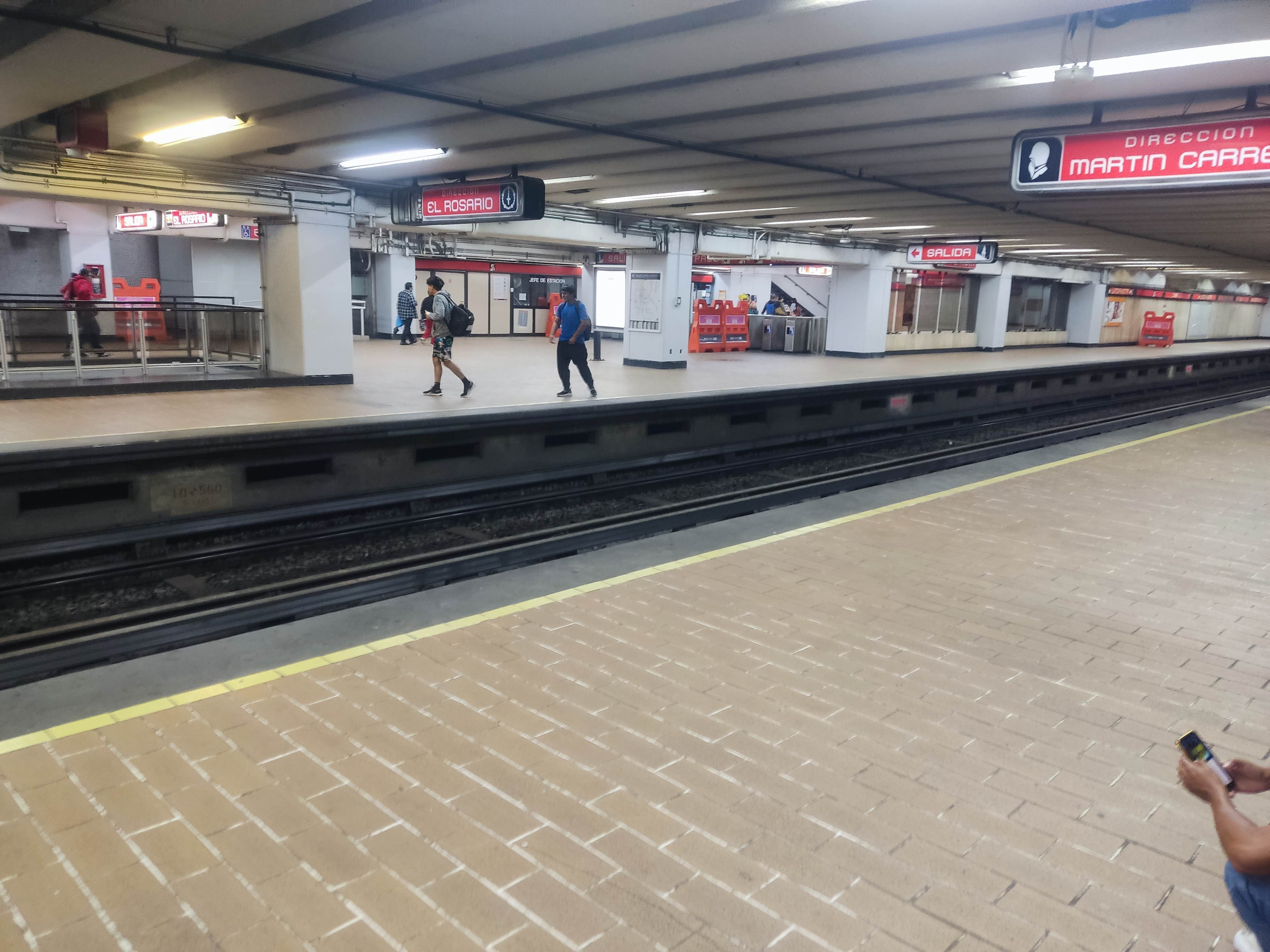
- The station in 2025

General information
- Location: Colector 13 street Lindavista, Gustavo A. Madero; Mexico City; Mexico
- Coordinates: 19°29′16″N 99°08′05″W
- System: Mexico City Metro
- Operator: Sistema de Transporte Colectivo (STC)
- Platforms: 2 side platforms
- Tracks: 2

Construction
- Structure type: Underground
- Accessible: Partial

Other information
- Status: In service

History
- Opened: 8 July 1986; 40 years ago

Passengers
- 2025: 5,037,606 (Note: The data here is limited to the most recent ten years to avoid excessive listings; earlier figures can be found in this page's history or on the Mexico City Metro website. To calculate the average daily ridership, the annual total is divided by 365 days (366 in leap years), with decimals omitted from the result. Each station per line is ranked individually, as the system counts transfer stations separately. The percentage change is calculated automatically using the data from the current year and the previous year.) ▼1.19%
- Rank: 104/195

Services
Preceding station	Mexico City Metro	Following station
Instituto del Petróleo toward El Rosario	Line 6	Deportivo 18 de Marzo toward Martín Carrera
Route map
Location
- Location within Mexico City
- Area map

Lindavista is a metro station along Line 6 of the Mexico City Metro. It is located in the Gustavo A. Madero borough. In 2019, the station had an average ridership of 17,878 passengers per day.

== Name and pictogram ==
The station is located and primarily serves the Lindavista neighborhood, a middle-class residential zone in the Gustavo A. Madero borough in northern Mexico City. Therefore, the station drew its name from the neighborhood. Its pictogram depicts the silhouette of the nearby Saint Cajetan church, which, itself, is another symbol of Lindavista.

== General information ==
Lindavista opened on 8 July 1986 as part of the second and final stretch of Line 6, going from Instituto del Petróleo to Martín Carrera, the line's current eastern terminus.

El muro de los lamentos, a mural by Daniel Kent can be found within the station.

=== Ridership ===
Annual passenger ridership
Year	Ridership	Average daily	Rank	% change	Ref.
2025	5,037,606	13,801	104/195	−1.19%
2024	5,098,291	13,929	95/195	−5.50%
2023	5,394,738	14,780	85/195	+22.04%
2022	4,420,462	12,110	97/195	+83.29%
2021	2,411,708	6,607	128/195	−11.42%
2020	2,722,552	7,438	128/195	−58.28%
2019	6,525,784	17,878	101/195	−2.52%
2018	6,694,207	18,340	96/195	+2.50%
2017	6,530,738	17,892	97/195	+1.57%
2016	6,429,652	17,567	104/195	+8.37%

== Gallery ==
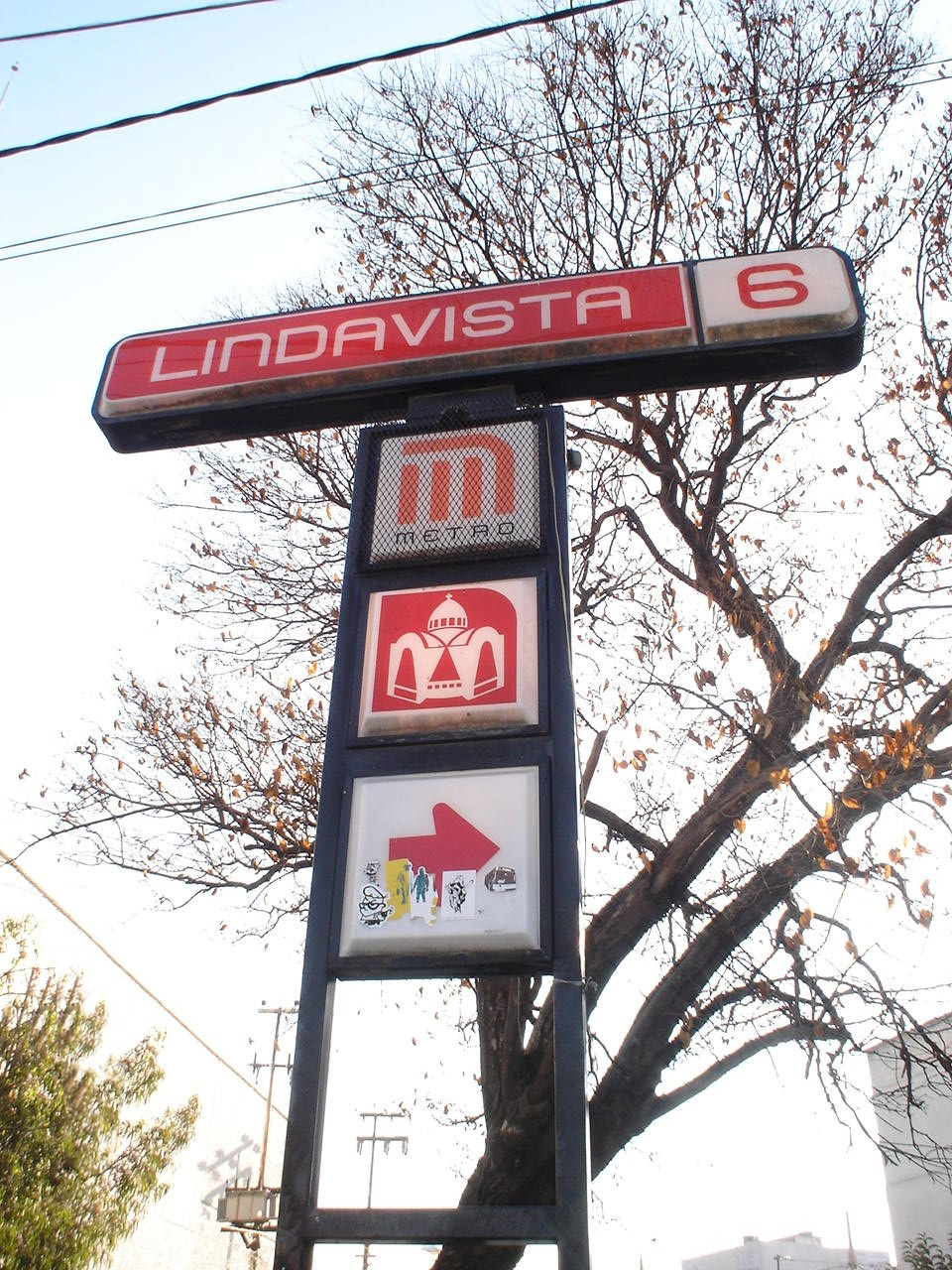
Entry sign to the station
