= UAM-Azcapotzalco metro station =

Mexico City metro station

UAM-Azcapotzalco
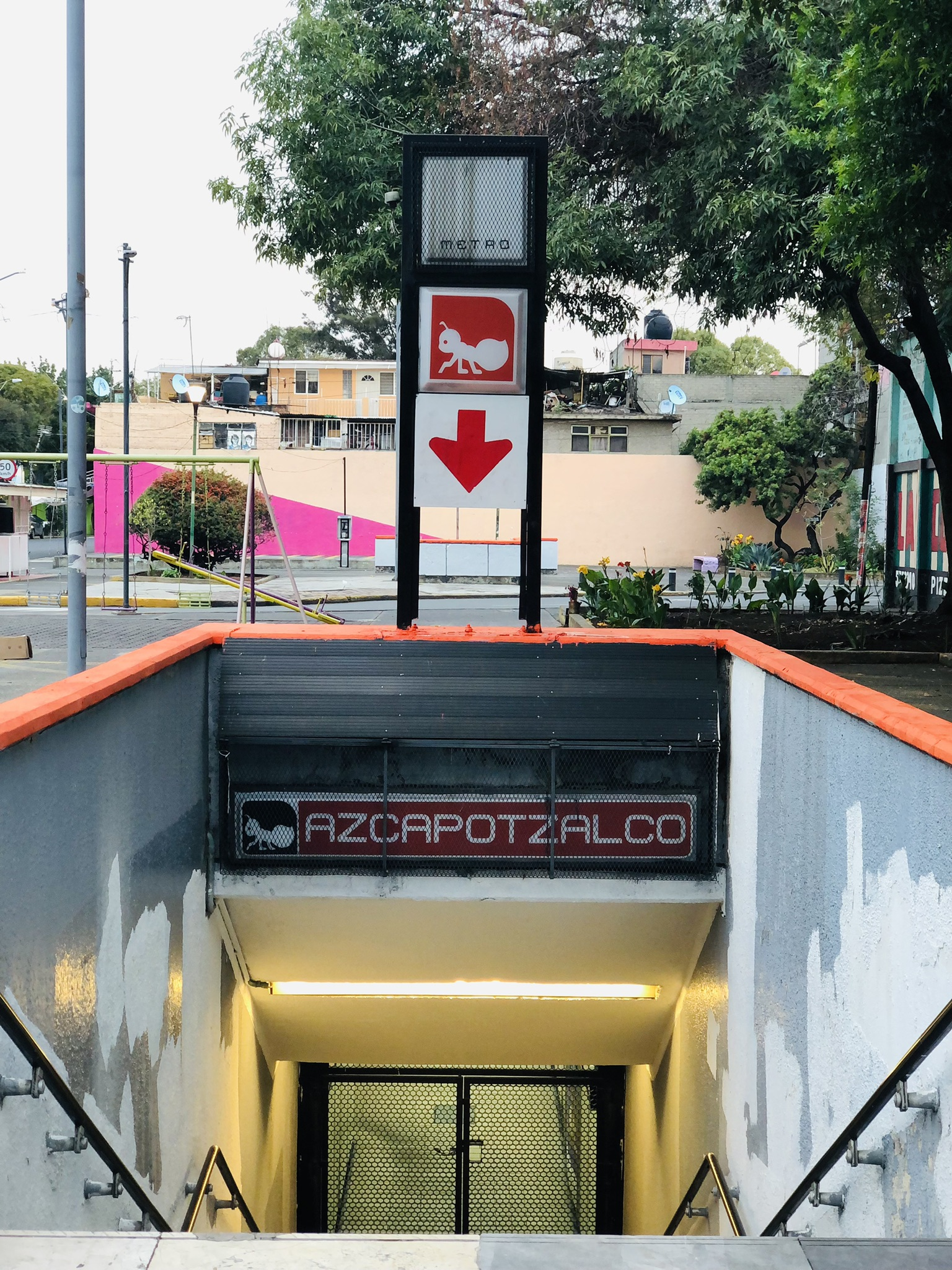

General information
- Location: Mexico City; Mexico
- Coordinates: 19°29′28″N 99°11′11″W
- System: Mexico City Metro
- Operator: Sistema de Transporte Colectivo (STC)
- Platforms: 2 side platforms
- Tracks: 2

Construction
- Structure type: Underground

Other information
- Status: In service

History
- Opened: 21 December 1983; 42 years ago
- Former names: Azcapotzalco

Passengers
- 2025: 2,442,376 (Note: The data here is limited to the most recent ten years to avoid excessive listings; earlier figures can be found in this page's history or on the Mexico City Metro website. To calculate the average daily ridership, the annual total is divided by 365 days (366 in leap years), with decimals omitted from the result. Each station per line is ranked individually, as the system counts transfer stations separately. The percentage change is calculated automatically using the data from the current year and the previous year.) ▼0.81%
- Rank: 164/195

Services
Preceding station	Mexico City Metro	Following station
Tezozómoc toward El Rosario	Line 6	Ferrería/Arena Ciudad de México toward Martín Carrera
Route map
Location
- Location within Mexico City
- Area map

UAM-Azcapotzalco (Spanish pronunciation; formerly Azcapotzalco) is a metro station in northern Mexico City, located in the Azcapotzalco borough, along Line 6. In 2019, the station had an average ridership of 8,076 passengers per day.

== General information ==
Azcapotzalco was opened on 21 December 1983, as part of the first stretch of Line 6, going from El Rosario to Instituto del Petróleo.

The station serves the Reynosa Tamaulipas, San Andrés and San Marcos neighborhoods. It is also close to Azcapotzalco's downtown and city hall as well as to the Universidad Autónoma Metropolitana Azcapotzalco campus.

=== Name and pictogram ===
The station was originally named Azcapotzalco. This was decided due to the fact that Metro Azcapotzalco was the closest station to downtown Azcapotzalco and to the municipality's city hall.

The station's pictogram depict an ant because Azcapotzalco's ancient meaning literally translates to "in the place of the anthills".

=== Ridership ===
Annual passenger ridership
Year	Ridership	Average daily	Rank	% change	Ref.
2025	2,442,376	6,691	164/195	−0.81%
2024	2,462,340	6,727	154/195	+0.58%
2023	2,448,202	6,707	144/195	+15.77%
2022	2,114,779	5,793	151/195	+46.86%
2021	1,439,985	3,945	157/195	−19.74%
2020	1,794,159	4,902	157/195	−39.14%
2019	2,947,847	8,076	166/195	+0.44%
2018	2,935,018	8,041	165/195	−1.20%
2017	2,970,709	8,138	164/195	−2.89%
2016	3,058,994	8,357	161/195	−3.39%
