= Ferrería/Arena Ciudad de México metro station =

Mexico City metro station

Ferrería / Arena CDMX
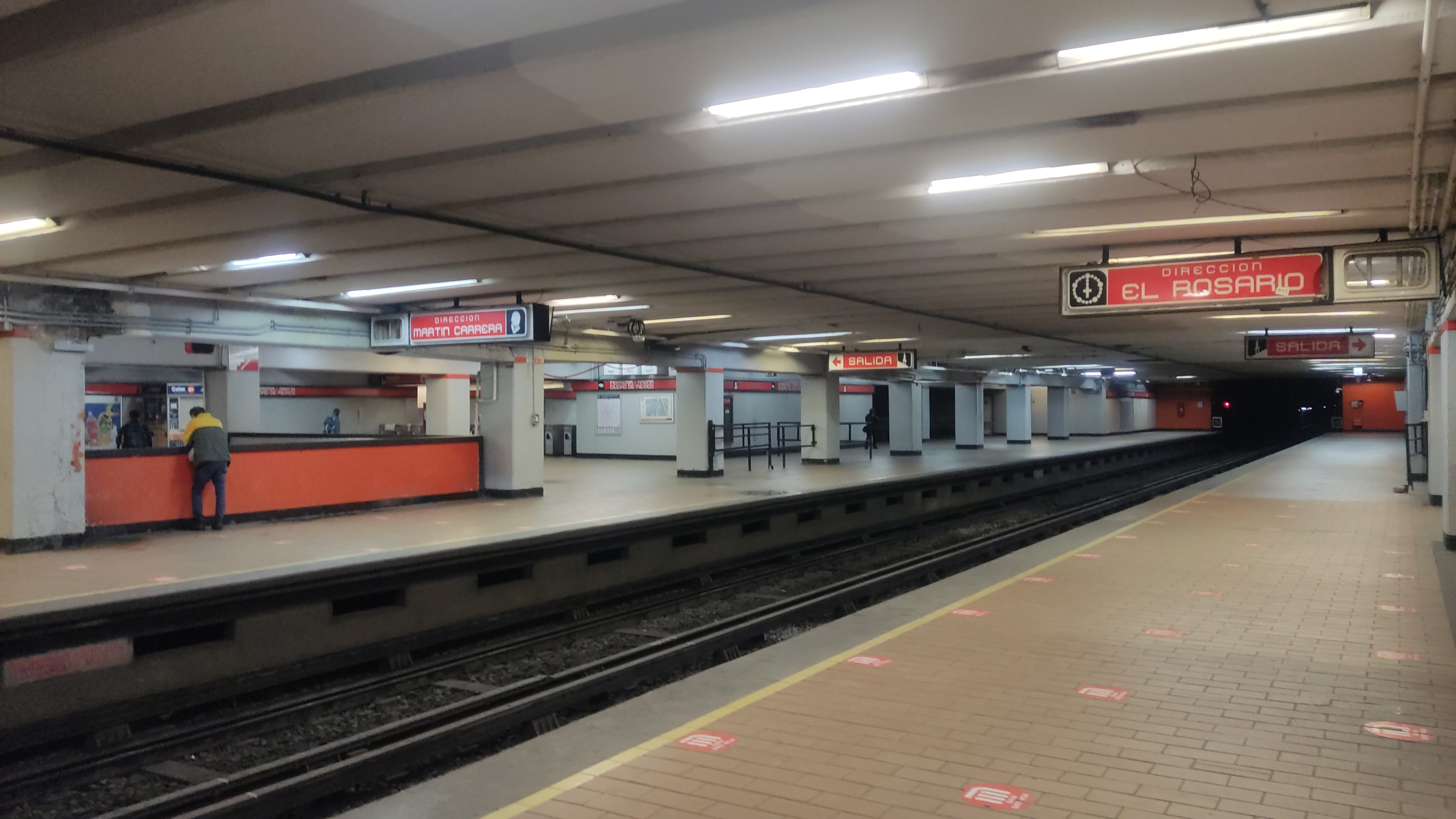
- Platforms, 2022

General information
- Location: Antigua Calzada de Guadalupe; Azcapotzalco, Mexico City; Mexico
- Coordinates: 19°29′27″N 99°10′26″W
- System: Mexico City Metro
- Operator: Sistema de Transporte Colectivo (STC)
- Platforms: 2 side platforms
- Tracks: 2
- Connections: Fortuna

Construction
- Structure type: Underground

Other information
- Status: In service

History
- Opened: 21 December 1983; 42 years ago
- Former names: Ferrería

Passengers
- 2025: 6,637,584 (Note: The data here is limited to the most recent ten years to avoid excessive listings; earlier figures can be found in this page's history or on the Mexico City Metro website. To calculate the average daily ridership, the annual total is divided by 365 days (366 in leap years), with decimals omitted from the result. Each station per line is ranked individually, as the system counts transfer stations separately. The percentage change is calculated automatically using the data from the current year and the previous year.) ▲0.42%
- Rank: 65/195

Services
Preceding station	Mexico City Metro	Following station
Azcapotzalco toward El Rosario	Line 6	Norte 45 toward Martín Carrera
Route map
Location
- Location within Mexico City
- Area map and exits

Ferrería/Arena Ciudad de México (Spanish pronunciation; formerly Ferrería) is a station along Line 6 of the Mexico City Metro. It is located in the Azcapotzalco municipality, in the north of Mexico City. In 2019, the station had an average ridership of 23,779 passengers per day.

== Name and iconography ==
Before 2012, the station was known only as Ferrería and its icon depicted the head of a cow. This was a reference to a cattle ranch that existed nearby, known as Ferrería; there was also a train station that serviced this ranch.

In 2012, the Arena Ciudad de México was inaugurated, built-in part of the grounds of the former Hacienda Ferrería and within walking distance of the Ferrería station. The name of the station was then changed on 29 November 2012 from Ferrería to Ferrería/Arena Ciudad de México. The pictogram was also modified, with the new icon depicting the stylized façade of the Mexico City Arena.

== General information ==
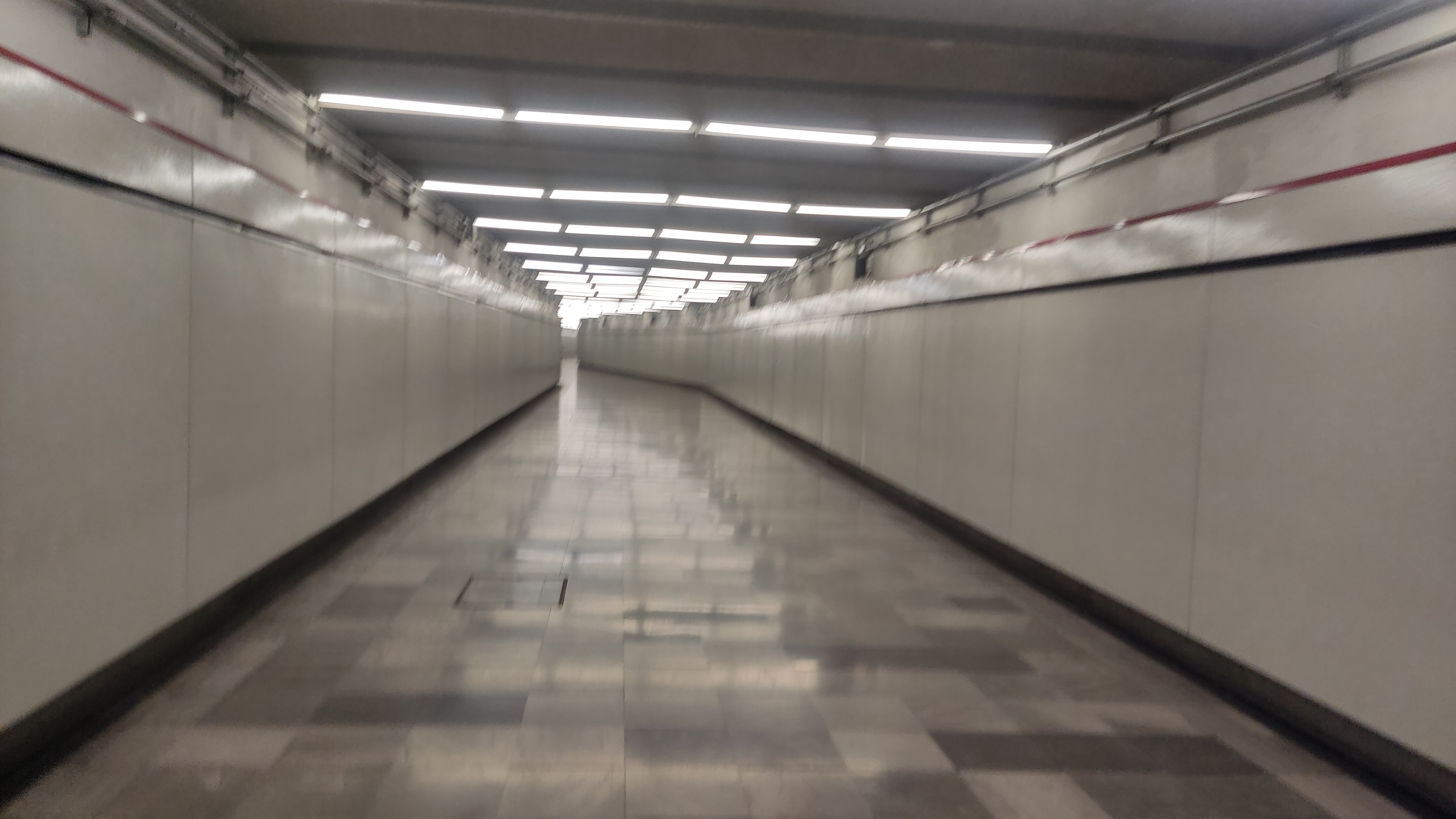
The underground tunnel connecting both stations

Metro Ferrería/Arena Ciudad de México runs under Avenida Antigua Calzada de Guadalupe and serves the Colonia Santa Catarina neighbourhood. The station was opened on 21 December 1983.

The station connects with the Fortuna station, servicing the Ferrocarril Suburbano, through an underground tunnel.

Arena Ciudad de México, an indoor sports and entertainment venue is within walking distance from the station.

=== Ridership ===
Annual passenger ridership
Year	Ridership	Average daily	Rank	% change	Ref.
2025	6,637,584	18,185	65/195	+0.42%
2024	6,610,102	18,060	62/195	−4.77%
2023	6,941,376	19,017	60/195	+17.58%
2022	5,903,428	16,173	66/195	+67.50%
2021	3,524,534	9,656	88/195	−16.54%
2020	4,222,934	11,538	86/195	−51.35%
2019	8,679,563	23,779	59/195	−0.67%
2018	8,738,309	29,940	61/195	+5.28%
2017	8,299,914	22,739	67/195	−3.98%
2016	8,644,085	23,617	68/195	−1.69%

== Gallery ==
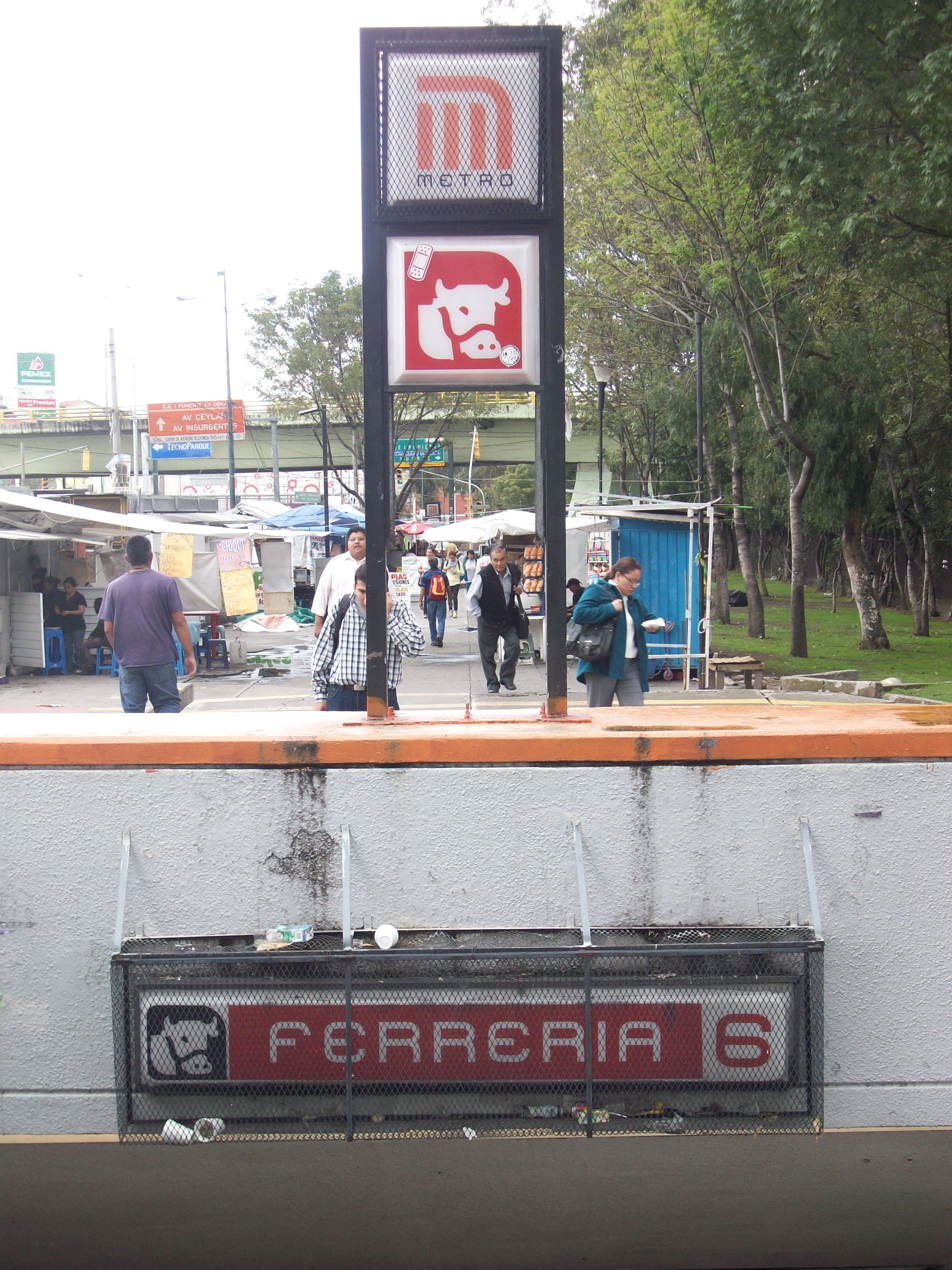
Entry sign to the station with the previous name and pictogram

Entry sign to the station with the current name and pictogram
