= Line 6 =

Line 6 may refer to:

== Transport ==
=== Asia ===
==== China ====
- Line 6 (Beijing Subway), a subway line in Beijing
- Line 6 (Changsha Metro), a metro line in Changsha, Hunan
- Line 6 (Chengdu Metro), from Pidu District to Tianfu New Area, Chengdu, Sichuan
- Line 6 (Chongqing Rail Transit), a metro line in Chongqing
- Line 6 (Fuzhou Metro), from Cangshan District to Changle District, Fuzhou, Fujian
- Line 6 (Guangzhou Metro), a metro line in Guangzhou, Guangdong
- Line 6 (Hangzhou Metro), a metro line in Hangzhou, Zhejiang
- Line 6 (Hefei Metro), a metro line in Hefei, Anhui
- Line 6 (Jinan Metro), a metro line in Jinan, Shandong
- Line 6 (Kunming Metro), a metro line in Kunming, Yunnan
- Line 6 (Nanjing Metro), a future metro line in Nanjing, Jiangsu
- Line 6 (Ningbo Rail Transit), a metro line in Ningbo, Zhejiang
- Line 6 (Shanghai Metro), a metro line in Shanghai
- Line 6 (Shenzhen Metro), a metro line in Shenzhen, Guangdong
- Line 6 (Suzhou Metro), a metro line in Suzhou, Jiangsu
- Line 6 (Tianjin Metro), a metro line in Tianjin
- Line 6 (Wuhan Metro), a metro line in Wuhan, Hubei
- Line 6 (Xi'an Metro), a metro line in Xi'an, Shaanxi
- Line 6 (Xuzhou Metro), a metro line in Xuzhou, Jiangsu
- Line 6 (Xiamen Metro), a metro line in Xiamen and Zhangzhou, Fujian
- Line 6 (Zhengzhou Metro), a metro line in Zhengzhou, Henan

==== Other places in Asia ====
- Line 6 (Mumbai Metro), also called the Lokhandwala-Jogeshwari-Vikhroli-Kanjurmarg corridor, Mumbai, India
- Orange Line (Kolkata Metro), India
- Line 6 (Osaka), an underground rapid transit line in Osaka, Japan
- Line 6 (Riyadh Metro), Saudi Arabia
- Seoul Subway Line 6, a line of the Seoul Subway, South Korea
- Circular line (Taipei metropolitan area), the sixth line to open in the Taipei Metro system, now a line of the New Taipei Metro, Taiwan
- KLIA Ekspres, called Line 6 at route map
- Manila Light Rail Transit System Line 6, Metro Manila, Philippines
- MRT Line 6 (Dhaka Metro), Metro Rail Line 6 in Dhaka, Bangladesh

=== Europe ===
==== France ====
- Île-de-France tramway Line 6, a rubber-tyred tramway in Île-de-France
- Paris Metro Line 6, a line of the Paris Metro rapid transit system

==== Austria ====
- U6 (Berlin U-Bahn), a metro line in Berlin U-Bahn
- U6 (Frankfurt U-Bahn), a metro line in Frankfurt U-Bahn

==== Spain ====
- Barcelona Metro line 6, on the Barcelona–Vallès Line
- Line 6 (Madrid Metro), one of two circular lines in Madrid

==== Other places in Europe ====
- Line 6 (Moscow Metro), a metro line of the Moscow Metro, Moscow, Russia. Also known as "Kaluzhsko–Rizhskaya line".
- Line 6 (Saint Petersburg Metro), a metro line of the Saint Petersburg Metro, Moscow, Russia. Also known as "Krasnoselsko–Kalininskaya line".
- Line 6 (Naples Metro), a light metro line that forms part of the Naples Metro

=== North America ===
==== Canada ====
- Line 6 (Montreal Metro), a proposed surface-running line of the Montreal Metro
- Line 6 Finch West, a light rail line in Toronto

==== Mexico ====
- Mexico City Metro Line 6, Mexico
- Mexico City Metrobús Line 6, a bus rapid transit line in Mexico City
- Metrorrey Line 6, an upcoming line currently under construction in Monterrey.

==== United States ====
- 6 (New York City Subway service), the 6 Lexington Avenue Local and 6 Pelham Bay Park Express, New York
- 6 (BMT rapid transit service), the designation for trains that used the BMT Fifth Avenue Line, New York City, New York
- No. 6 Line (Baltimore streetcar), a bus route operated by the Maryland Transit Administration, Baltimore, Maryland
- 6 (Los Angeles Railway), former streetcar service

=== South America ===
- Line 6 (São Paulo Metro), a planned extension of the São Paulo Metro, Brazil
- Santiago Metro Line 6, connecting the communes of Cerrillos and Providencia in Santiago, Chile

=== Oceania ===
==== Australia ====
- T6 Carlingford Line, Sydney Trains service prior to its closure in 2020
- T6 Lidcombe & Bankstown Line, Sydney Trains service, 2024–

== Other uses ==
- Line 6 (company), a manufacturer of digital modeling guitars, amplifiers and related electronic equipment

== See also ==
- 6 Train (disambiguation)
- List of public transport routes numbered 6
- List of highways numbered 6
