= Vallejo metro station =

Mexico City metro station

Vallejo
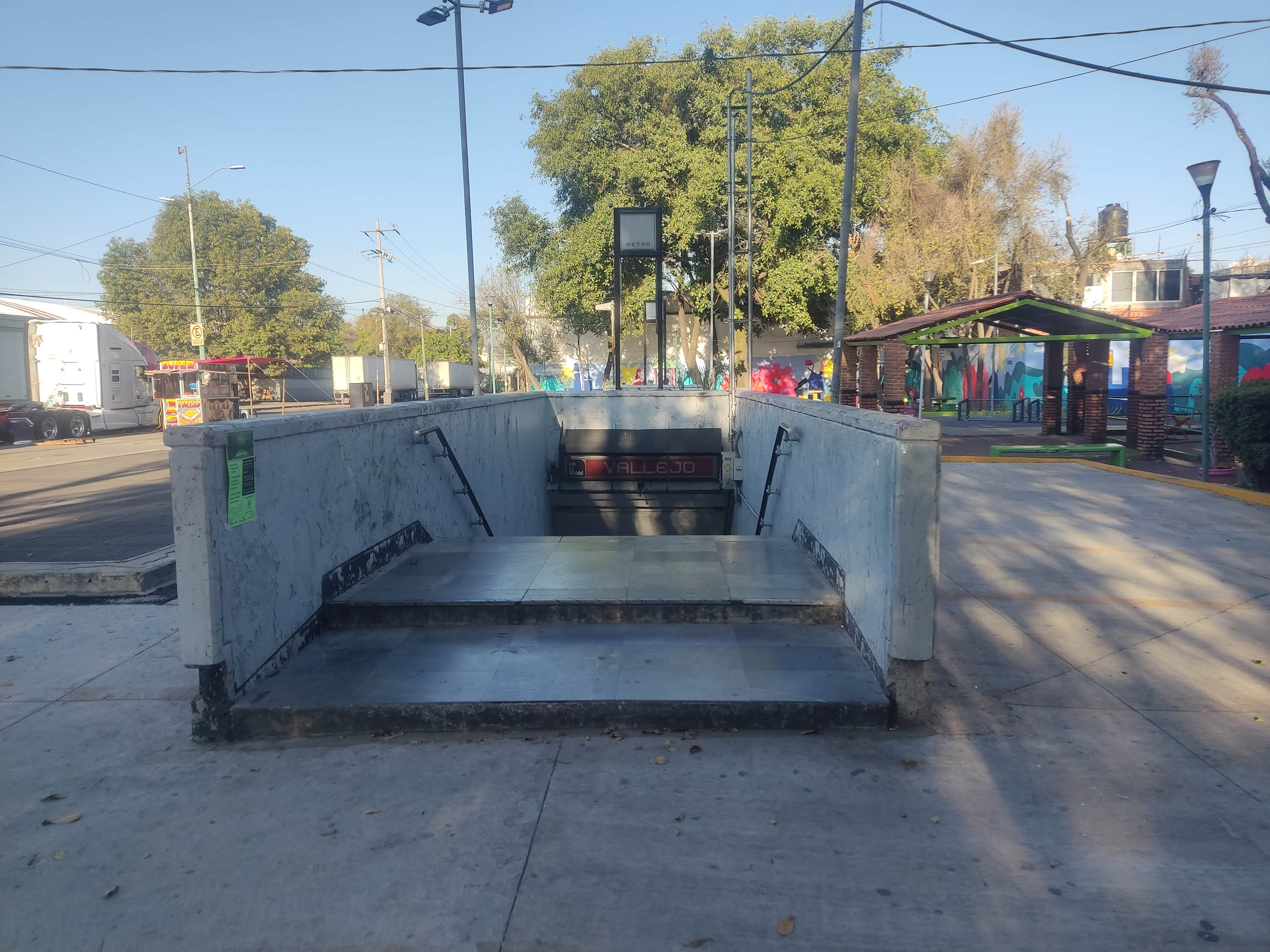
- The station's entrance in 2025

General information
- Location: Mexico City; Mexico
- Coordinates: 19°29′23″N 99°09′22″W
- System: Mexico City Metro
- Operator: Sistema de Transporte Colectivo (STC)
- Platforms: 2 side platforms
- Tracks: 2
- Connections: Poniente 128; Poniente 134

Construction
- Structure type: Underground

Other information
- Status: In service

History
- Opened: 21 December 1983; 42 years ago

Passengers
- 2025: 2,402,503 (Note: The data here is limited to the most recent ten years to avoid excessive listings; earlier figures can be found in this page's history or on the Mexico City Metro website. To calculate the average daily ridership, the annual total is divided by 365 days (366 in leap years), with decimals omitted from the result. Each station per line is ranked individually, as the system counts transfer stations separately. The percentage change is calculated automatically using the data from the current year and the previous year.) ▲2.44%
- Rank: 166/195

Services
Preceding station	Mexico City Metro	Following station
Norte 45 toward El Rosario	Line 6	Instituto del Petróleo toward Martín Carrera
Route map
Location
- Location within Mexico City
- Area map

Vallejo (Spanish: Estación Vallejo) is a station along Line 6 of the Mexico City Metro. It is located in the Colonia Vallejo neighborhood of the Azcapotzalco borough of northwestern Mexico City.

Its logo represents a silhouette of a factory. The station opened on 21 December 1983.

== Ridership ==
Annual passenger ridership
Year	Ridership	Average daily	Rank	% change	Ref.
2025	2,402,503	6,582	166/195	+2.44%
2024	2,345,333	6,408	158/195	−6.56%
2023	2,509,970	6,876	143/195	+1.03%
2022	2,484,480	6,806	141/195	+27.02%
2021	1,955,966	5,358	140/195	−7.38%
2020	2,111,764	5,769	151/195	−25.79%
2019	2,845,748	7,796	169/195	+2.57%
2018	2,774,548	7,601	170/195	−1.56%
2017	2,818,557	7,722	168/195	−7.66%
2016	3,052,441	8,340	162/195	+14.86%
