= Instituto del Petróleo metro station =

Mexico City Metro station

Instituto del Petróleo
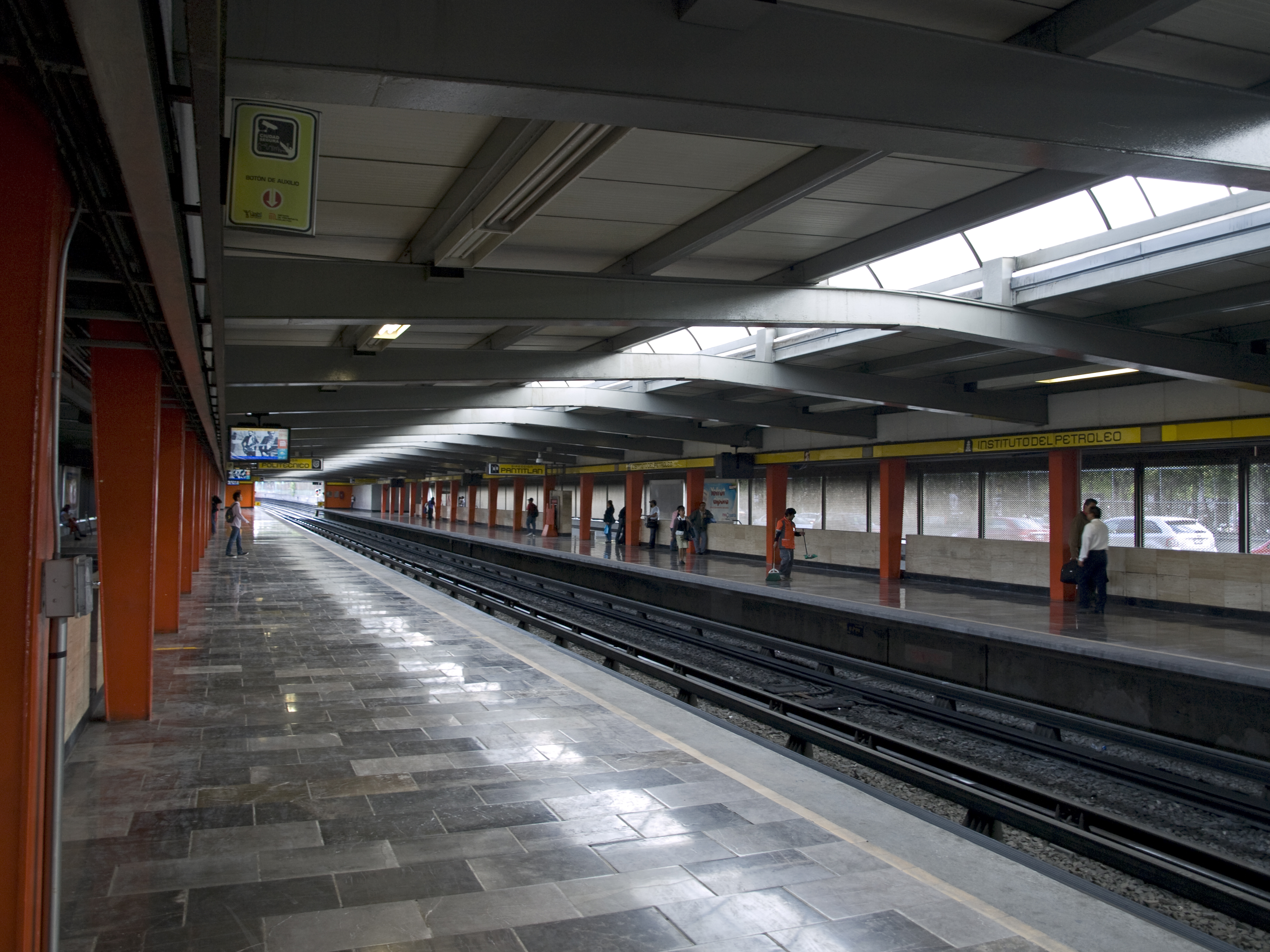
- Line 5 platforms, 2014

General information
- Location: Eje Central; Poniente 134 Street; Gustavo A. Madero, Mexico City; Mexico
- Coordinates: 19°29′22″N 99°08′43″W
- System: Mexico City Metro
- Owner: Government of Mexico City
- Operator: Sistema de Transporte Colectivo (STC)
- Platforms: 4 side platforms (2 per line)
- Tracks: 4 (2 per line)
- Connections: Instituto del Petróleo; Routes: 23, 103; Trolleybus Line 1: Instituto del Petróleo; Trolleybus Line 8: Montevideo

Construction
- Structure type: At grade; Underground

Other information
- Status: In service

History
- Opened: 30 August 1982; 44 years ago; 21 December 1983; 42 years ago

Passengers
- 2025: 2,767,146 (Note: The Mexico City Metro system counts the entries from interchange stations separately. When counted individually, 1,799,542 passengers accessed through Line 5, while 967,604 passengers did it through Line 6.) (Note: The system's website counts only passenger entries into stations and does not include passengers passing through, transferring between lines, or exiting the station. The data here is limited to the most recent ten years to avoid excessive listings; earlier figures can be found in this page's history or on the Mexico City Metro website. To calculate the average daily ridership, the annual total is divided by 365 days (366 in leap years), with decimals omitted from the result. Each station per line is ranked individually, as the system counts transfer stations separately. The percentage change is calculated automatically using the data from the current year and the previous year.) ▼0.17%
- Rank: 181/195; 191/195

Services
Preceding station	Mexico City Metro	Following station
Politécnico Terminus	Line 5	Autobuses del Norte toward Pantitlán
Vallejo toward El Rosario	Line 6	Lindavista toward Martín Carrera
Route map
Location
- Location within Mexico City
- Area map and exits

Instituto del Petróleo metro station (Note: Estación del Metro Instituto del Petróleo. Spanish pronunciation: [instiˈtuto ðel peˈtɾoleo]. The name of the station literally means "Petroleum Institute" in Spanish.) is a transfer station on the Mexico City Metro in Gustavo A. Madero, Mexico City. Instituto del Petróleo is a combined underground and at-grade station divided into two lines. It serves Lines 5 (Yellow Line) and 6 (Red Line), each with two side platforms. Instituto del Petróleo metro station is located between Politécnico and Autobuses del Norte stations on Line 5, and between Vallejo and Lindavista stations on Line 6. The stop serves the Colonias (neighborhoods) of Valle del Tepeyac, San Bartolo Atepehuacan, and Nueva Industrial. The Line 5 building is situated along Eje Central Avenue.

Instituto del Petróleo metro station opened on 30 August 1982 as part of the extending service from La Raza to Politécnico station, with eastbound service to Pantitlán. Service on Line 6 began on 21 December 1983 as the temporary eastern terminal of the line.

The pictogram representing Instituto del Petróleo metro station depicts an oil derrick, and the station's name references the nearby Mexican Petroleum Institute headquarters. Inside the station, there is a collection of sculptures titled Petróleo, made of oil drums and created by Mexican artist Ernesto Paulsen Camba.

In 2025, Instituto del Petróleo served 2,767,146 passenger entries, making it one of the least-accessed transfer stations in the system and one of the least-used stations on either of its lines.

== Location and layout ==
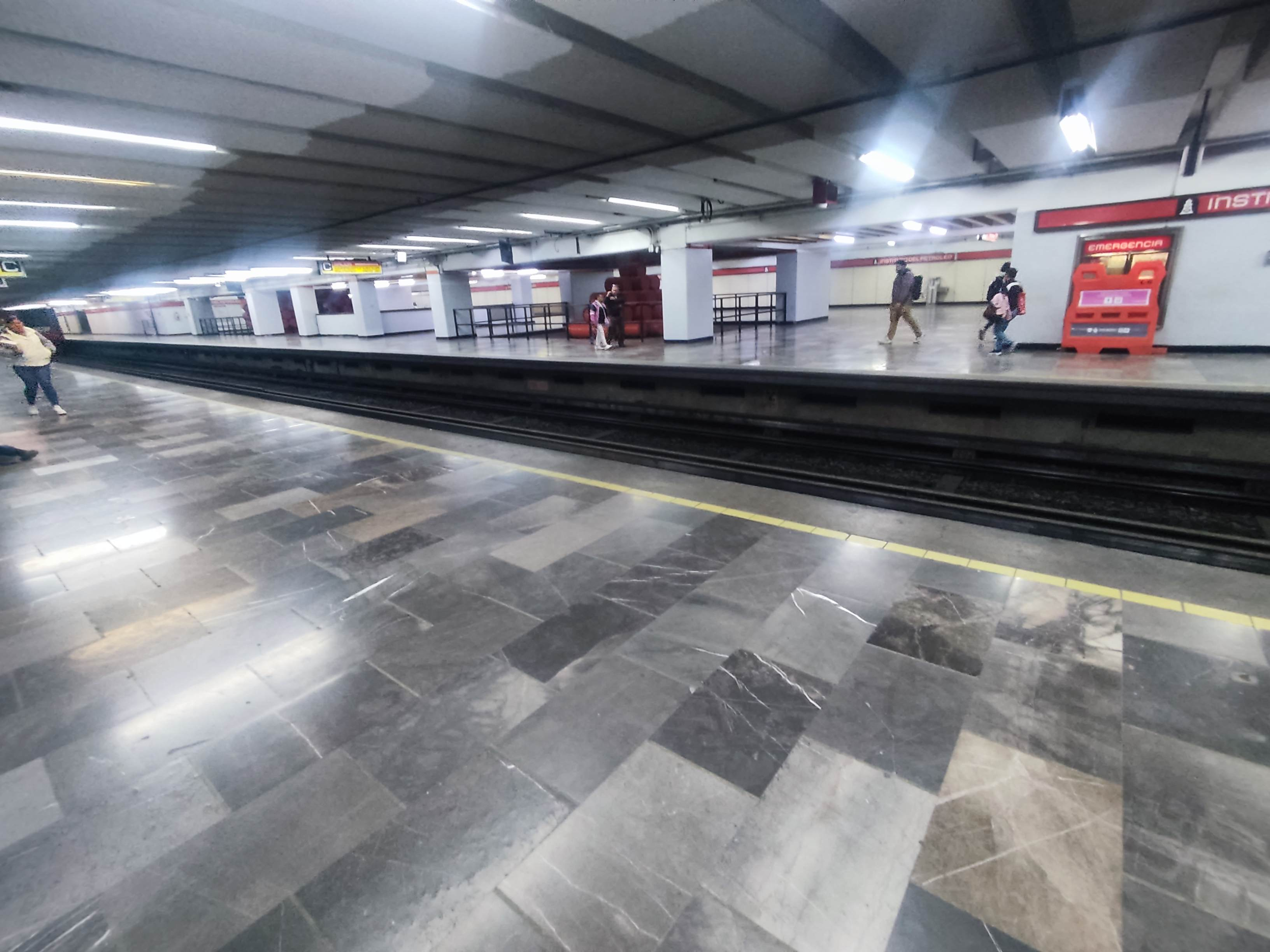
Line 6 platforms in 2025

Instituto del Petróleo is a transfer metro station, located in the Colonias (neighborhoods) of Valle del Tepeyac, San Bartolo Atepehuacan, and Nueva Industrial, in Gustavo A. Madero borough, northern Mexico City. The stop is situated along Eje Central (Line 5), and below Calle Poniente 134 (Line 6).

Within the system, it is followed by Politécnico and Autobuses del Norte stations on Line 5 and Vallejo and Lindavista stations on Line 6. The station has six exits. On Line 5, the northeast and northwest exits provide access to Eje Central and Calle Masagua in Colonia Valle del Tepeyac. The southeast and southwest exits provide access to Eje Central, at Calle Otavalo and Calle Poniente 128, respectively, in Colonia San Bartolo Atepehuacan. On Line 6, the northern and southern exits provide access to Calle Poniente 134 in Colonia Nueva Industrial.

The area is serviced by Line 6 of the Metrobús system at Instituto del Petróleo station, a few blocks away; by Line 1 and 8 (formerly Lines A and CP, respectively) of the trolleybus system, and by Routes 23 and 103 of the Red de Transporte de Pasajeros network.

The passenger transfer tunnel at Instituto del Petróleo metro station has an approximate length of 500 meters (1,600 ft), making it the fifth-longest in the system. It has an overpass that allows passengers traveling in one direction to walk above those traveling in the opposite direction for greater pedestrian flow.

== History and construction ==
=== Name and pictogram ===
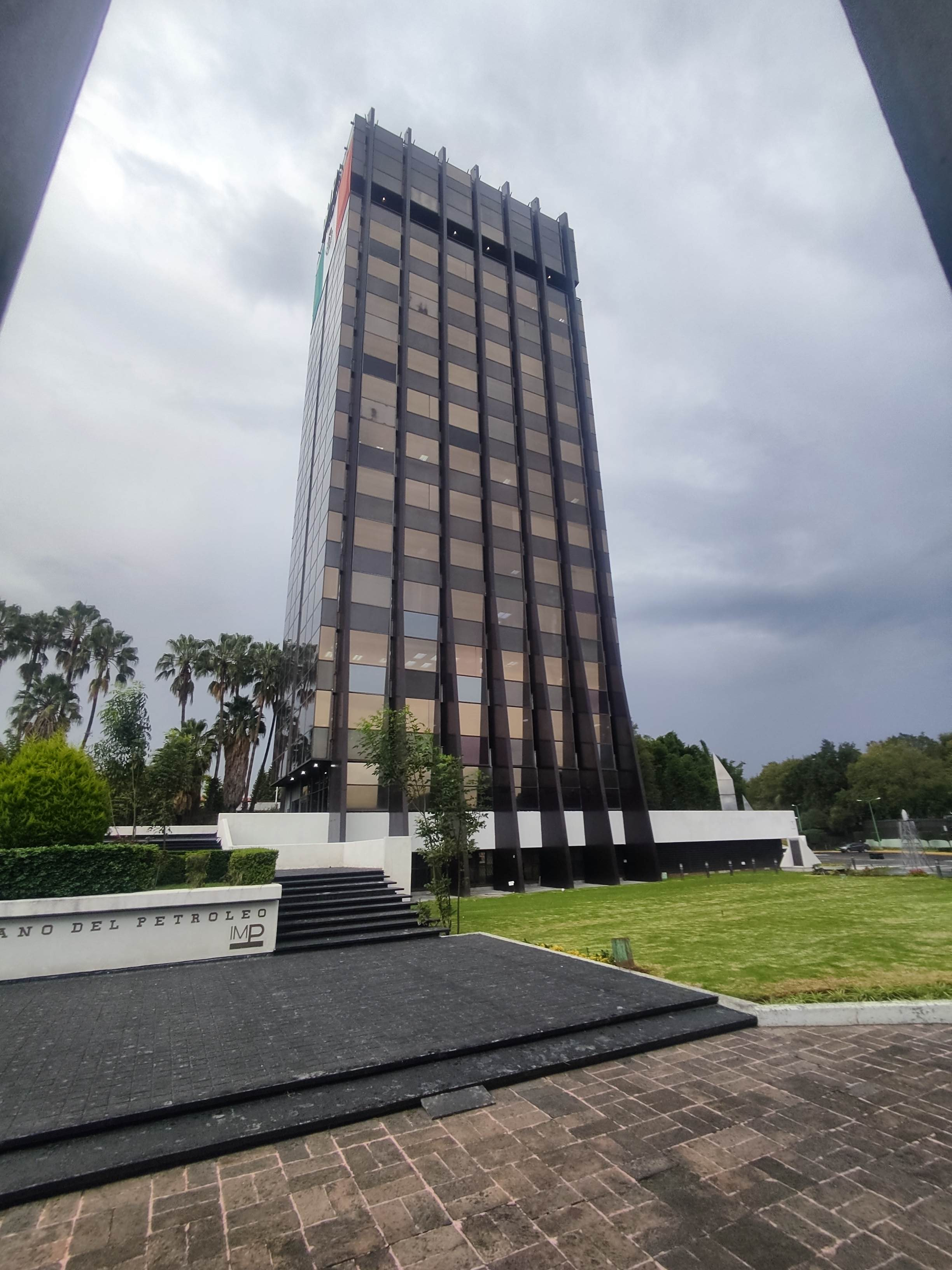
The station services the Mexican Petroleum Institute headquarters (pictured).

The station's pictogram depicts an oil derrick and its name references the Mexican Petroleum Institute, whose headquarters are in the zone.

=== Line 5 ===
The station was built Cometro, a subsidiary of Empresas ICA. It was opened on 30 August 1982, providing service northward toward Politécnico station and southward toward Pantitlán station.

The station was built at grade level, and the section between Instituto del Petróleo and Politécnico is 1,188 meters (3,898 ft) long, while the opposite section toward Autobuses del Norte measures 1,067 meters (3,501 ft).

In June 2006, Metro authorities replaced the railroad switches; in 2008, the station received roof maintenance.

=== Line 6 ===
The station was built by Cometro. It opened on 21 December 1983, as the line's eastern terminal station, providing western service toward El Rosario station. Eastern service toward Martín Carrera started on 8 July 1986.

The station was built underground. The section toward Vallejo is 755 meters (2,477 ft) long, while the opposite tunnel toward Lindavista is 1,258 meters (4,127 ft) long.

=== Incidents ===
On 19 July 2018, a 16-year-old man was stabbed with a pair of scissors by a 40-year-old man on the station's platforms. The injury did not require hospitalization, and the assailant was referred to the Public Prosecutor's Office. On 8 November 2020, Instituto del Petróleo, Politécnico, and Lindavista stations were vandalized during feminist demonstrations. Walls, screens, handrails, a train, and a mural were damaged and covered in graffiti.

=== Landmarks ===
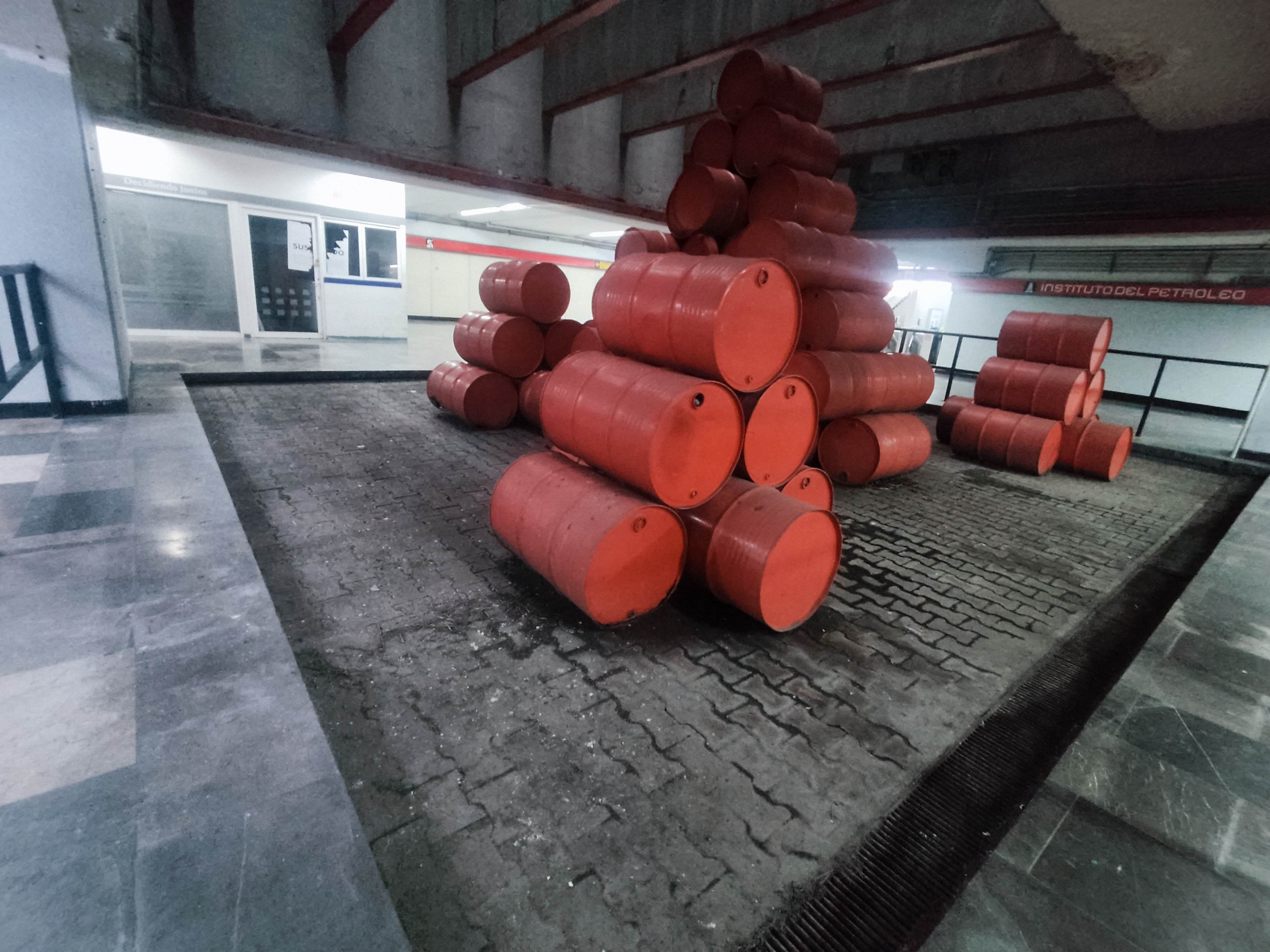
One of the Petróleo sculptures found inside Line 6

Inside Instituto del Petróleo metro station are seven sculptures specifically created for the station. The collection, titled Petróleo (1986), is made of wrought iron oil drums, and was created by Mexican sculptor Ernesto Paulsen Camba. They are placed at the station's platforms and transfer tunnel.

The station also has an Internet café and a health module.

== Ridership ==
Daily ridership for Line 5 in 2024

Daily ridership for Line 6 in 2024

According to official data, Line 5 records higher entries than Line 6, and both are among the least accessed in the system. Prior to the impact of the COVID-19 pandemic, Instituto del Petróleo metro station recorded a total ridership of 3,398,142 passengers in 2019, averaging 9,309 daily entries.

The station's total ridership for 2025 was 2,767,146 passengers, with a daily average of 7,581 entries. By line, Line 5 recorded 1,799,542 passengers, averaging 4,930 per day. Line 6 recorded 967,604 passengers, averaging 2,650. In the same year, when considered individually among the system's 195 stations, the Line 5 station ranked 181st busiest, while the Line 6 station ranked 191st.

Annual passenger ridership (Line 5)
Year	Ridership	Average daily	Rank	% change	Ref.
2025	1,799,542	4,930	181/195	−1.47%	
2024	1,826,472	4,990	171/195	+2.08%	
2023	1,789,207	4,901	164/195	+10.27%	
2022	1,622,528	4,445	162/195	+43.12%	
2021	1,133,656	3,105	169/195	−8.82%	
2020	1,243,272	3,396	179/195	−43.88%	
2019	2,215,325	6,069	180/195	+1.85%	
2018	2,175,015	5,958	181/195	+7.94%	
2017	2,014,941	5,520	184/195	+1.17%	
2016	1,991,703	5,441	184/195	−3.48%	

Annual passenger ridership (Line 6)
Year	Ridership	Average daily	Rank	% change	Ref.
2025	967,604	2,650	191/195	+2.34%	
2024	945,495	2,583	184/195	−1.76%	
2023	962,394	2,636	178/195	+10.61%	
2022	870,085	2,383	173/195	+71.65%	
2021	506,888	1,388	192/195	−10.41%	
2020	565,763	1,545	193/195	−52.17%	
2019	1,182,817	3,240	193/195	−3.29%	
2018	1,222,993	3,350	192/195	−5.44%	
2017	1,293,320	3,543	192/195	−3.60%	
2016	1,341,565	3,665	192/195	−8.33%	
