= Tezozómoc metro station =

Mexico City metro station

Tezozómoc
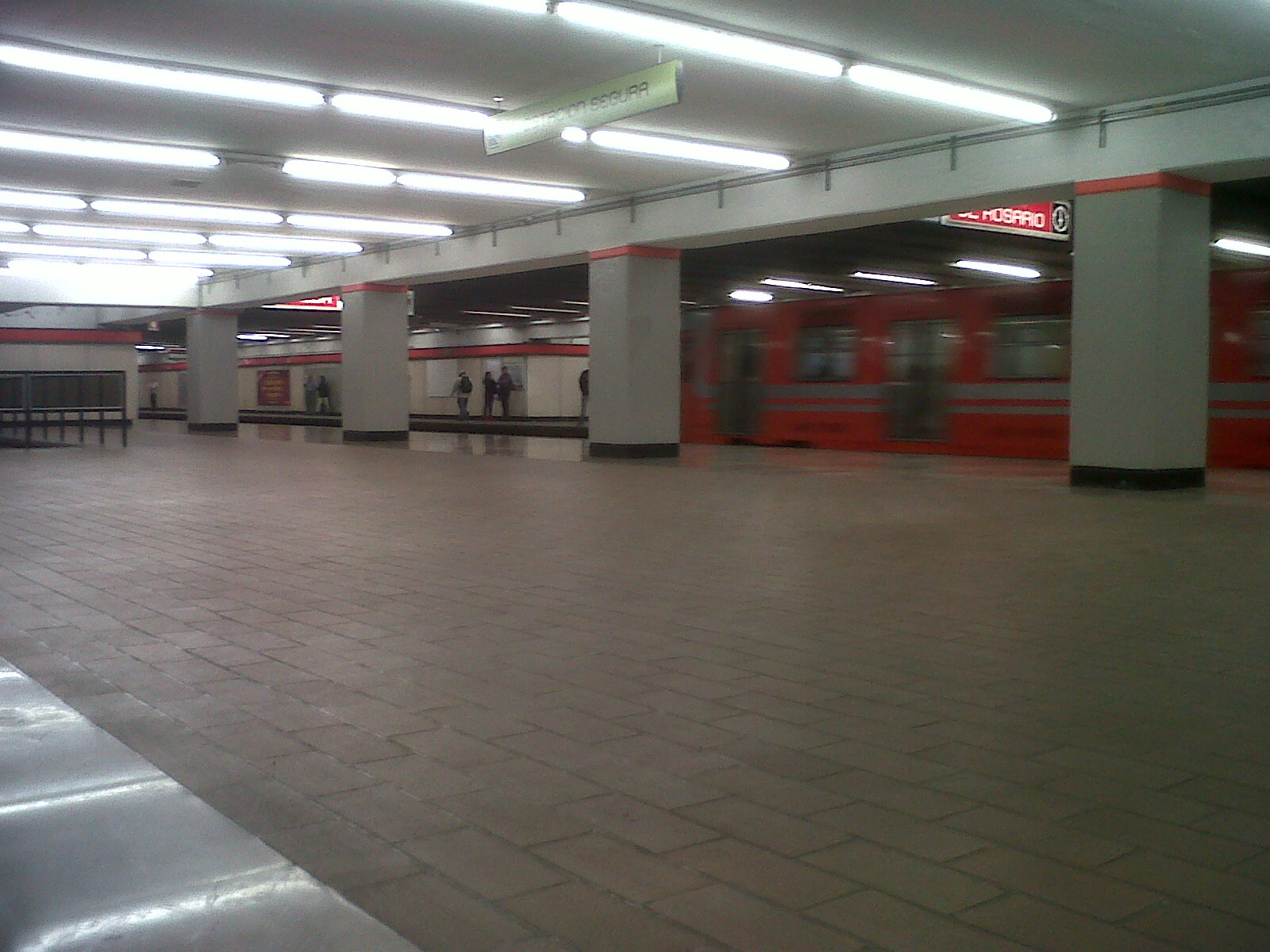

General information
- Location: Av. Sauces; Colonia Pasteros, Azcapotzalco; Mexico City; Mexico
- Coordinates: 19°29′42″N 99°11′47″W
- System: Mexico City Metro
- Operator: Sistema de Transporte Colectivo (STC)
- Platforms: 2 side platforms
- Tracks: 2

Construction
- Structure type: Underground
- Platform levels: 1
- Parking: No
- Cycle facilities: No

Other information
- Status: In service

History
- Opened: 21 December 1983; 42 years ago

Passengers
- 2025: 1,846,251 (Note: The data here is limited to the most recent ten years to avoid excessive listings; earlier figures can be found in this page's history or on the Mexico City Metro website. To calculate the average daily ridership, the annual total is divided by 365 days (366 in leap years), with decimals omitted from the result. Each station per line is ranked individually, as the system counts transfer stations separately. The percentage change is calculated automatically using the data from the current year and the previous year.) ▼2.12%
- Rank: 179/195

Services
Preceding station	Mexico City Metro	Following station
El Rosario Terminus	Line 6	Azcapotzalco toward Martín Carrera
Route map
Location
- Location within Mexico City
- Area map

Tezozómoc is a metro station on Mexico's Line 6. It is located in the Azcapotzalco borough. In 2019, the station had an average ridership of 5,757 passengers per day.

== General information ==
The station can be accessed through Ahuehuetes and Avenida Sauces Colonia Pasteros, in the Azcapotzalco borough. It has no underground direct connections, which means that, in order to exchange platforms, one has to exit the station and cross the street, thus making it necessary to pay the fare again, or reach one of the two neighboring stations and change platforms there (without paying extra), a feature only shared with Metro Allende in Line 2.

From 23 April to 16 June 2020, the station was temporarily closed due to the COVID-19 pandemic in Mexico.

=== Name and pictogram ===
The station's pictogram depicts King Tezozómoc, who ruled the Azcapotzalco altepetl for 80 years and it is also named in his honor.

=== Ridership ===
Annual passenger ridership
Year	Ridership	Average daily	Rank	% change	Ref.
2025	1,846,251	5,058	179/195	−2.12%
2024	1,886,169	5,153	169/195	+2.38%
2023	1,842,410	5,047	161/195	+12.77%
2022	1,633,705	4,475	161/195	+49.34%
2021	1,093,928	2,997	171/195	+7.49%
2020	1,017,673	2,780	186/195	−51.58%
2019	2,101,647	5,757	183/195	−0.46%
2018	2,111,277	5,784	183/195	+4.62%
2017	2,018,009	5,528	183/195	−0.65%
2016	2,031,143	5,549	182/195	−0.74%

== Exits ==
- North: Ahuehuetes Street and Avenida Sauces, Colonia Pasteros
- South: Ahuehuetes Street and Avenida Sauces, Colonia Pasteros

== Gallery ==
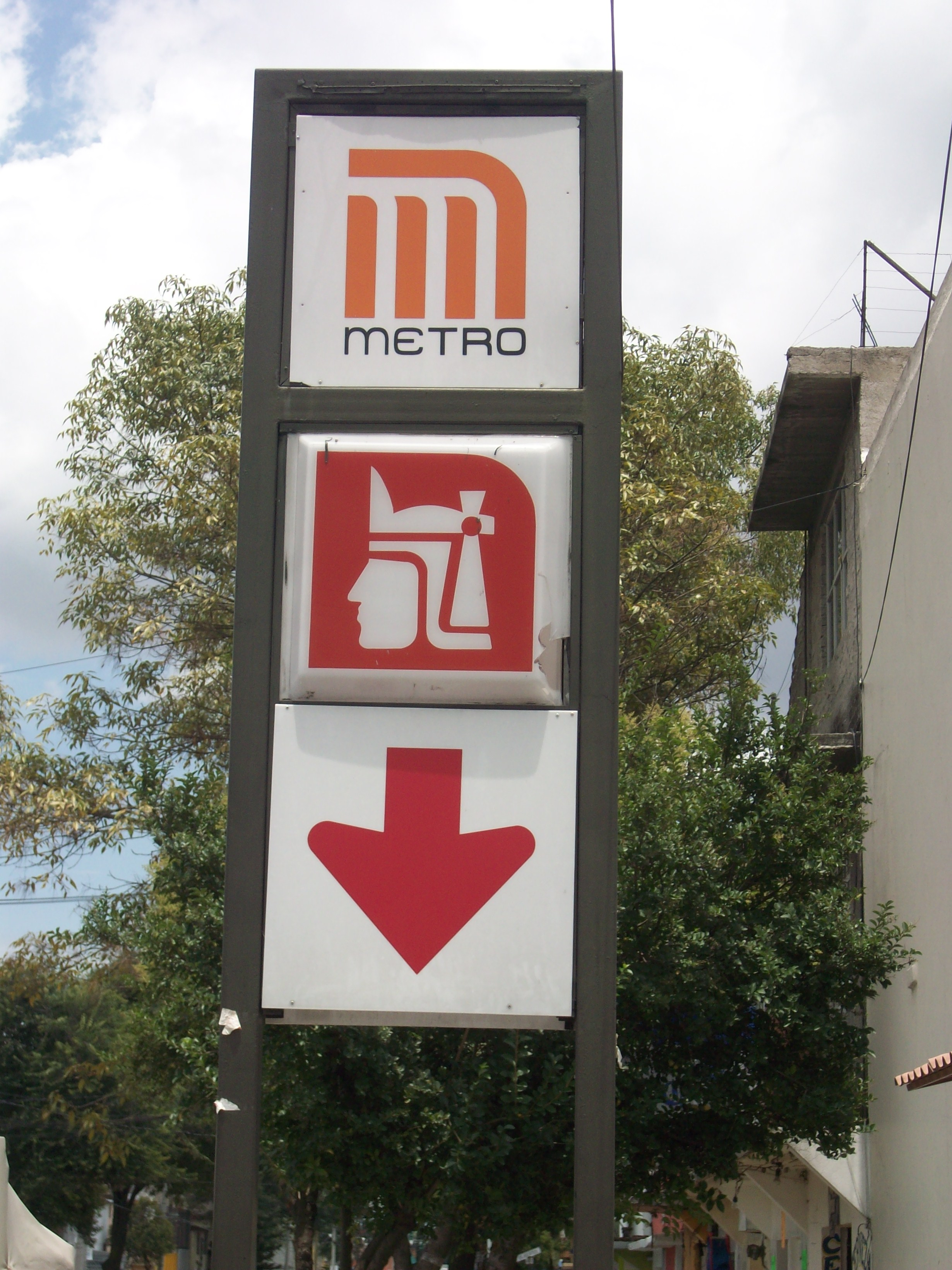
Entrance sign
