= La Villa-Basílica metro station =

Mexico City metro station

La Villa-Basílica
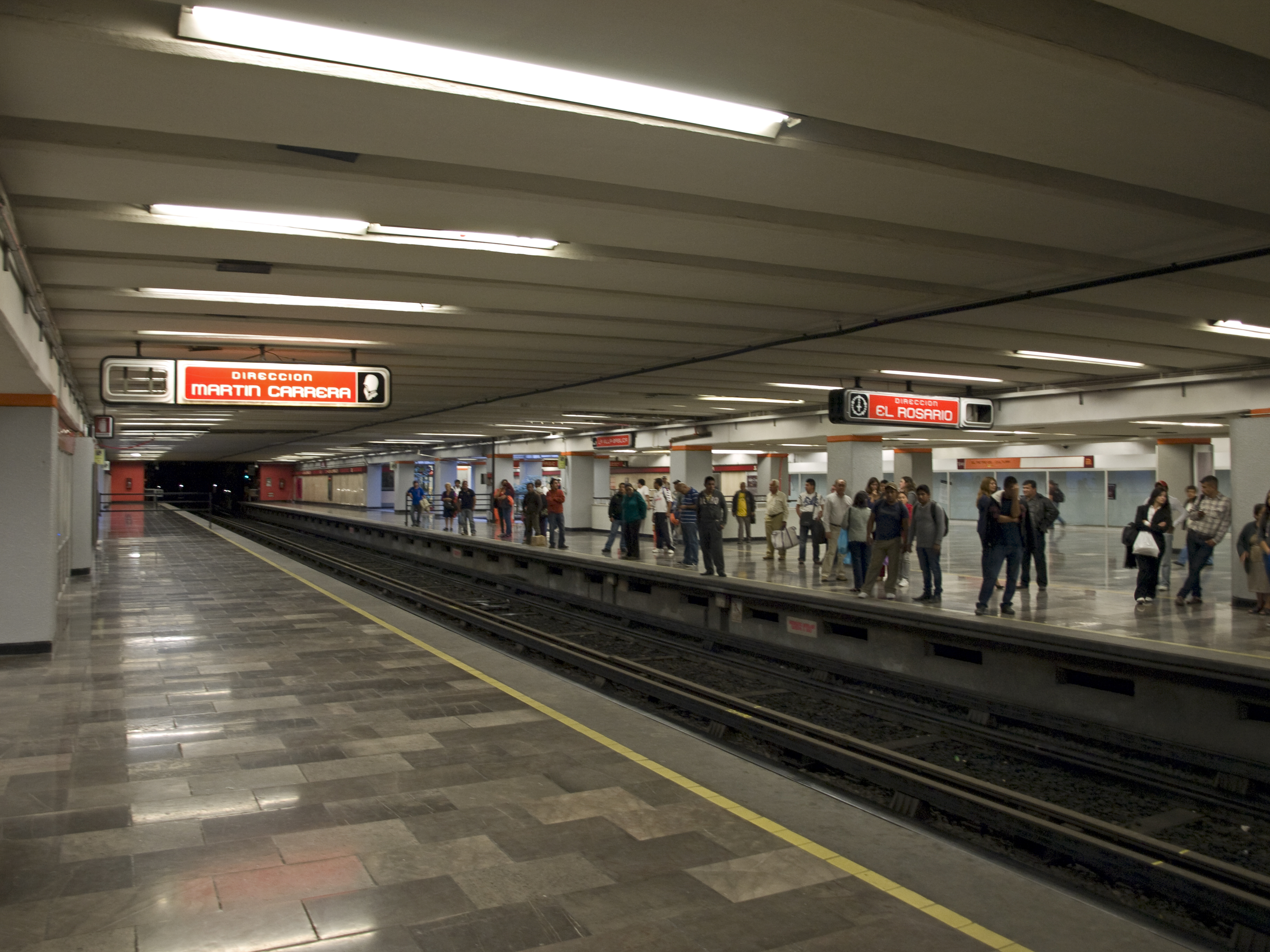
- Station platforms

General information
- Location: Mexico City; Mexico
- Coordinates: 19°28′53″N 99°07′05″W
- System: Mexico City Metro
- Operator: Sistema de Transporte Colectivo (STC)
- Platforms: 2 side platform
- Tracks: 2
- Connections: La Villa; Garrido

Construction
- Structure type: Underground

Other information
- Status: In service

History
- Opened: 8 July 1986; 40 years ago
- Former names: La Villa

Passengers
- 2025: 3,835,393 (Note: The data here is limited to the most recent ten years to avoid excessive listings; earlier figures can be found in this page's history or on the Mexico City Metro website. To calculate the average daily ridership, the annual total is divided by 365 days (366 in leap years), with decimals omitted from the result. Each station per line is ranked individually, as the system counts transfer stations separately. The percentage change is calculated automatically using the data from the current year and the previous year.) ▲1.29%
- Rank: 136/195

Services
Preceding station	Mexico City Metro	Following station
Deportivo 18 de Marzo toward El Rosario	Line 6	Martín Carrera Terminus
Route map
Location
- Location within Mexico City
- Area map

La Villa-Basílica (Spanish: Estación La Villa-Basílica) is station along Line 6 of the Mexico City Metro. Its logo consists of the façade of the nearby Basilica of Our Lady of Guadalupe on the left and a representation of the Virgin Mary as Our Lady of Guadalupe on the right.

The station serves the Colonia Aragón and Colonia La Villa neighborhoods. It opened on 8 July 1986.

== Ridership ==
Annual passenger ridership
Year	Ridership	Average daily	Rank	% change	Ref.
2025	3,835,393	10,507	136/195	+1.29%
2024	3,786,430	10,345	129/195	+0.97%
2023	3,750,014	10,274	119/195	+5.85%
2022	3,542,814	9,706	119/195	+54.51%
2021	2,292,984	6,282	129/195	−3.91%
2020	2,386,295	6,519	140/195	−56.14%
2019	5,440,130	14,904	121/195	−3.46%
2018	5,635,079	15,438	117/195	+0.19%
2017	5,624,559	15,409	113/195	−0.89%
2016	5,674,969	15,505	116/195	−3.08%
