= Colegio Guadalupe =

Colegio Guadalupe may refer to:

- Colegio Guadalupe (Argentina), a school run by the Society of the Divine Word
- Colegio Guadalupe (Mexico City)
- Colegio Nuestra Señora de Guadalupe, a high school in San Juan, Puerto Rico
- Colegio Nuestra Señora de Guadalupe, a school in Venezuela
- Primer Colegio Nacional Benemérito de la República Nuestra Señora de Guadalupe, a school in Peru
