= List of public transport routes numbered 6 =

In public transport, Route 6 may refer to:

- Route 6 (MTA Maryland), a bus route in Baltimore, Maryland
- Barcelona Metro line 6
- London Buses route 6
- Line 6 (Madrid Metro)
- Melbourne tram route 6
- 6 (New York City Subway service)
- Seoul Subway Line 6
- 6 Haight/Parnassus, a bus route in San Francisco
- Shanghai Metro Line 6

== See also ==
- Line 6 (disambiguation)
