= 6 Train =

6 Train can refer to:

- 6 (New York City Subway service)
- Paris Metro Line 6
- Line 6 (Beijing Subway)
- Line 6 (Shanghai Metro)

== See also ==
- Line 6 (disambiguation)
