= Colegio Guadalupe (Mexico City) =

Private school in Lindavista, Mexico City

Coordinates: 19.496935°N 99.128661°W

Colegio Guadalupe, S.C. is a private school in Lindavista, Gustavo A. Madero, Mexico City. It serves levels preschool through preparatoria (high school).
