= Mexico City Metro Line 6 =

Metro line in Mexico City

Line 6

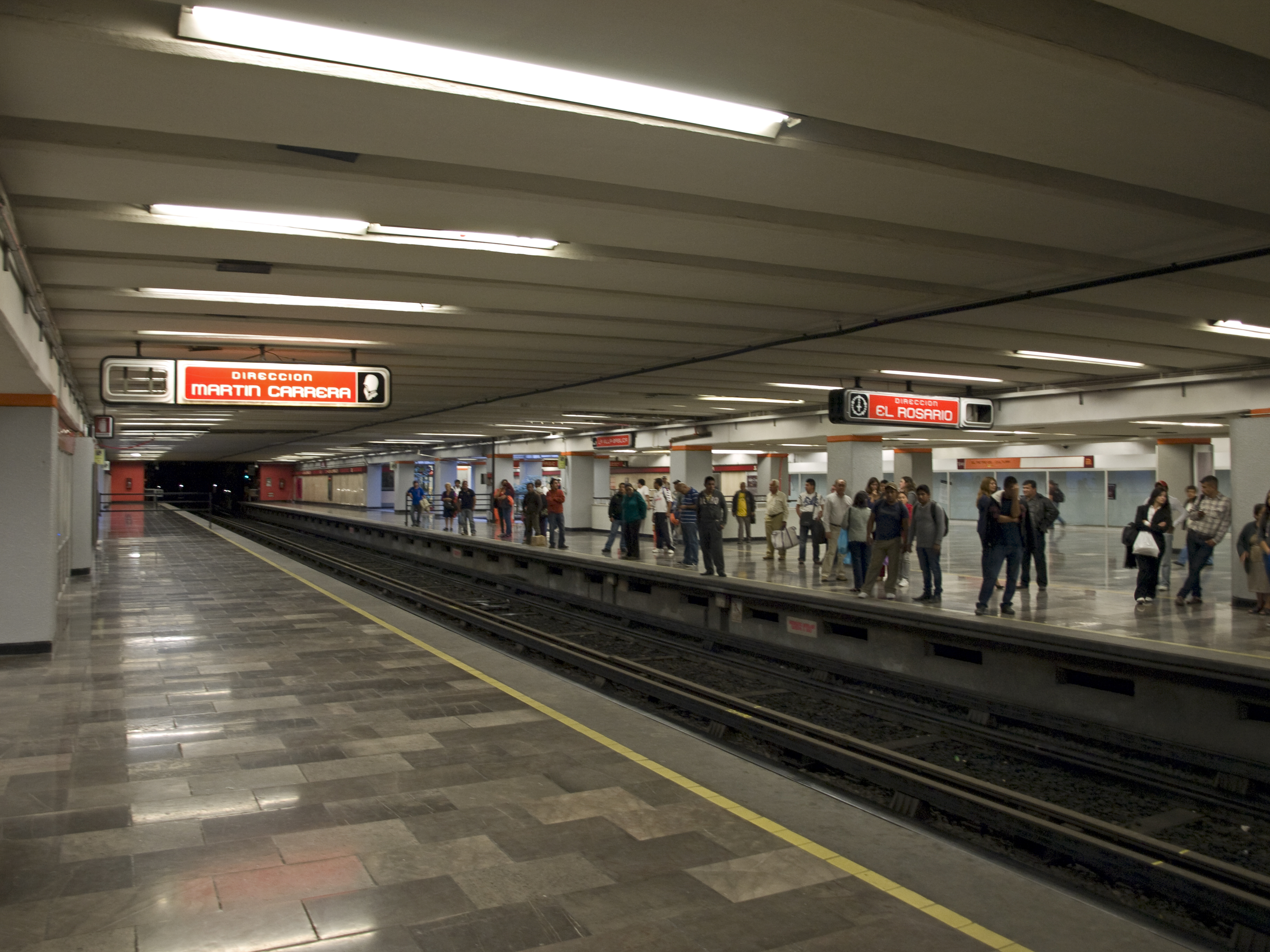
- La Villa-Basílica station

Overview
- Locale: Mexico City
- Termini: El Rosario; Martín Carrera
- Connecting lines: at El Rosario; at Instituto del Petróleo; at Deportivo 18 de Marzo; at Martín Carrera
- Stations: 11
- Website: metro.cdmx.gob.mx

Service
- Type: Rapid transit
- System: Mexico City Metro
- Operator(s): Sistema de Transporte Colectivo (STC)
- Rolling stock: NM-73, NM-79
- Ridership: 38,808,804 (2024)

History
- Opened: 21 December 1983; 42 years ago
- Last extension: 1986

Technical
- Line length: 11.434 km (7.1 mi)
- Track length: 13.947 km (8.7 mi)
- Number of tracks: 2
- Track gauge: 1,435 mm (4 ft 8 1/2 in) standard gauge with roll ways along track
- Electrification: Guide bar, 750 V DC
Route map
Line 6 route highlighted in gray

Mexico City Metro Line 6 is one of the twelve metro lines operating in Mexico City, Mexico. Its distinctive color is red. It was the sixth line to be opened.

The line was inaugurated in 1983 and it runs from northwest to northeastern Mexico City. Line 6 has 11 stations and a length of 13.947 km (8.666 mi), out of which 11.434 km (7.105 mi) are for service.

Line 6 is the second line in the entire Mexico City Metro network with least passengers, having 23,533,445 users in 2021.

== History ==
Line 6 was opened on 21 December 1983, in the section that goes from El Rosario, serving the estate Unidad Habitacional El Rosario -the biggest estate in the country, to Instituto del Petróleo. The latter became the first transfer station when it was connected to the already existing station of Line 5.

Three years later, on 8 July 1986, the second stretch of the line was inaugurated: from Instituto del Petróleo to Martín Carrera, connecting with Line 4.

According to the Mexico City Metro Plan published in 2018 by the Sistema de Transporte Colectivo, Line 6 would be expanded from Martín Carrera eastbound towards Villa de Aragón station of Line B. This extension would have a length of 5.69 km (3.54 mi) and five new stations.

== Chronology ==
- 21 December 1983: from El Rosario to Instituto del Petróleo
- 8 July 1986: from Instituto del Petróleo to Martín Carrera

== Rolling stock ==
Line 6 has had different types of rolling stock throughout the years.

- Alstom MP-68: 1983–1994
- Concarril NM-73: 1983–present
- Concarril NM-79: 2015–present

As of 2020, out of the 390 trains in the Mexico City Metro network, 17 are in service in Line 6.

== Station list ==
Key (Note: The following list was adapted from different websites and official maps.: Metro connections obtained from the official Mexico City Metro system map.; Accessibility obtained from the Mexico City Metro system map. In some cases, the map omits the accessibility icon as the station(s) are actually partially accessible. However, the respective websites of each station on the official site indicate the respective accessibility methods. Stations with the symbol ‡ are fully accessible; stations with the symbol † are partially accessible.; Cablebús obtained from their official website.; Centro de transferencia modal (CETRAM;) obtained from the official website of the Órgano Regulador de Transporte.; Ecobici obtained from their official website.; Metrobús obtained from the Mexico City Metrobús system map.; Mexibús obtained from the official Mexico City Metro system map.; Mexicable obtained from the official Mexico City Metro system map.; Public buses network (peseros) obtained from the official website of the Órgano Regulador de Transporte.; Red de Transporte de Pasajeros obtained from their official website.; Trolleybuses obtained from their official website.)
Handicapped/disabled access	Fully accessible station	Cablebús Line {{{3}}}	Cablebús connection	Red de Transporte de Pasajeros	RTP connection
Handicapped/disabled access	Partially accessible station	Mexibús	Mexibús connection	Tren Interurbano	Tren Interurbano connection
Transfer hub	CETRAM transfer station	Mexicable	Mexicable connection	Tren Suburbano	Tren Suburbano connection
Transfer hub	ETRAM transfer station	Mexico City Metro	Mexico City Metro connection	Trolleybus	Trolleybus connection
Ecobici	Ecobici bikeshare	Mexico City minubus	Pesero connection	Xochimilco Light Rail	Xochimilco Light Rail connection

The stations from west to east:

Station	Handicapped/disabled access	Opened	Level	Distance (km)		Connections	Location
Station	Handicapped/disabled access	Opened	Level	Between stations	Total	Connections	Location
El Rosario	Handicapped/disabled access	December 21, 1983	Grade-level	—N/a	0.0	Line V (in planning); 19, 19A, 59, 59A, 107	Azcapotzalco
Tezozómoc		December 21, 1983	Underground	1.4	1.4		Azcapotzalco
UAM-Azcapotzalco		December 21, 1983	Underground	1.1	2.5	59A, 107, 107B	Azcapotzalco
Ferrería/Arena Ciudad de México		December 21, 1983	Underground	1.3	3.8	(at Fortuna); 19, 19A, 107B	Azcapotzalco
Norte 45		December 21, 1983	Underground	1.2	5.0	15A	Azcapotzalco
Vallejo		December 21, 1983	Underground	0.8	5.8	(at Poniente 128)	Azcapotzalco
Instituto del Petróleo		December 21, 1983	Underground	1.0	6.8	(at distance); 23, 27A, 103	Gustavo A. Madero
Lindavista	Handicapped/disabled access	July 8, 1986	Underground	1.4	8.2	104	Gustavo A. Madero
Deportivo 18 de Marzo	Handicapped/disabled access	July 8, 1986	Underground	1.2	9.4	15B, Z1R, Z1S, Z1T, Z1U	Gustavo A. Madero
La Villa-Basílica		July 8, 1986	Underground	0.7	10.1	(at Garrido); 25, 101A, 101B, 101D, 107B; (at Ricarte); 15B	Gustavo A. Madero
Martín Carrera		July 8, 1986	Underground	1.3	11.4	33, 37; 5A	Gustavo A. Madero

== Ridership ==
The following table shows each of Line 6 stations total and average daily ridership during 2019.

†	Transfer station
†‡	Transfer station and terminal

Rank	Station	Total ridership	Average daily
1	Martín Carrera†‡	11,038,852	30,243
2	Ferrería/Arena Ciudad de México	8,679,563	23,780
3	Lindavista	6,525,784	17,879
4	El Rosario†‡	5,864,983	16,068
5	La Villa-Basílica	5,440,130	14,904
6	UAM-Azcapotzalco	2,947,847	8,076
7	Vallejo	2,922,747	8,008
8	Norte 45	2,597,226	7,116
9	Tezozómoc	2,101,647	5,758
10	Instituto del Petróleo†	1,182,817	3,241
11	Deportivo 18 de Marzo†	644,226	1,765
Total		49,945,822	136,838

== Tourism ==
Line 6 passes near several places of interest:

- Mexico City Arena, an indoor arena used to host concerts, sports, and other events.
- Basilica of Our Lady of Guadalupe, basilica and national shrine of Mexico.

== See also ==
- List of Mexico City Metro lines
