= Lindavista =

Coordinates: 19.49411°N 99.12762°W

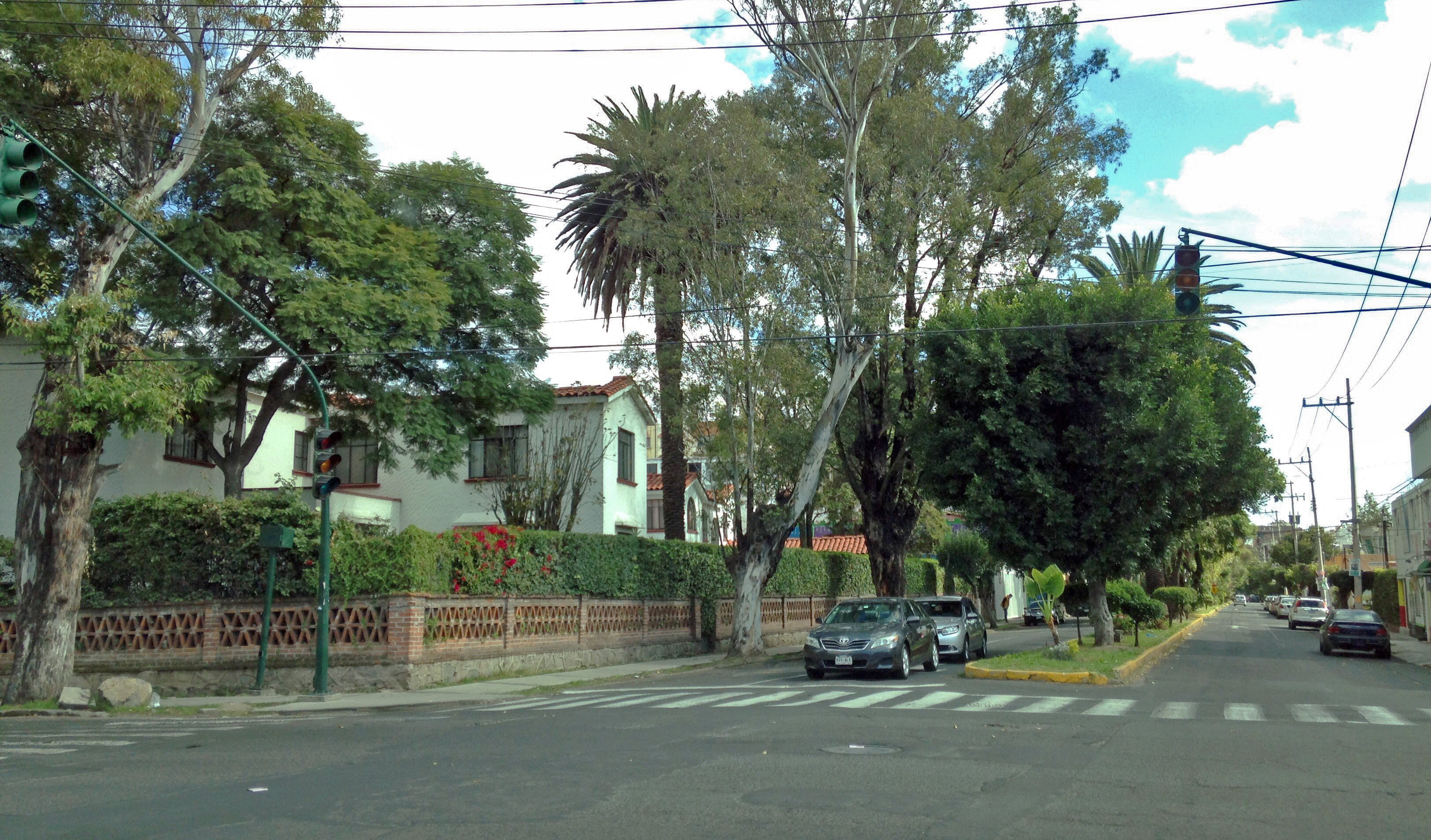
Riobamba and Sierravista street intersection

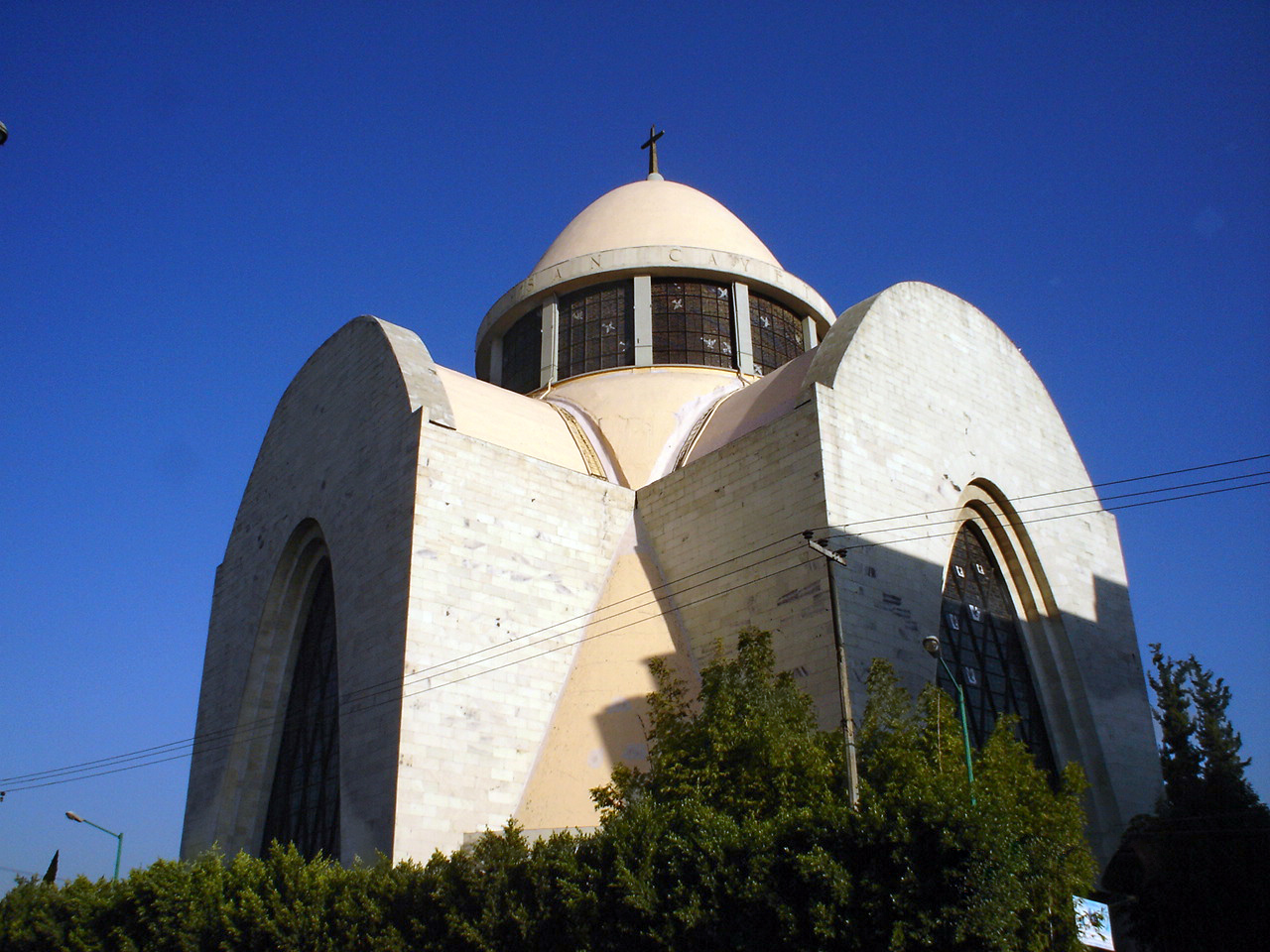
Saint Cajetan Church in Lindavista

Lindavista is a neighbourhood in the north of Mexico City, in the administrative district of Gustavo A. Madero. The streets in Lindavista are named after cities in Latin America.

== History ==
It was founded in 1932 as a result of the planned growth of the city and of the neighbouring suburb of Industrial.

== Education ==
- Insurgentes campus of the Sistema Educativo Justo Sierra
- Colegio Guadalupe
- Instituto Ovalle Monday S. C. - Has its elementary campuses, Primaria Torres Lindavista and Primaria Latacunga, in Lindavista
