= Mexico City Metrobús Line 6 =

Bus route in Mexico City

Metrobús Line 6
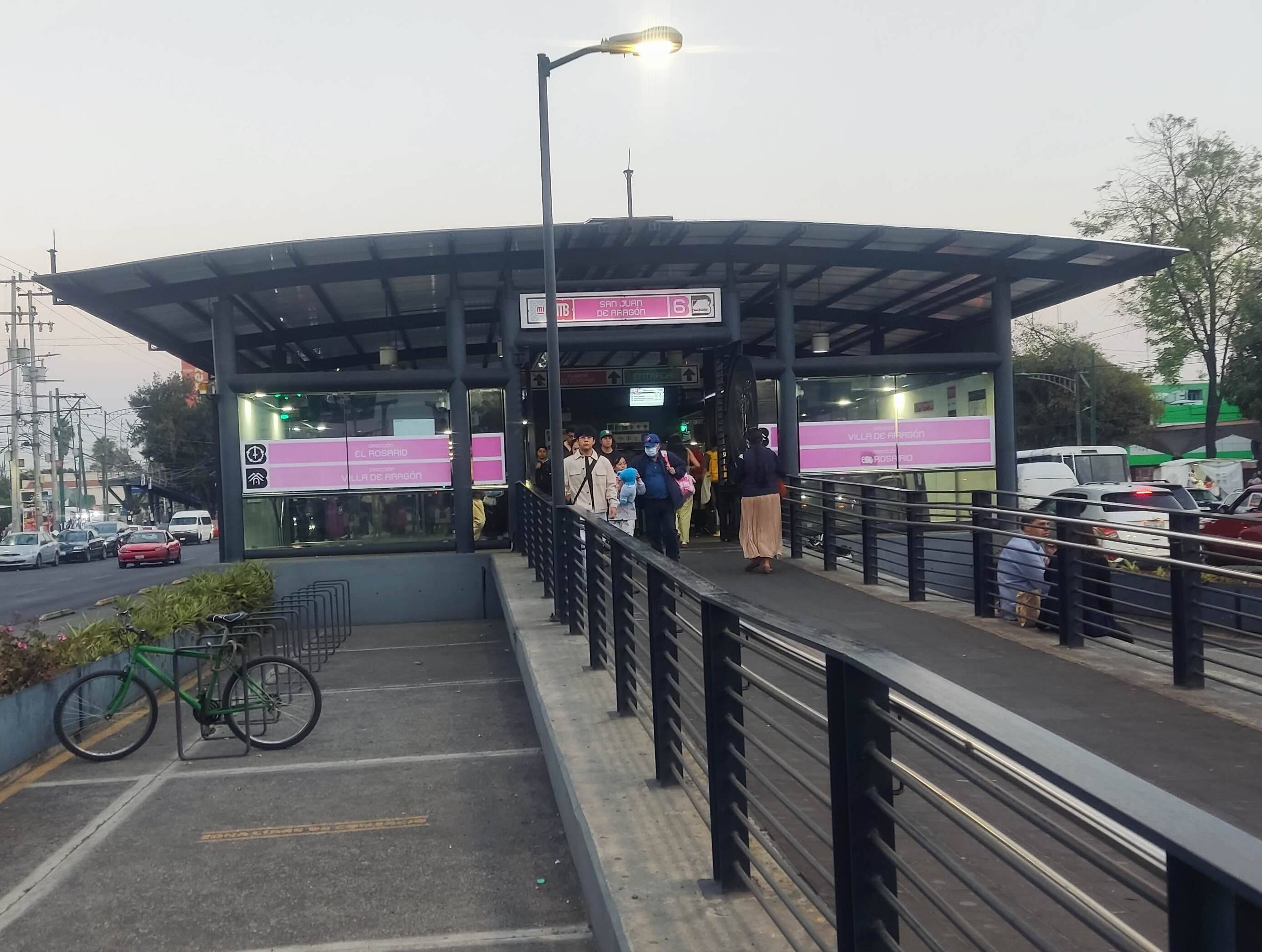
- San Juan de Aragón station

Overview
- Status: In service
- Termini: El Rosario; Villa de Aragón
- Stations: 37
- Website: Línea 6

Service
- Type: Bus rapid transit
- System: Mexico City Metrobus
- Services: 3
- Operator(s): See Operators
- Daily ridership: 150,000

History
- Opened: January 21, 2016; 10 years ago

Technical
- Line length: 20 km (12.4 mi)
- Character: Exclusive right-of-way

The Mexico City Metrobús Line 6 is a bus rapid transit line in the Mexico City Metrobus. It operates between El Rosario in the municipality of Azcapotzalco, in northern Mexico City, and Villa de Aragón in Gustavo A. Madero, in the eastern limits of the city with the municipality of Ecatepec de Morelos in the State of Mexico, Mexico.

Line 6 has a total of 37 stations and a length of 20 kilometers (12.4 mi), which runs from northwestern to eastern Mexico City.

Construction of Line 6 started on August 6, 2014 and it was inaugurated on January 21, 2016 by Miguel Ángel Mancera, Head of Government of the Federal District from 2012 to 2018.

== Service description ==
=== Services ===
The line has three itineraries:

Villa de Aragón – El Rosario
	Monday– Friday	Saturday	Sunday
to El Rosario
First Bus	04:20	04:30	05:00
Last Bus	00:18	00:20	00:18
to Villa de Aragón
First Bus	04:22	04:21	05:00
Last Bus	00:17	00:13	00:17

Villa de Aragón – Instituto Politécnico Nacional
	Monday– Friday	Saturday	Sunday
from Villa de Aragón
First Bus	04:30	04:45	no service
Last Bus	22:00	22:16	no service
to Villa de Aragón
First Bus	04:37	04:55	no service
Last Bus	22:40	22:26	no service

Deportivo 18 de Marzo – El Rosario
	Monday– Friday	Saturday	Sunday
to El Rosario
First Bus	04:30	no service	
Last Bus	22:15	no service	
from El Rosario
First Bus	04:24	no service	
Last Bus	23:36	no service	

Line 6 serves the municipalities of Azcapotzalco and Gustavo A. Madero.

=== Station list ===
Key (Note: The following list was adapted from different websites and official maps.: Metro connections obtained from the official Mexico City Metro system map.; Accessibility obtained from the Mexico City Metro system map. In some cases, the map omits the accessibility icon as the station(s) are actually partially accessible. However, the respective websites of each station on the official site indicate the respective accessibility methods. Stations with the symbol ‡ are fully accessible; stations with the symbol † are partially accessible.; Cablebús obtained from their official website.; Centro de transferencia modal (CETRAM;) obtained from the official website of the Órgano Regulador de Transporte.; Ecobici obtained from their official website.; Metrobús obtained from the Mexico City Metrobús system map.; Mexibús obtained from the official Mexico City Metro system map.; Mexicable obtained from the official Mexico City Metro system map.; Public buses network (peseros) obtained from the official website of the Órgano Regulador de Transporte.; Red de Transporte de Pasajeros obtained from their official website.; Trolleybuses obtained from their official website.)
Handicapped/disabled access	Fully accessible station	Cablebús Line {{{3}}}	Cablebús connection	Red de Transporte de Pasajeros	RTP connection
Handicapped/disabled access	Partially accessible station	Mexibús	Mexibús connection	Tren Interurbano	Tren Interurbano connection
Transfer hub	CETRAM transfer station	Mexicable	Mexicable connection	Tren Suburbano	Tren Suburbano connection
Transfer hub	ETRAM transfer station	Mexico City Metro	Mexico City Metro connection	Trolleybus	Trolleybus connection
Ecobici	Ecobici bikeshare	Mexico City minubus	Pesero connection	Xochimilco Light Rail	Xochimilco Light Rail connection

Station (Note: All the stations are fully accessible to people with disabilities.)	Connections	Neighborhood(s)	Borough	Picture	Date opened
El Rosario	Line 5 (under construction); 19, 19A, 59, 59A, 107; Various local and intercity bus routes	Unidad Habitacional El Rosario	Azcapotzalco		January 21, 2016
Colegio de Bachilleres 1	Line 5 (under construction); 19, 19A, 59, 59A, 107	Unidad Habitacional El Rosario	Azcapotzalco		January 21, 2016
De las Culturas	19, 19A, 107	Unidad Habitacional El Rosario; San Martín Xochinahuac	Azcapotzalco		January 21, 2016
Ferrocarriles Nacionales	19, 19A	San Martín Xochinahuac	Azcapotzalco		January 21, 2016
UAM Azcapotzalco	19, 19A, 107, 107B	San Martín Xochinahuac; Santa Bárbara	Azcapotzalco		January 21, 2016
Tecnoparque	19, 19A, 107B	Santa Bárbara	Azcapotzalco		January 21, 2016
Norte 59		Industrial Vallejo	Azcapotzalco		January 21, 2016
Norte 45		Industrial Vallejo	Azcapotzalco		January 21, 2016
Montevideo	Mexico City Metrobús Mexico City Metrobús Line 3	Industrial Vallejo; Nueva Vallejo	Azcapotzalco, Gustavo A. Madero		January 21, 2016
Lindavista-Vallejo	(at Instituto del Petróleo); (at Montevideo); 23, 27A, 103	Nueva Vallejo; Lindavista Vallejo	Gustavo A. Madero		January 21, 2016
Instituto del Petróleo	(at Montevideo); 23, 27A, 103	Lindavista Vallejo; San Bartolo Atepehuacán	Gustavo A. Madero		January 21, 2016
San Bartolo		San Bartolo Atepehuacán; Lindavista Sur	Gustavo A. Madero		January 21, 2016
Instituto Politécnico Nacional	25, 104	Lindavista Sur	Gustavo A. Madero		January 21, 2016
Riobamba		Lindavista Sur	Gustavo A. Madero		January 21, 2016
Deportivo 18 de Marzo	15B; Various intercity bus routes	Tepeyac Insurgentes	Gustavo A. Madero		January 21, 2016
La Villa	(at La Villa-Basílica); (at Garrido); (at Garrido); 25, 101A, 101B, 101D, 107B; 15B (at distance)	Tepeyac Insurgentes	Gustavo A. Madero		January 21, 2016
De los Misterios (Note: Accessible from Villa de Aragón to El Rosario.)	(at Av. Montevideo); 101A, 101B, 101D, 107B	Tepeyac Insurgentes; Villa Gustavo A. Madero	Gustavo A. Madero		January 21, 2016
Hospital Infantil La Villa	Line 7; 101A, 101B, 101D, 107B	Villa Gustavo A. Madero; Estanzuela	Gustavo A. Madero		January 21, 2016
Delegación Gustavo A. Madero	(at Cuauhtémoc); 107B	Villa Gustavo A. Madero; Martín Carrera	Gustavo A. Madero		January 21, 2016
Martín Carrera	33, 37; 5A; Various intercity bus routes	Constitución de la República; Granjas Modernas	Gustavo A. Madero		January 21, 2016
Hospital General La Villa		Constitución de la República; Granjas Modernas	Gustavo A. Madero		January 21, 2016
San Juan de Aragón	(at Gran Canal)	Constitución de la República; Granjas Modernas; DM Nacional	Gustavo A. Madero		January 21, 2016
Gran Canal		DM Nacional; Amp. Casas Alemán	Gustavo A. Madero		January 21, 2016
Casas Alemán		Ampliación Casas Alemán; Héroes de Chapultepec	Gustavo A. Madero		January 21, 2016
Pueblo San Juan de Aragón		Pueblo San Juan de Aragón	Gustavo A. Madero		January 21, 2016
Loreto Fabela	15B, 15C	Pueblo San Juan de Aragón; San Juan de Aragón	Gustavo A. Madero		January 21, 2016
482 (Note: Accessible from El Rosario to Villa de Aragón.)	15C	San Juan de Aragón	Gustavo A. Madero		January 21, 2016
414		San Juan de Aragón	Gustavo A. Madero		January 21, 2016
416 Oriente		San Juan de Aragón	Gustavo A. Madero		January 21, 2016
416 Poniente	43; 15B	Ampliación Casas Alemán; San Juan de Aragón	Gustavo A. Madero		January 21, 2016
Deportivo Los Galeana	43; 15B	Ampliación Casas Alemán; San Juan de Aragón	Gustavo A. Madero		January 21, 2016
Ampliación Providencia		Providencia; San Juan de Aragón	Gustavo A. Madero		January 21, 2016
Volcán de Fuego		Ampliación Providencia; San Juan de Aragón	Gustavo A. Madero		January 21, 2016
La Pradera		La Pradera; San Juan de Aragón	Gustavo A. Madero		January 21, 2016
Colegio de Bachilleres 9		La Pradera; San Juan de Aragón	Gustavo A. Madero		January 21, 2016
Francisco Morazán		Villa de Aragón; San Juan de Aragón	Gustavo A. Madero		January 21, 2016
Villa de Aragón	15A, 15C; Various intercity bus routes	Villa de Aragón; San Juan de Aragón	Gustavo A. Madero		January 21, 2016

== Operators ==
Corredor Antenas-Rosario, SA de CV (CARSA) is the sole operator of Line 6.
