= El Rosario metro station =

Mexico City metro station

El Rosario
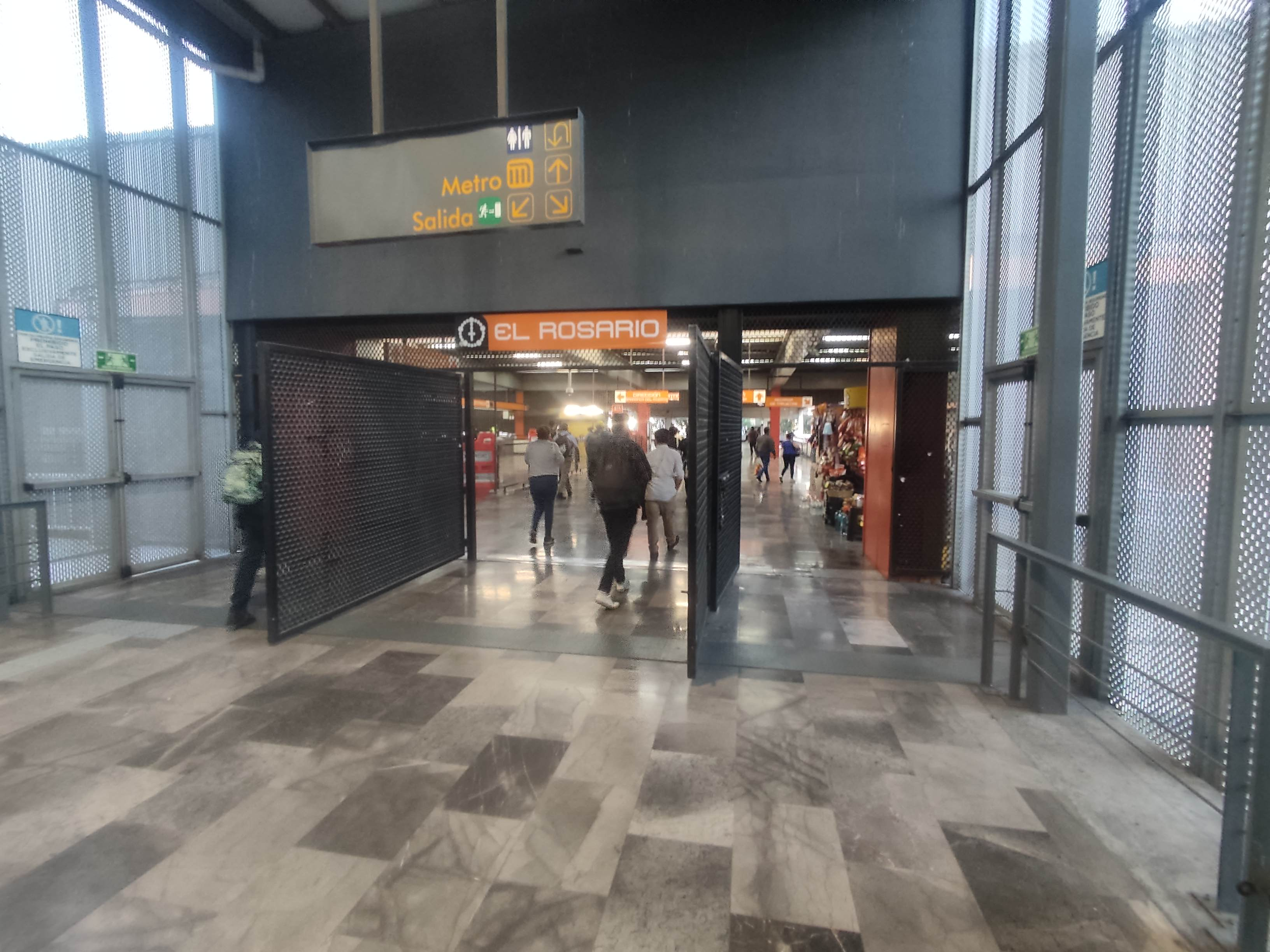
- Main entrance

General information
- Location: El Rosario, Azcapotzalco; Mexico City; Mexico
- Coordinates: 19°30′16″N 99°12′00″W
- System: Mexico City Metro
- Operator: Sistema de Transporte Colectivo (STC)
- Platforms: 4 island platforms
- Tracks: 6
- Connections: El Rosario; El Rosario (under construction)

Construction
- Structure type: At grade
- Parking: No
- Cycle facilities: Yes
- Accessible: Yes

Other information
- Status: In service

History
- Opened: 21 December 1983; 42 years ago 29 November 1988; 37 years ago

Passengers
- 2025: Total: 14,852,448; 5,038,702 (Note: The data here is limited to the most recent ten years to avoid excessive listings; earlier figures can be found in this page's history or on the Mexico City Metro website. To calculate the average daily ridership, the annual total is divided by 365 days (366 in leap years), with decimals omitted from the result. Each station per line is ranked individually, as the system counts transfer stations separately. The percentage change is calculated automatically using the data from the current year and the previous year.); 9,813,746 ▲2.07%
- Rank: 102/195; 31/195

Services
Preceding station	Mexico City Metro	Following station
Terminus	Line 6	Tezozómoc toward Martín Carrera
Terminus	Line 7	Aquiles Serdán toward Barranca del Muerto
Route map
Location
- Location within Mexico City
- Area map

El Rosario (Spanish: Estación El Rosario) is an at-grade station on the Mexico City Metro. It is located in Azcapotzalco borough, in the northern reaches of Mexico City. It serves as the terminal for both Lines 6 and 7.

== General information ==
The station logo depicts a set of rosary beads.

The platforms for Lines 6 and 7 are at the same level, separated only by a bridge. This terminal, like many others, is multimodal, connecting to other modes of transport. Metro El Rosario connects with suburban buses that serve municipalities such as Cuautitlán Izcalli and Lechería, in neighboring Mexico State. It also connects with trolleybus Line "I", which runs between El Rosario and Metro Chapultepec.

This terminal was part of an intercity railway project, serving zones between El Rosario and Huehuetoca. Construction work on this railway line began in the 1990s, but it was never finished. Today some tracks and stations still remain.

=== Ridership ===
Annual passenger ridership (Line 6)
Year	Ridership	Average daily	Rank	% change	Ref.
2025	5,038,702	13,804	102/195	−2.40%
2024	5,162,525	14,105	88/195	+3.86%
2023	4,970,665	13,618	96/195	+8.40%
2022	4,585,692	12,563	93/195	+53.69%
2021	2,983,811	8,174	110/195	−10.44%
2020	3,331,663	9,102	110/195	−43.19%
2019	5,864,983	16,068	112/195	−7.08%
2018	6,311,614	17,292	105/195	+2.88%
2017	6,134,797	16,807	108/195	−2.93%
2016	6,319,904	17,267	105/195	−10.03%

Annual passenger ridership (Line 7)
Year	Ridership	Average daily	Rank	% change	Ref.
2025	9,813,746	26,886	31/195	+4.52%
2024	9,389,267	25,653	33/195	+7.90%
2023	8,701,870	23,840	32/195	+9.71%
2022	7,931,510	21,730	34/195	+27.00%
2021	6,245,113	17,109	34/195	−12.15%
2020	7,108,556	19,422	31/195	−44.43%
2019	12,792,425	35,047	27/195	−3.38%
2018	13,240,097	32,224	24/195	−0.36%
2017	13,287,373	36,403	24/195	−5.25%
2016	14,023,384	38,315	24/195	+2.38%

== Nearby ==
- Parque Tezozómoc, park.
- Unidad Habitacional El Rosario, estate.

== Exits ==
=== Line 6 ===
- East: Tierra Colorada street and Avenida El Rosario, El Rosario
- West: Tierra Colorada street and Avenida El Rosario, El Rosario

=== Line 7 ===
- North: Tierra Caliente street and Avenida El Rosario, Colonia Tierra Nueva
- South: Tierra Caliente street and Tres Culturas avenue, Colonia Tierra Nueva
