= Martín Carrera metro station =

Mexico City metro station

Martín Carrera
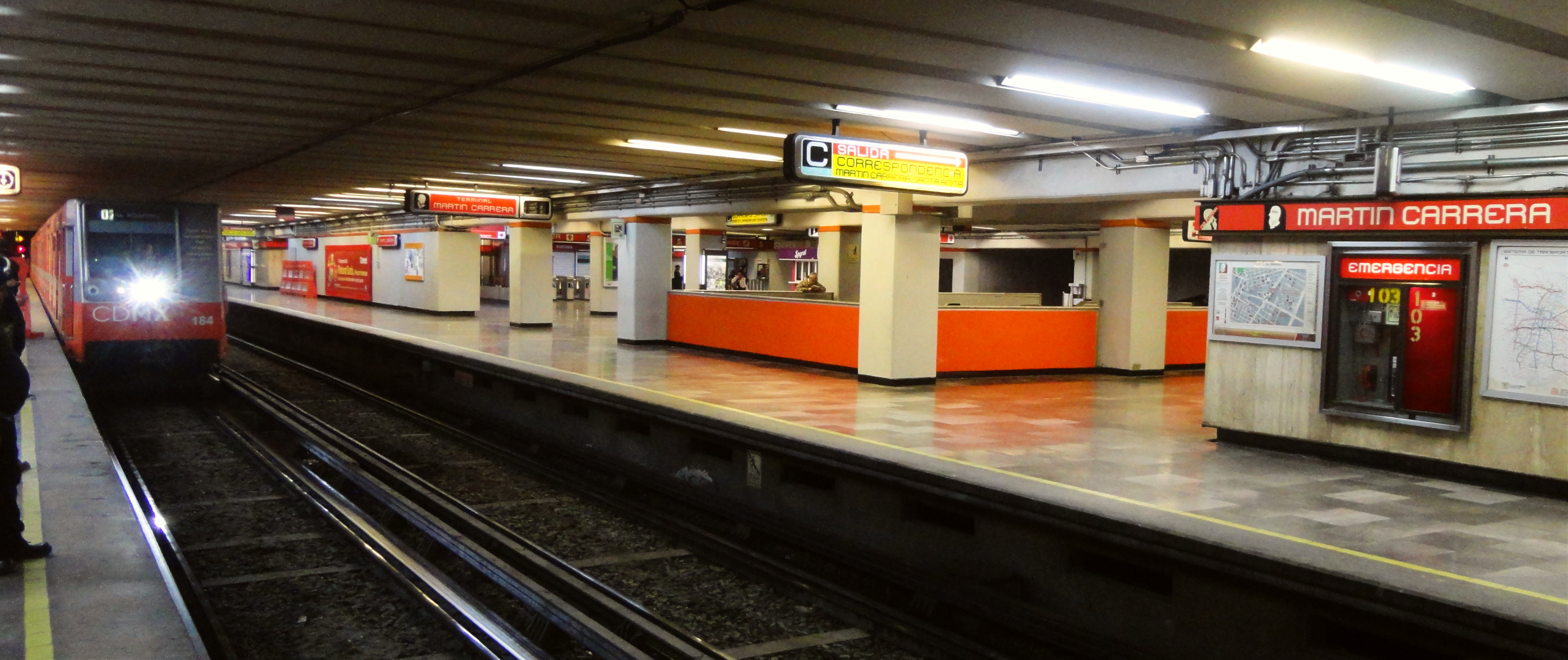
- Line 6 station in December 2019

General information
- Location: Mexico City; Mexico
- Coordinates: 19°29′06″N 99°06′16″W
- System: Mexico City Metro
- Operator: Sistema de Transporte Colectivo (STC)
- Platforms: 4 side platforms
- Tracks: 4
- Connections: Martín Carrera

Construction
- Structure type: At grade Underground

Other information
- Status: In service

History
- Opened: 29 August 1981; 44 years ago 8 July 1986; 40 years ago

Passengers
- 2025: Total: 15,349,914; 7,456,138 (Note: The data here is limited to the most recent ten years to avoid excessive listings; earlier figures can be found in this page's history or on the Mexico City Metro website. To calculate the average daily ridership, the annual total is divided by 365 days (366 in leap years), with decimals omitted from the result. Each station per line is ranked individually, as the system counts transfer stations separately. The percentage change is calculated automatically using the data from the current year and the previous year.); 7,893,776 ▼0.34%
- Rank: 54/195; 48/195

Services
Preceding station	Mexico City Metro	Following station
Terminus	Line 4	Talismán toward Santa Anita
La Villa-Basílica toward El Rosario	Line 6	Terminus
Route map
Location
- Location within Mexico City
- Area map

Martín Carrera is a station on the Mexico City Metro. It is located at the borders of the Colonia Martín Carrera, Colonia 15 de Agosto, and Colonia Díaz Mirón districts in the Gustavo A. Madero borough, in the north of Mexico City. The station logo depicts a bust of General Martín Carrera, a national hero who fought in the Mexican–American War of 1846–48.

== General information ==
Martín Carrera is both a terminal station and a transfer station, linking Lines 4 and 6, both of which terminate here. Like other terminal stations on the network, this one is multimodal: it connects with suburban bus lines that serve areas including Cerro Gordo, Vía Morelos, and others across the state line of the State of Mexico. The station also connects with trolleybus line "LL", which runs between the San Felipe de Jesús neighbourhood and Metro Hidalgo. The station is near the Basílica de Guadalupe, a Roman Catholic shrine and place of pilgrimage.

The station was opened with the others along the northern portion of Line 4 on 29 August 1981. Service along Line 6 started on 8 July 1986.

== Ridership ==
Annual passenger ridership (Line 4)
Year	Ridership	Average daily	Rank	% change	Ref.
2025	7,456,138	20,427	54/195	+4.17%
2024	7,157,992	19,557	51/195	+5.69%
2023	6,772,676	18,855	65/195	+11.34%
2022	6,083,116	16,666	62/195	+57.18%
2021	3,870,053	10,602	77/195	−10.54%
2020	4,325,824	11,819	81/195	−36.55%
2019	6,818,051	18,679	94/195	−19.10%
2018	8,427,289	23,088	68/195	−4.15%
2017	8,791,991	24,087	59/195	−2.18%
2016	8,988,150	24,557	60/195	+0.44%

Annual passenger ridership (Line 6)
Year	Ridership	Average daily	Rank	% change	Ref.
2025	7,893,776	21,626	48/195	−2.32%
2024	8,080,888	22,078	43/195	−6.35%
2023	8,628,975	23,641	36/195	+12.31%
2022	7,683,190	21,049	39/195	+42.81%
2021	5,380,137	14,740	44/195	−12.50%
2020	6,149,003	16,800	41/195	−44.30%
2019	11,038,852	30,243	42/195	+1.69%
2018	10,855,147	29,740	44/195	+7.32%
2017	10,114,832	27,711	49/195	+6.16%
2016	9,527,638	26,031	53/195	−17.51%
