= Misterios metro station =

Mexico City Metro station

Misterios
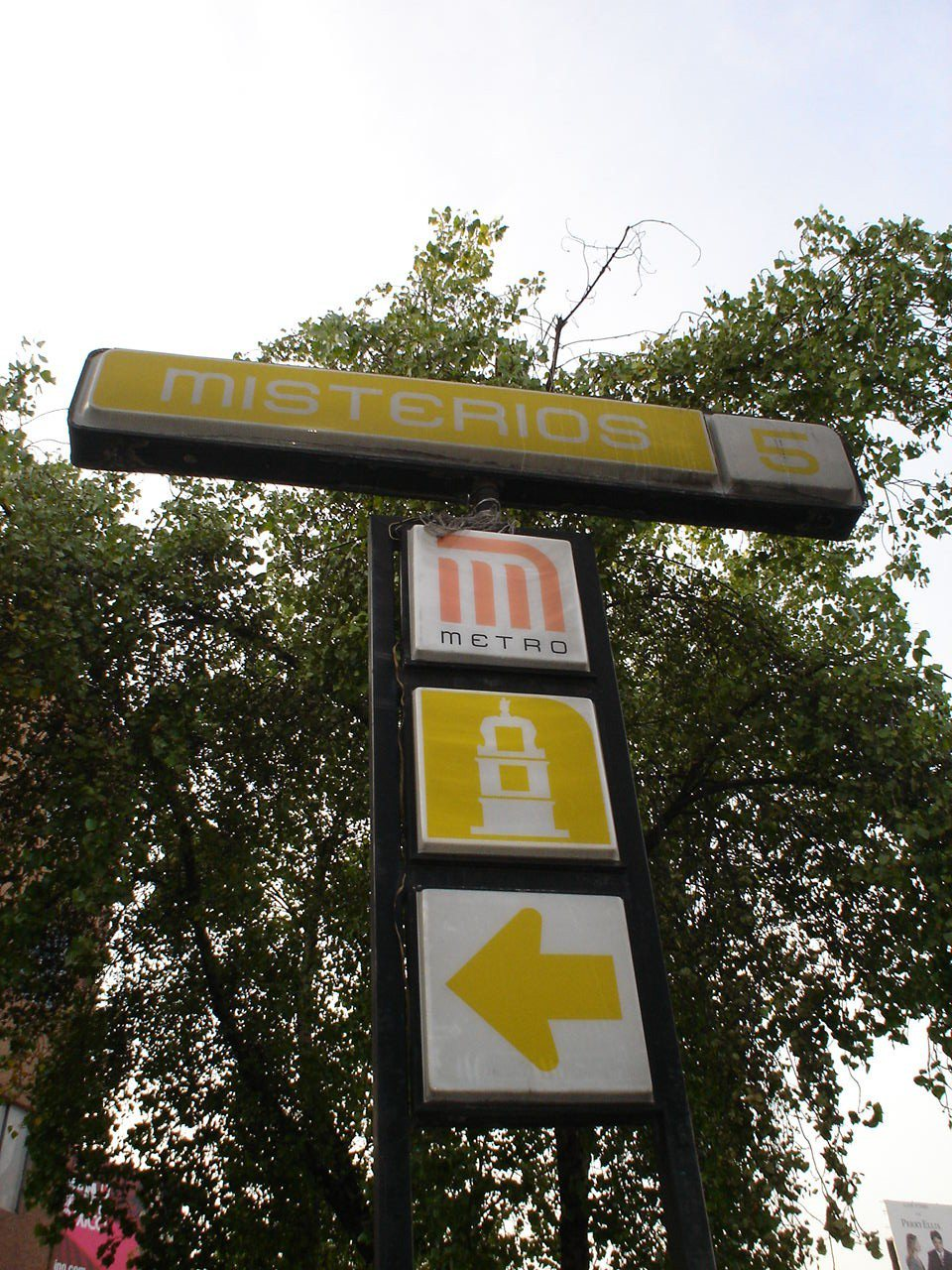
- Station sign, 2006

General information
- Location: Río Consulado Avenue and Constantino Street; Cuauhtémoc and Gustavo A. Madero, Mexico City; Mexico
- Coordinates: 19°27′48″N 99°07′51″W
- System: Mexico City Metro
- Owner: Government of Mexico City
- Operator: Sistema de Transporte Colectivo (STC)
- Platforms: 2 side platforms
- Tracks: 2
- Connections: Misterios; Route: 200; Trolleybus Line 5: Río Consulado; Route: 20-A

Construction
- Structure type: Underground

Other information
- Status: In service

History
- Opened: 1 July 1982; 44 years ago

Key dates
- 23 April 2020; 6 years ago: Temporarily closed
- 15 June 2020; 6 years ago: Reopened

Passengers
- 2025: 2,518,389 (Note: The system's website counts only passenger entries into stations and does not include passengers passing through, transferring between lines, or exiting the station. The data here is limited to the most recent ten years to avoid excessive listings; earlier figures can be found in this page's history or on the Mexico City Metro website. To calculate the average daily ridership, the annual total is divided by 365 days (366 in leap years), with decimals omitted from the result. Each station per line is ranked individually, as the system counts transfer stations separately. The percentage change is calculated automatically using the data from the current year and the previous year.) ▼4.77%
- Rank: 164/195

Services
Preceding station	Mexico City Metro	Following station
La Raza toward Politécnico	Line 5	Valle Gómez toward Pantitlán
Route map
Location
- Location within Mexico City
- Area map

Misterios metro station (Note: Estación del Metro Misterios. Spanish pronunciation: [misˈteɾjos]. The name of the station literally means "Mysteries" in Spanish.) is a station of the Mexico City Metro in the city's boroughs of Gustavo A. Madero and Cuauhtémoc. It is an underground railway stop with two side platforms serving Line 5 (Yellow Line), between La Raza and Valle Gómez. It was opened on 1 July 1982, providing service north toward La Raza and east toward Pantitlán station.

Misterios metro station services the colonias (neighborhoods) of Peralvillo and Vallejo, along Avenida Río Consulado. The station's name references the nearby Calzada de los Misterios, an avenue with multiple hermitages depicting the Catholic Mysteries of the Rosary. Its pictogram depicts the silhouette of one of these constructions.

Outside, there are multiple bus routes, and nearby is the eponymous Metrobús station serving Line 7. In 2025, Misterios metro station had an average daily ridership of 6,576 passenger entries, ranking it the 164th busiest stop in the network.

== Location and layout ==
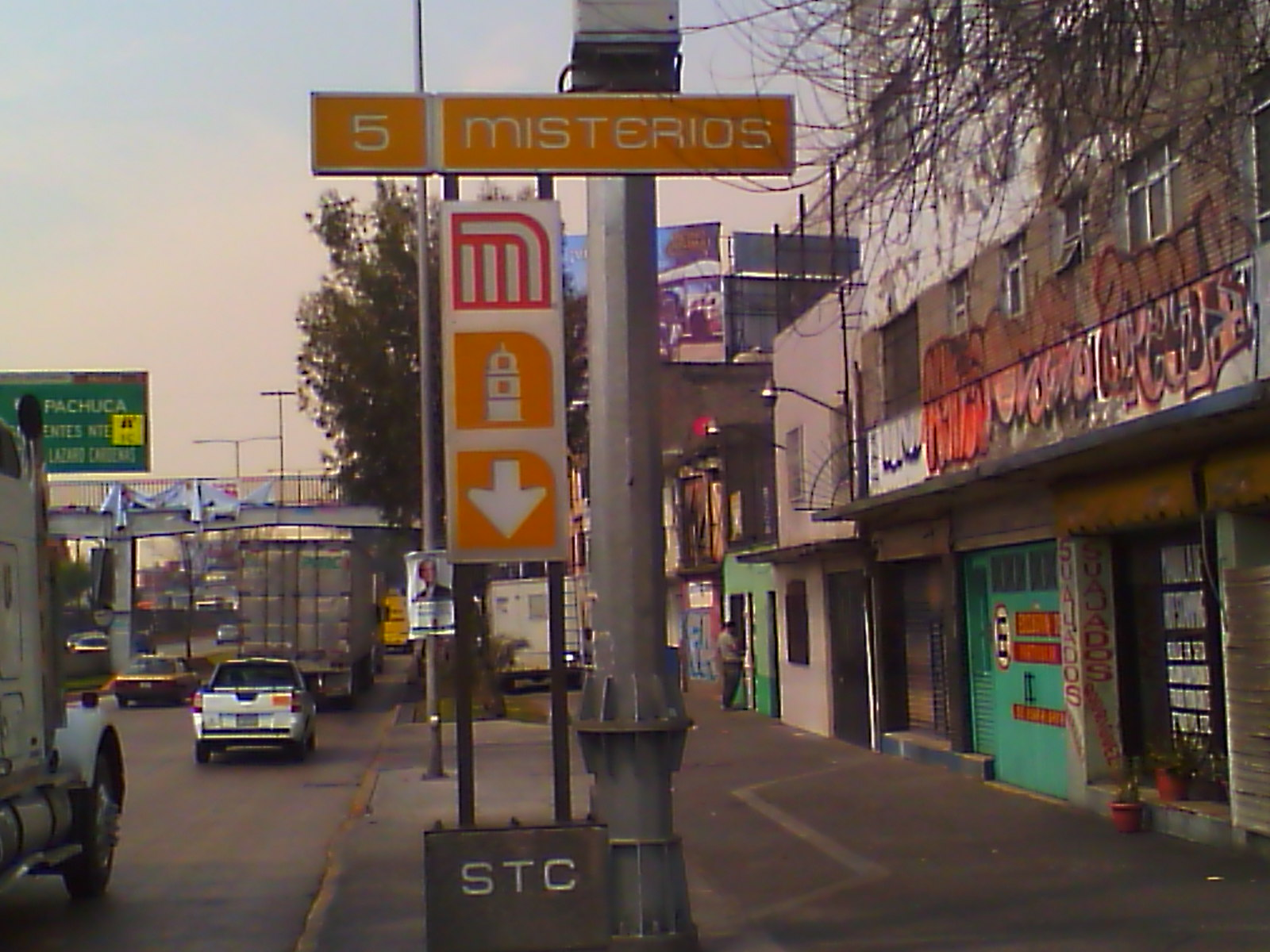
The platforms are below Avenida Río Consulado (pictured)

Misterios is an underground metro station on Line 5 below Circuito Interior, at the Avenida Río Consulado segment. The station is found in the limits of the boroughs of Gustavo A. Madero and Cuauhtémoc, in northern Mexico City. The station serves the Colonias ("neighborhoods") of Vallejo, Gustavo A. Madero, and Peralvillo, Cuauhtémoc. It has two exits leading to Circuito Interior and Calle Constantino: the northern exit serves Colonia Vallejo, while the southern exit serves Colonia Peralvillo.

Within the system, Misterios metro station lies between La Raza and Valle Gómez. The area is serviced by Route 20-A of the city's public bus system, Route 200 of the Red de Transporte de Pasajeros network, Line 7 of the Metrobús system at Misterios bus station, a few blocks away, and Line 4 (formerly Line G) of the trolleybus system.

== History and construction ==
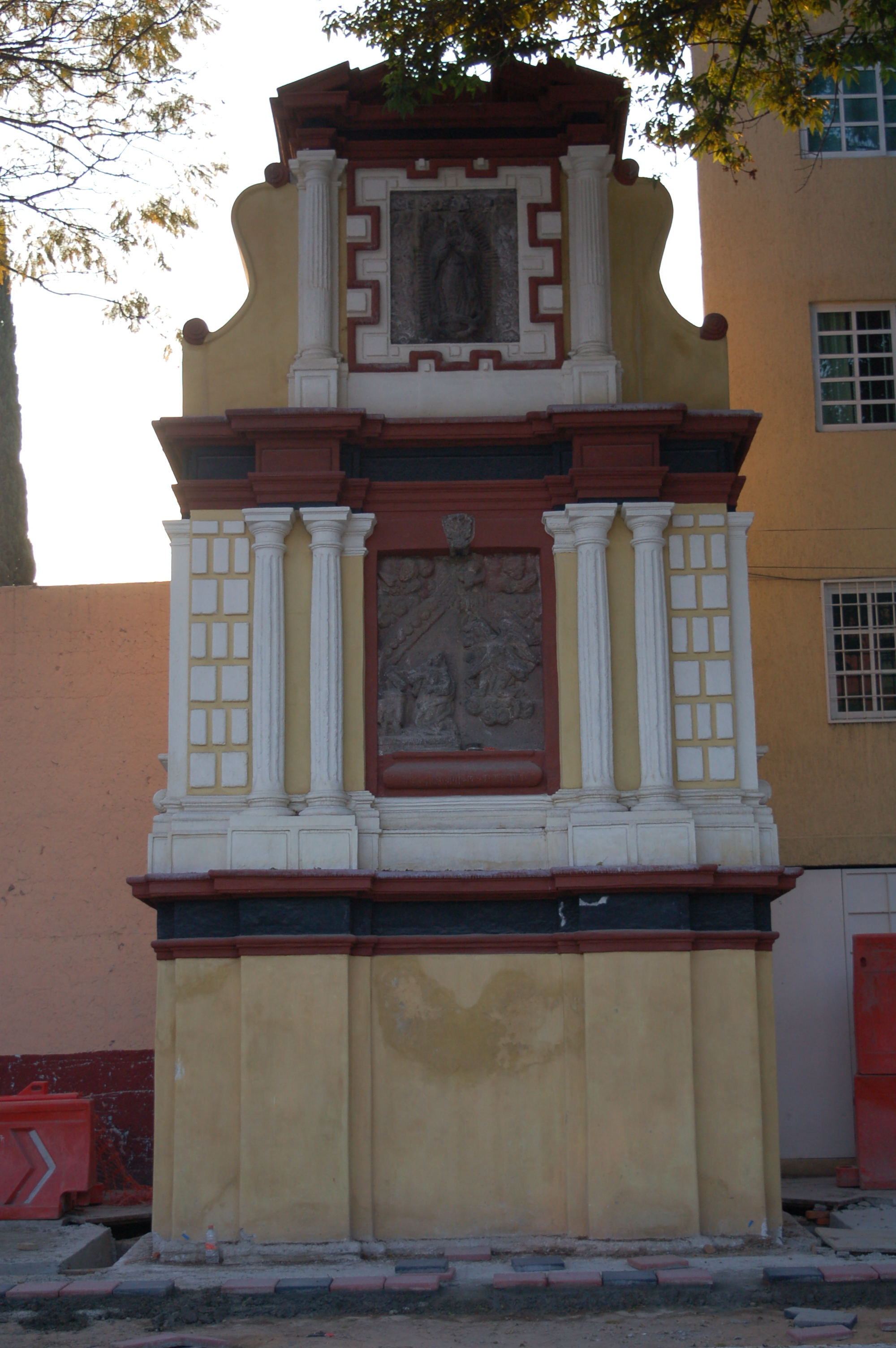
Misterios' pictogram is based on one of the Mysteries of the Rosary located on Calzada de los Misterios (Joyful Mystery: The Annunciation pictured)

Line 5 of the Mexico City Metro was built by Cometro, a subsidiary of Empresas ICA. The section including Misterios metro station formed part of a northward extension from Consulado metro station, and opened on 1 July 1982, while running eastward toward Pantitlán metro station. During construction, workers uncovered part of a road that connected Tenochtitlan with the Tepeyac hill. The road was built with materials dating back to the Mesoamerican Postclassic Period.

Originally, Line 8, which runs from the historic center of Mexico City to Constitución de 1917 station in Iztapalapa, was originally planned to follow a different route, from Pantitlán in eastern Mexico City to Indios Verdes in the north, with a stop at Misterios. However, the project was canceled due to potential structural issues it would have caused near the Zócalo area, as it was intended to interchange with Line 2 at its respective metro station. The plan for Line 8 was later modified to run from Indios Verdes to Constitución de 1917, still stopping at Misterios. But its construction did not progress beyond Garibaldi, which has served as the line's provisional terminal since 1994.

The section between Misterios and La Raza station descends from street level to the underground level and measures 892 meters (2,927 ft), while the opposite section toward Valle Gómez station is 969 meters (3,179 ft) long.

=== Name and pictogram ===
The station is named after the nearby Calzada de los Misterios, an avenue connecting the Basilica of Our Lady of Guadalupe with Paseo de la Reforma. The avenue has fifteen hermitages built in the 17th century, each representing one of the Mysteries of the Rosary. The station's pictogram represents one of these hermitages.

=== Incidents ===
A train's railway coupler broke on 21 April 2020 near the station. From 23 April to 15 June 2020, the station was temporarily closed due to the COVID-19 pandemic in Mexico. On 21 February 2021, a train window was ejected in the tunnel between Misterios and Valle Gómez, causing a short circuit.

== Ridership ==
Daily ridership for Misterios station in 2024

According to official data, before the impact of the COVID-19 pandemic, the station recorded between 8,000 and 8,400 average daily entries from 2016 to 2019. In 2025, it recorded 2,400,344 passenger entries, ranking 164th among the system's 195 stations.

Annual passenger ridership
Year	Ridership	Average daily	Rank	% change	Ref.
2025	2,400,344	6,576	164/195	−4.77%	
2024	2,520,516	6,886	152/195	+0.08%	
2023	2,518,389	6,899	142/195	+7.28%	
2022	2,347,498	6,431	145/195	+38.37%	
2021	1,696,494	4,647	149/195	+15.32%	
2020	1,471,058	4,019	170/195	−50.20%	
2019	2,953,802	8,092	164/195	−3.52%	
2018	3,061,616	8,387	163/195	+2.05%	
2017	3,000,250	8,219	163/195	+0.51%	
2016	2,985,039	8,155	165/195	−0.67%	
