= Valle Gómez metro station =

Mexico City Metro station

Valle Gómez
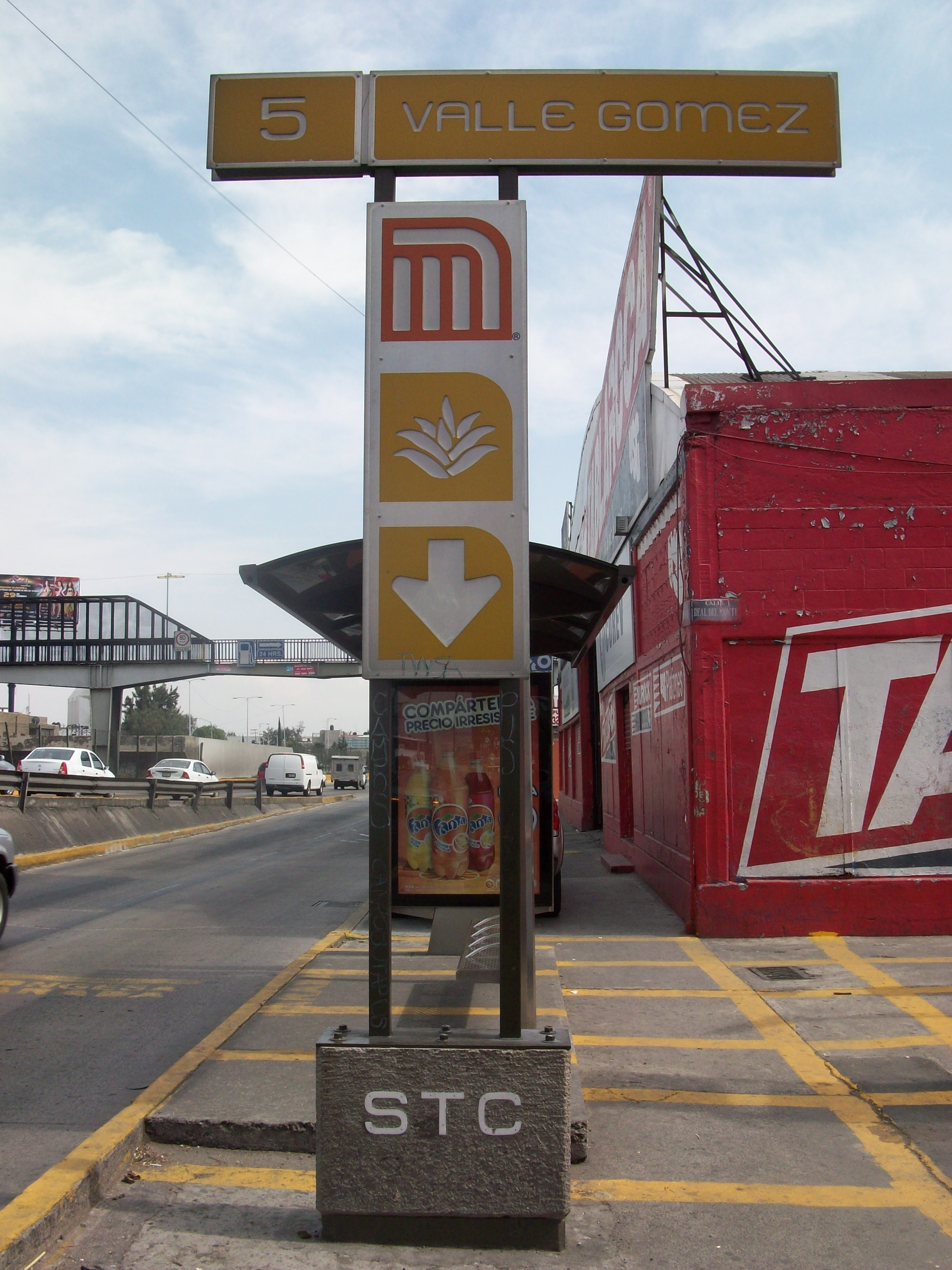
- Station sign, 2012

General information
- Location: Río Consulado Avenue; Gustavo A. Madero and Venustiano Carranza, Mexico City; Mexico
- Coordinates: 19°27′31″N 99°07′09″W
- System: Mexico City Metro
- Owner: Government of Mexico City
- Operator: Sistema de Transporte Colectivo (STC)
- Platforms: 2 side platforms
- Tracks: 2
- Connections: Route: 200; Routes: 5-A, 20-A

Construction
- Structure type: Underground

Other information
- Status: In service

History
- Opened: 1 July 1982; 44 years ago

Key dates
- 23 April 2020; 6 years ago: Temporarily closed
- 15 June 2020; 6 years ago: Reopened

Passengers
- 2025: 1,414,821 (Note: The system's website counts only passenger entries into stations and does not include passengers passing through, transferring between lines, or exiting the station. The data here is limited to the most recent ten years to avoid excessive listings; earlier figures can be found in this page's history or on the Mexico City Metro website. To calculate the average daily ridership, the annual total is divided by 365 days (366 in leap years), with decimals omitted from the result. Each station per line is ranked individually, as the system counts transfer stations separately. The percentage change is calculated automatically using the data from the current year and the previous year.) ▼0.05%
- Rank: 186/195

Services
Preceding station	Mexico City Metro	Following station
Misterios toward Politécnico	Line 5	Consulado toward Pantitlán
Route map
Location
- Location within Mexico City
- Area map

Valle Gómez metro station (Note: Estación del Metro Valle Gómez. Mexican Spanish pronunciation: [ˈbaʎe ˈɣomes].) is a station of the Mexico City Metro in the city's boroughs of Gustavo A. Madero and Venustiano Carranza. It is an underground railway stop with two side platforms serving Line 5 (Yellow Line), between Misterios and Consulado. It was opened on 1 July 1982, providing service north toward La Raza and east toward Pantitlán station.

Valle Gómez metro station services the colonias (neighborhoods) of 7 de Noviembre and Valle Gómez, along Avenida Río Consulado. The station's name references the neighborhood, where a paddock formerly existed and agave plants grew, becoming the station's representative pictogram.

Inside Valle Gómez metro station, there is an Internet cafe. Outside, there are a few bus services in the area. In 2025, the metro station had an average daily ridership of 3,876 passenger entries, ranking it the 186th busiest stop in the network, making it one of the least-accessed stations in the system.

== Location and layout ==
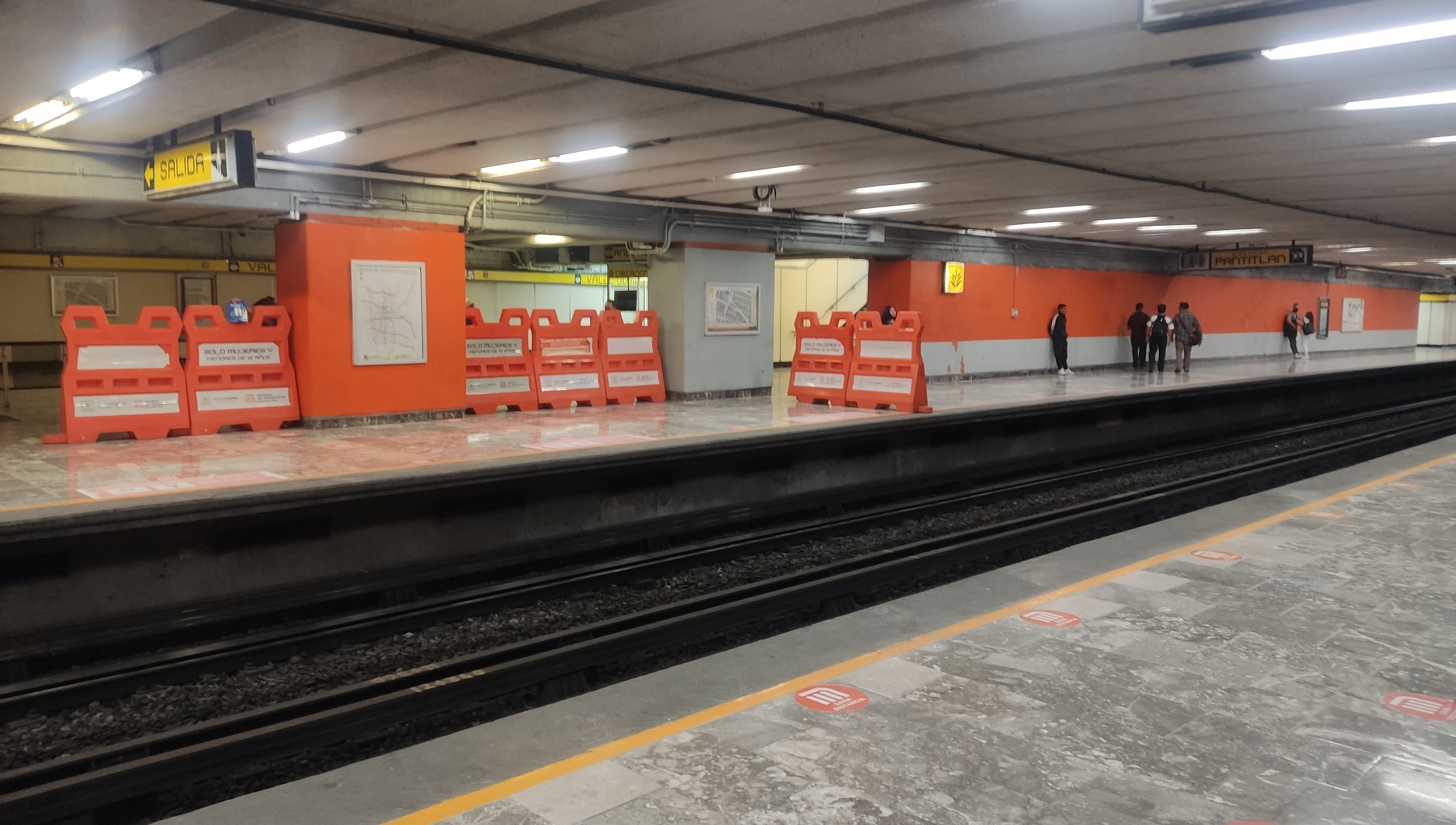
The station platforms in 2022

Valle Gómez is an underground metro station on Line 5 below Circuito Interior, at the Avenida Río Consulado segment. The station is found in the limits of the boroughs of Gustavo A. Madero and Venustiano Carranza, in northeastern Mexico City. The station serves the Colonias ("neighborhoods") of 7 de Noviembre, Gustavo A. Madero, and Valle Gómez, Venustiano Carranza. It has two exits leading to Circuito Interior: the northern exit serves Colonia 7 de Noviembre at the corner of Calle Norte 50, while the southern exit serves Colonia Valle Gómez, leading to Avenida Real del Monte.

Within the system, Valle Gómez metro station lies between Misterios and Consulado. The area is serviced by Routes 5-A and 20-A of the city's public bus system, as well as Route 200 of the Red de Transporte de Pasajeros network.

There is an Internet café inside the station's facilities.

== History and construction ==
Line 5 of the Mexico City Metro was built by Cometro, a subsidiary of Empresas ICA. The section including Valle Gómez metro station formed part of a northward extension from Consulado metro station, and opened on 1 July 1982, while running eastward toward Pantitlán metro station. During construction, workers uncovered part of a road that connected Tenochtitlan with the Tepeyac hill. The road was built with materials dating back to the Mesoamerican Postclassic Period.

The section between Valle Gómez and Misterios mesures 969 meters (3,179 ft), while the opposite section toward Consulado station emerges to the grade level and is 679 meters (2,228 ft) long.

=== Name and pictogram ===
The pictogram representing Valle Gómez metro station is the silhouette of an agave plant. The area where the neighborhood lies was formerly a paddock named La Vaquita, where agave plants grew. It was owned by the Valle Gómez family.

=== Incidents ===
According to the system authorities, the section between Valle Gómez and Consulado stations is a common site of copper wire theft, which could potentially cause fires on the tracks. From 23 April to 15 June 2020, the station was temporarily closed due to the COVID-19 pandemic in Mexico. On 21 February 2021, a train window was ejected in the tunnel between Misterios and Valle Gómez, causing a short circuit.

== Ridership ==
Daily ridership for Valle Gómez station in 2024

According to official data, before the impact of the COVID-19 pandemic, the station recorded between 4,400 and 4,600 average daily entries from 2016 to 2019. In 2025, it recorded 1,414,821 passenger entries, ranking 186th among the system's 195 stations.

Annual passenger ridership
Year	Ridership	Average daily	Rank	% change	Ref.
2025	1,414,821	3,876	186/195	−0.05%	
2024	1,415,483	3,867	178/195	−2.47%	
2023	1,451,279	3,976	171/195	+11.57%	
2022	1,300,746	3,563	169/195	+42.48%	
2021	912,959	2,501	180/195	+5.65%	
2020	864,127	2,361	190/195	−46.39%	
2019	1,611,907	4,416	189/195	−3.03%	
2018	1,662,292	4,554	189/195	+2.58%	
2017	1,620,478	4,439	189/195	−2.26%	
2016	1,657,884	4,529	188/195	+1.33%	
