= La Raza metro station =

Mexico City Metro station

La Raza
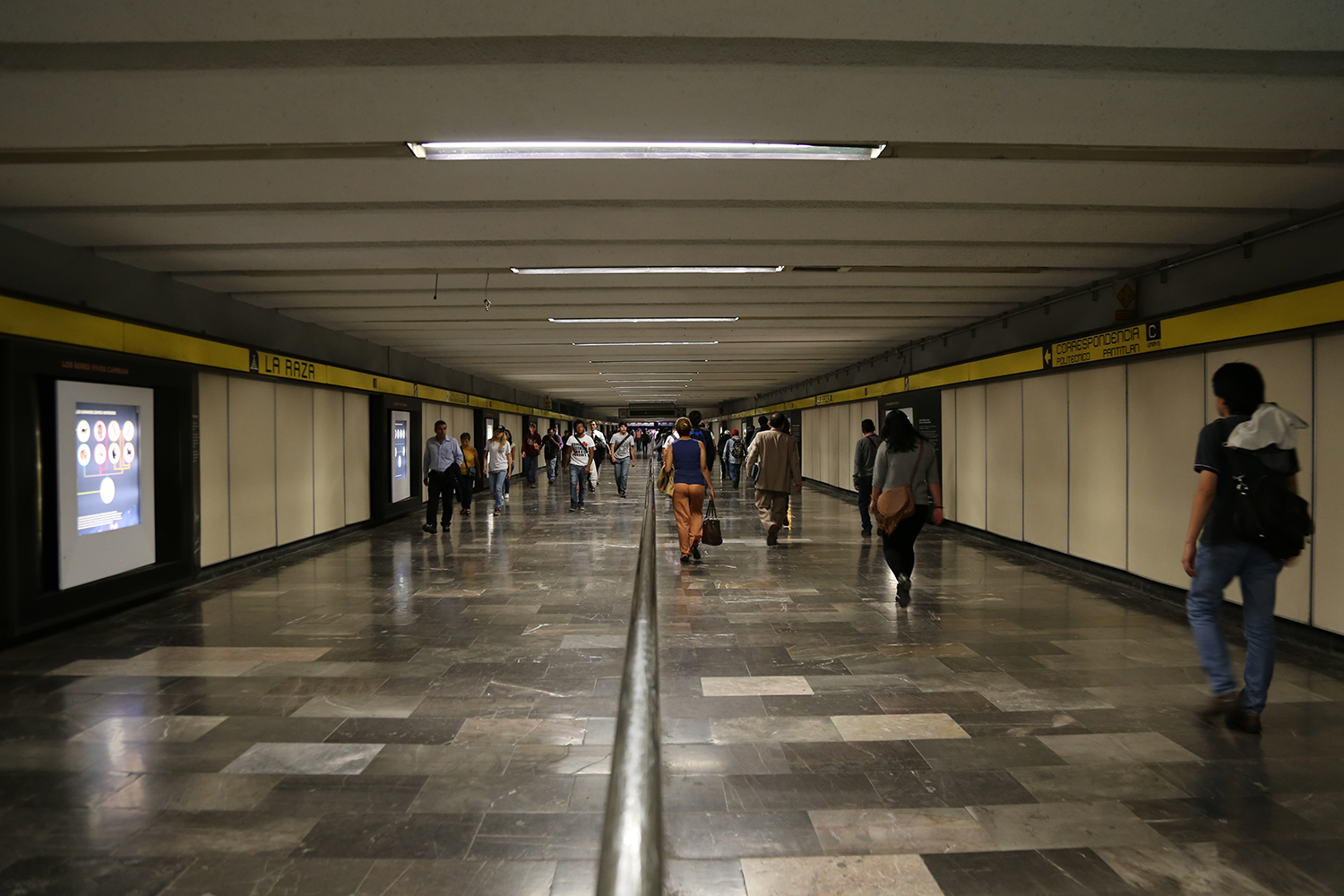
- Various scientific images are displayed inside La Raza's transfer tunnel (pictured)

General information
- Location: Insurgentes Norte Avenue; Leoncavallo Street and Paganini Street; Gustavo A. Madero, Mexico City; Mexico
- Coordinates: 19°28′13″N 99°08′13″W
- System: Mexico City Metro
- Owner: Government of Mexico City
- Operator: Sistema de Transporte Colectivo (STC)
- Platforms: 4 side platforms (2 per line)
- Tracks: 4 (2 per line)
- Connections: La Raza; La Raza; La Raza; La Raza; Routes: 11-A, 12, 23, 27-A, 103; La Raza; Routes: 7-D, 20-C, 20-D

Construction
- Structure type: Underground; At grade
- Cycle facilities: Bicycle parking-only
- Accessible: Partial

Other information
- Status: In service

History
- Opened: 25 August 1978; 48 years ago; 1 July 1982; 44 years ago

Passengers
- 2025: 13,029,191 (Note: The Mexico City Metro system counts the entries from interchange stations separately. Individually, Line 3 saw 9,968,302 passengers, while Line 5 recorded 3,060,889 passengers.) (Note: The system's website counts only passenger entries into stations and does not include passengers passing through, transferring between lines, or exiting the station. The data here is limited to the most recent ten years to avoid excessive listings; earlier figures can be found in this page's history or on the Mexico City Metro website. To calculate the average daily ridership, the annual total is divided by 365 days (366 in leap years), with decimals omitted from the result. Each station per line is ranked individually, as the system counts transfer stations separately. The percentage change is calculated automatically using the data from the current year and the previous year.) ▲1.94%
- Rank: 30/195; 148/195

Services
Preceding station	Mexico City Metro	Following station
Potrero toward Indios Verdes	Line 3	Tlatelolco toward Universidad
Autobuses del Norte toward Politécnico	Line 5	Misterios toward Pantitlán
Route map
Location
- Location within Mexico City
- Area map and exits

La Raza metro station (Note: Estación del Metro La Raza. Mexican Spanish pronunciation: [la 'ra.sa]. The name of the station literally means "The Race"; however, its phrasal sense means "the People".) is a transfer station on the Mexico City Metro in Gustavo A. Madero, Mexico City. La Raza is a combined underground and at-grade station divided into two lines. It serves Lines 3 (Olive Line) and 5 (Yellow Line), each with two side platforms. La Raza metro station is located between Potrero and Tlatelolco stations on Line 3, and between Autobuses del Norte and Misterios stations on Line 5. It serves the Colonias (neighborhoods) of Vallejo and Héroes de Nacozari. The station is situated along Avenida de los Insurgentes and Eje Central.

La Raza metro station opened on 25 August 1978 as the temporary northern terminal of Line 3, with southbound service to Hospital General. Service on Line 5 began on 1 July 1982. The station's pictogram represents the nearby Monumento a la Raza, a pyramid-shaped structure dedicated to la Raza, Mexico's diverse native peoples and cultures.

The station is partially accessible to people with disabilities, including braille signage plates and elevators. The transfer tunnel is approximately 600 meters (2,000 ft) long, making it the second-longest in the system. Inside, The Tunnel of Science permanent science exhibition features science and astronomy pictures and information. Also, there is an Internet café, a showcase exhibition, a library, and a mural titled Monstruos de fin de milenio, painted by Ariosto Otero Reyes. Outside, there is a bicycle parking station and a transportation hub serving local and intercity routes.

In 2025, La Raza metro station served 13,029,191 passenger entries. Since its opening, the station has been the site of several incidents, including a shooting and a train crash in the northbound tunnel, both on Line 3.

== Location and layout ==
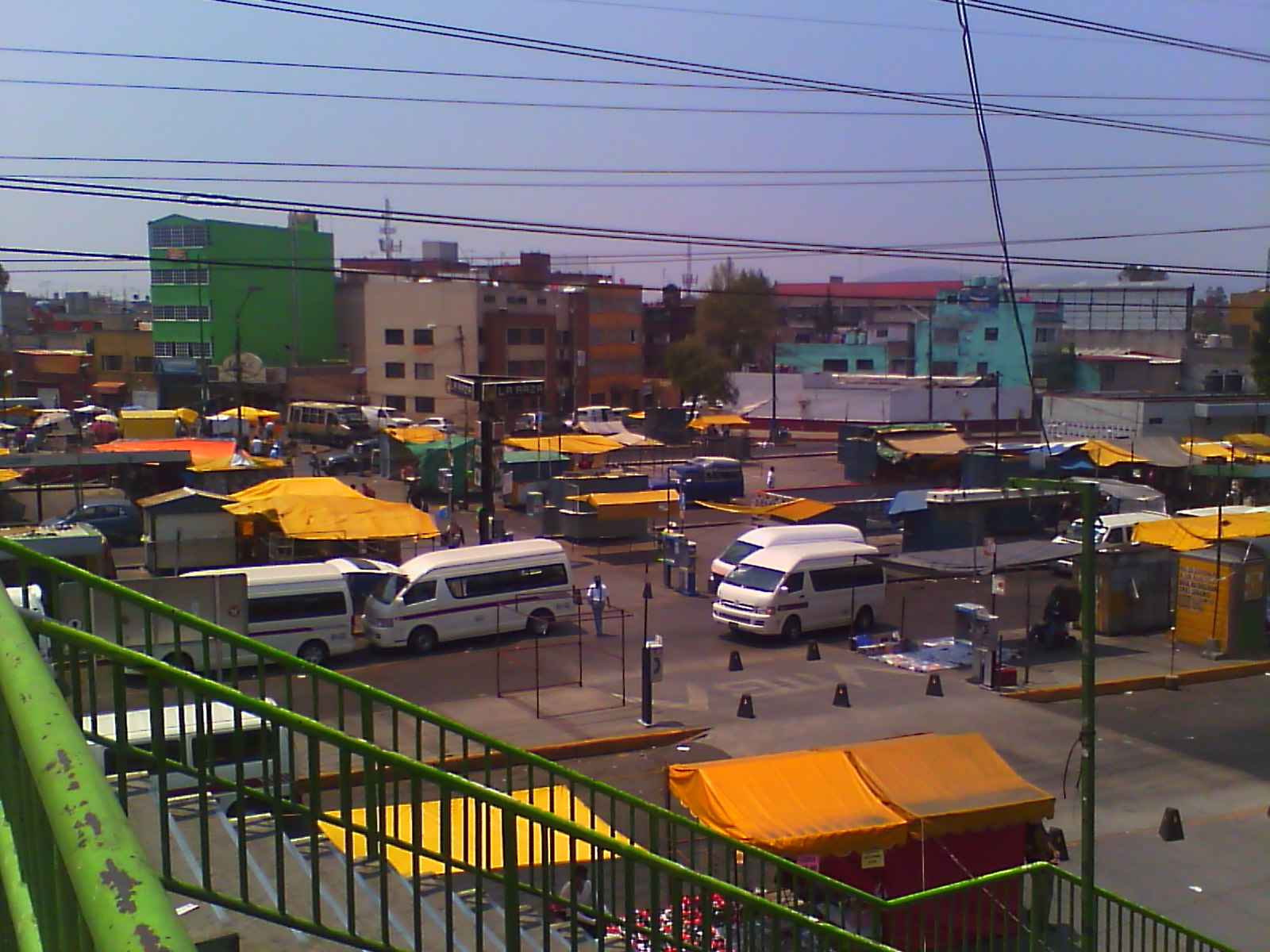
View of the La Raza transportation hub from the outside of Line 3 in 2012

La Raza is a transfer metro station, located in the colonias (neighborhoods) of Héroes de Nacozari and Vallejo, in Gustavo A. Madero borough, northern Mexico City. The stop is situated below Avenida de los Insurgentes (Line 3), and along Eje Central (Line 5). The station facilities offer accessibility for people with disabilities, featuring braille plates and elevators.

Within the system, it is followed by Potrero and Tlatelolco stations on Line 3 and Autobuses del Norte and Misterios stations on Line 5. The station has five exits. On Line 3, the northwest and southwest exits provide access to Avenida de los Insurgentes in Colonia Vallejo, while the western exit leads to the avenue in Colonia Héroes de Nacozari. On Line 5, the northern exit provides access to Calle Leoncavallo and Calle Paganini in Colonia Vallejo, while the southern exit leads to Calle Paganini.

The area is serviced by a Centro de transferencia modal (CETRAM), a type of transportation hub covering 19,544 square meters (210,370 sq ft). From there, commuters can access various routes and modes of transportation. The CETRAM provides access to various routes and modes of transportation, including 1 and 3 of the Mexico City Metrobús system, Line 4 of the Mexibús system, Line 1 (formerly Line A) of the trolleybus network, Routes 11-A, 12, 23, 27-A, and 103 of the Red de Transporte de Pasajeros network, and Routes 7-D, 20-C, and 20-D of the city's public bus network. Street stalls are also present within the CETRAM.

In August 2016, the Government of Mexico City installed a bicycle parking station outside Line 3.

The passenger transfer tunnel that connects Line 3 with Line 5 has an approximate length of 600 m (2,000 ft), and is the second-longest in the system after Atlalilco metro station, which connects Lines 8 and 12 (the Green and Golden lines, respectively), whose length is 880 m (2,890 ft). Inside the station, there is an Internet café, a help desk, and a library.

== History and construction ==
=== Name and pictogram ===
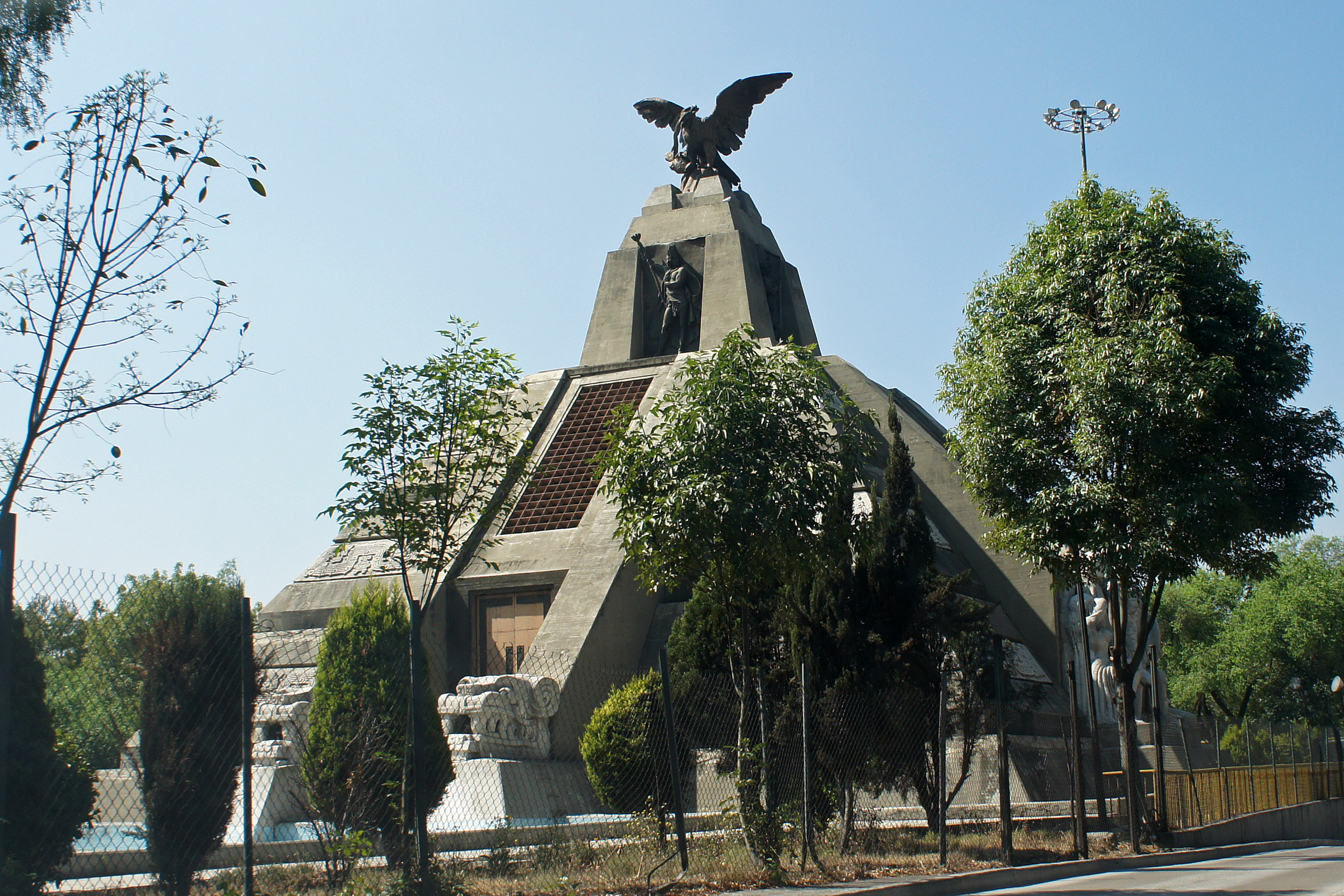
La Raza's pictogram is inspired by the Monumento a la Raza pyramid (pictured)

La Raza metro station pictogram was named after the nearby Monumento a la Raza, a pyramid-shaped construction erected in 1940 in honor of la Raza; the station's pictogram features the silhouette of the monument.

=== Line 3 ===
The line was built by Ingeniería de Sistemas de Transportes Metropolitano, Electrometro, and Cometro, the latter being a subsidiary of Empresas ICA. La Raza metro station opened on 25 August 1978, providing service southward toward Hospital General station. It became the northern terminal of the line until service was extended northward to Indios Verdes on 1 December 1979.

The station was built underground, and the stretch between La Raza and Potrero transitions from the underground level to the grade level. Its length is 1,106 meters (3,629 ft). The opposite tunnel toward Tlatelolco is 1,445 m (4,741 ft) long.

=== Line 5 ===
Cometro built the line, which was inaugurated on 19 December 1981. The station opened on 1 July 1982, as part of the western expansion from Consulado to La Raza. The station was built at grade level and served as the terminus station, until the northwest extension toward Politécnico opened on 30 August 1982. The section between La Raza and Autobuses del Norte is 975 m (3,199 ft) long, while the opposite one toward Misterios is 892 m (2,927 ft) long, going from the street level to the underground one.

In 2008, Metro authorities performed maintenance work on the station's roof.

=== Incidents ===
The station floods during periods of heavy rainfall.

On 28 September 1995, Ernesto Cruz Jiménez, a police officer from Huixquilucan, State of Mexico, entered a parked train and shot seven passengers, killing two. After his arrest, Cruz said that he felt depressed. He was sentenced to 50 years in prison. Following the shooting, the Government of Mexico City installed walk-through metal detectors in multiple stations.

On 15 May 2026, a shock group from the UNAM's College of Sciences and Humanities beat up a man in the transfer tunnel and set off firecrackers.

==== 2023 train crash ====
Entrance to the tunnel toward La Raza station the day of the accident.

Two trains collided inside the La Raza–Potrero interstation tunnel while both headed toward Indios Verdes metro station on 7 January 2023. The accident killed one person and injuring 106 others. Twenty days later, the Mexico City Attorney General's Office attributed the accident to two factors: reported cable theft in the area the previous day and negligent driving by the operator, who had failed to deactivate the autopilot and switch to manual operation in the affected area, as required by the procedure manual. Following the accident, the Mexico City government deployed National Guard personnel to monitor Metro stations, alleging that opponents had sabotaged the system without providing evidence to support the claim. A Metro driver subsequently published a video showing the condition of the tunnels, including areas with inadequate lighting.

== Landmarks ==
=== El túnel de la ciencia ===
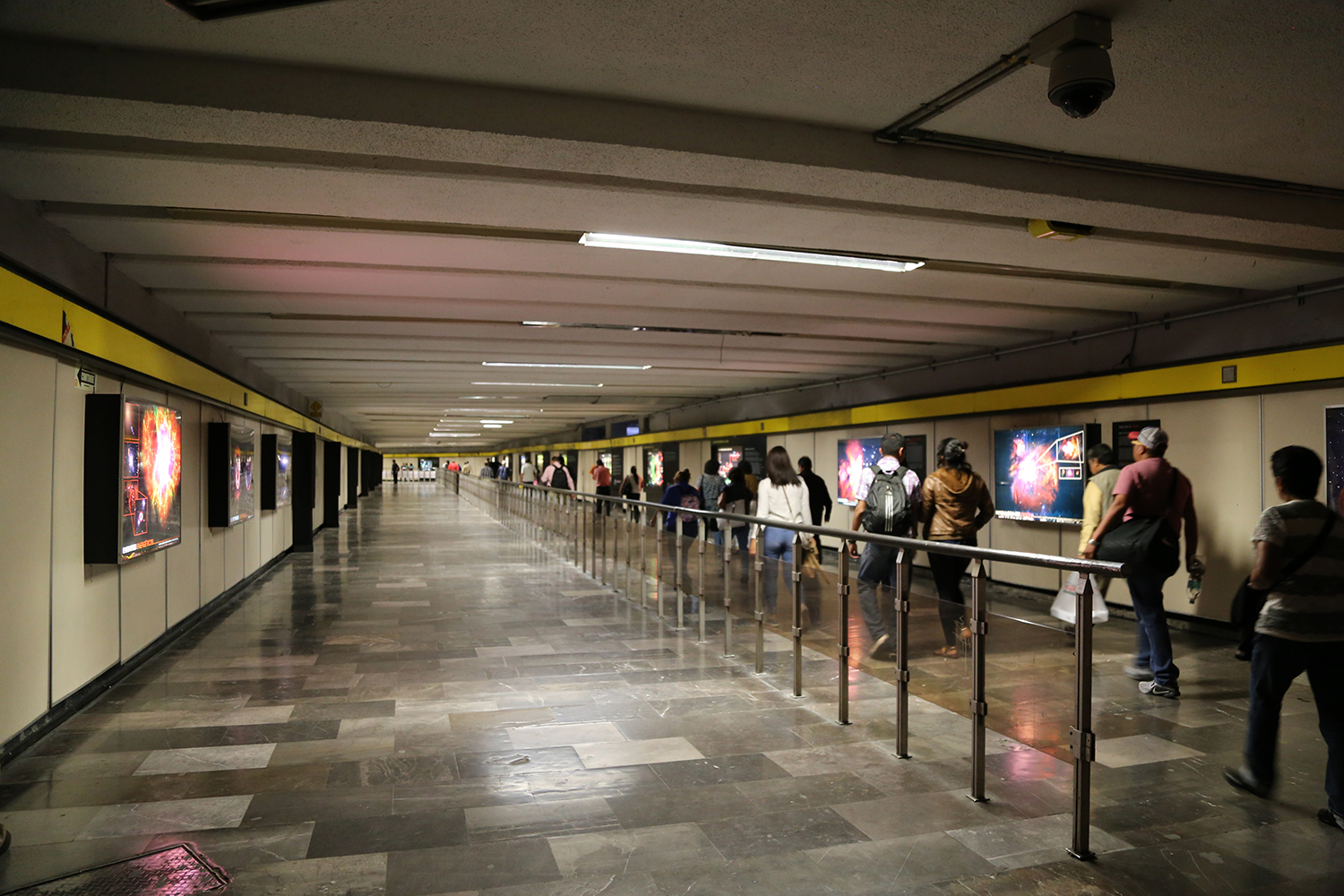
The transfer tunnel at La Raza station is approximately 600 m (2,000 ft) long.

The El túnel de la ciencia Museum (lit. transl. The Tunnel of Science) is a permanent exhibition that displays images and information about science and astronomy on the walls inside the transfer tunnel. It was inaugurated on 30 November 1988, becoming the first Latin American scientific exhibition installed in a public transport facility. It was installed to provide scientific information to passengers, particularly aimed at young people, many of whom are students at the National Autonomous University of Mexico (UNAM) and the National Polytechnic Institute (IPN).

The tunnel covers an area of 6,177 square meters (66,490 sq ft) and features images of autumn-sky constellations, planets and satellites, and the Milky Way. In the middle of the tunnel, there is a drawn-to-scale representation of the celestial sphere displaying the 12 zodiac constellations in luminous paint. The exhibition was installed by Universum, UNAM's science museum. It is estimated that 60,000 people visit the exhibition through guided tours. In 2018, the Institute of Astronomy of the UNAM remodeled the exposition.

=== Other exhibitions ===
On 25 November 2008, the Metro authorities installed the mural Monstruos de fin de milenio (1997; lit. transl. Monsters from the End of the Millennium), painted and donated by the Mexican painter Ariosto Otero Reyes.

In June 2015, the Center for Research and Advanced Studies (CINVESTAV) of the IPN exhibited multiple human brains, showcasing their anatomy, and some injuries they had suffered. In April 2016, the Geology Museum of the UNAM displayed rocks, fossils, minerals, and a shark jaw. In June 2016, the system featured an exhibition of 80 preserved human body parts by the Tominaga Nakamoto University, a display of 50 sculptures by Nour Kuri depicting human bodies, and six photographs by Duilio Rodríguez representing pain.

In May and June 2018, La Raza metro station hosted exhibitions by Manuel de la Cera, Norma Patiño, Teresa Olalde, and the Metropolitan Autonomous University (UAM)'s LibroFest. From 21 August to 15 October 2018, the Secretariat of Agriculture and Rural Development (SAGARPA) and the National Commission for the Knowledge and Use of Biodiversity (CONABIO) presented an exhibition in the tunnel focused on bees and their ecological importance. In 2020, the station temporarily displayed pictures, landscapes, and sculptures created by the Swiss artist H. R. Giger.

=== Gallery ===
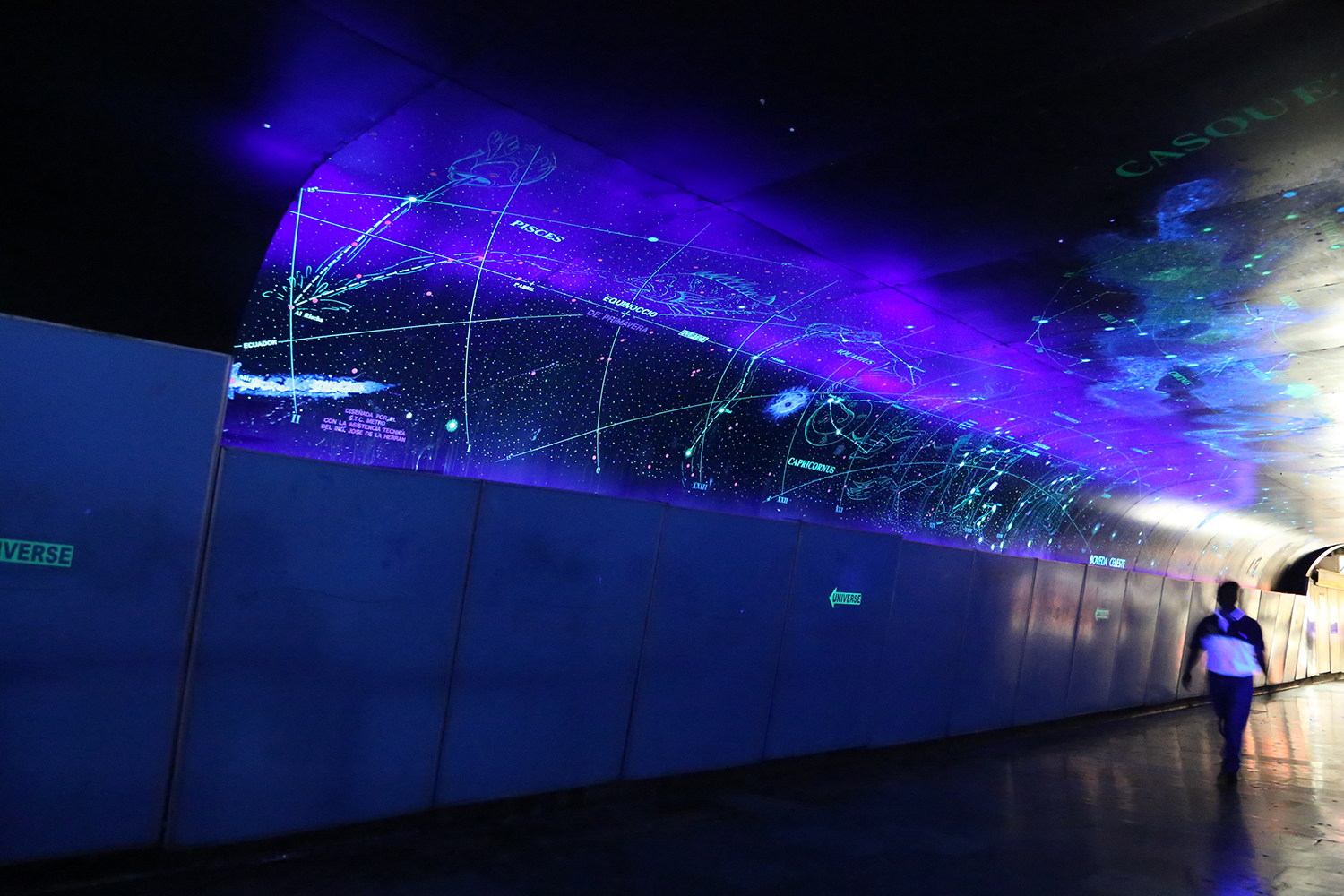
In the middle of the tunnel, a representation of the celestial sphere is depicted with luminous paint

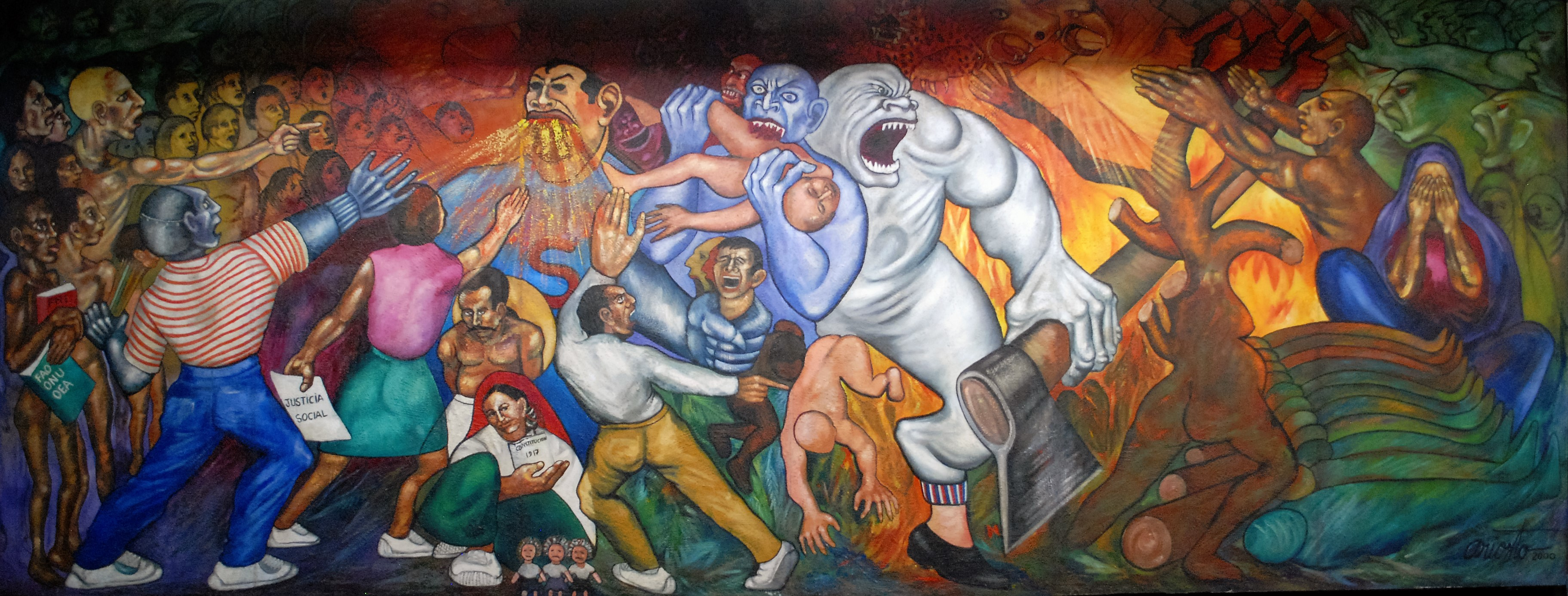
Monstruos de Fin de Milenio mural by Ariosto Otero Reyes

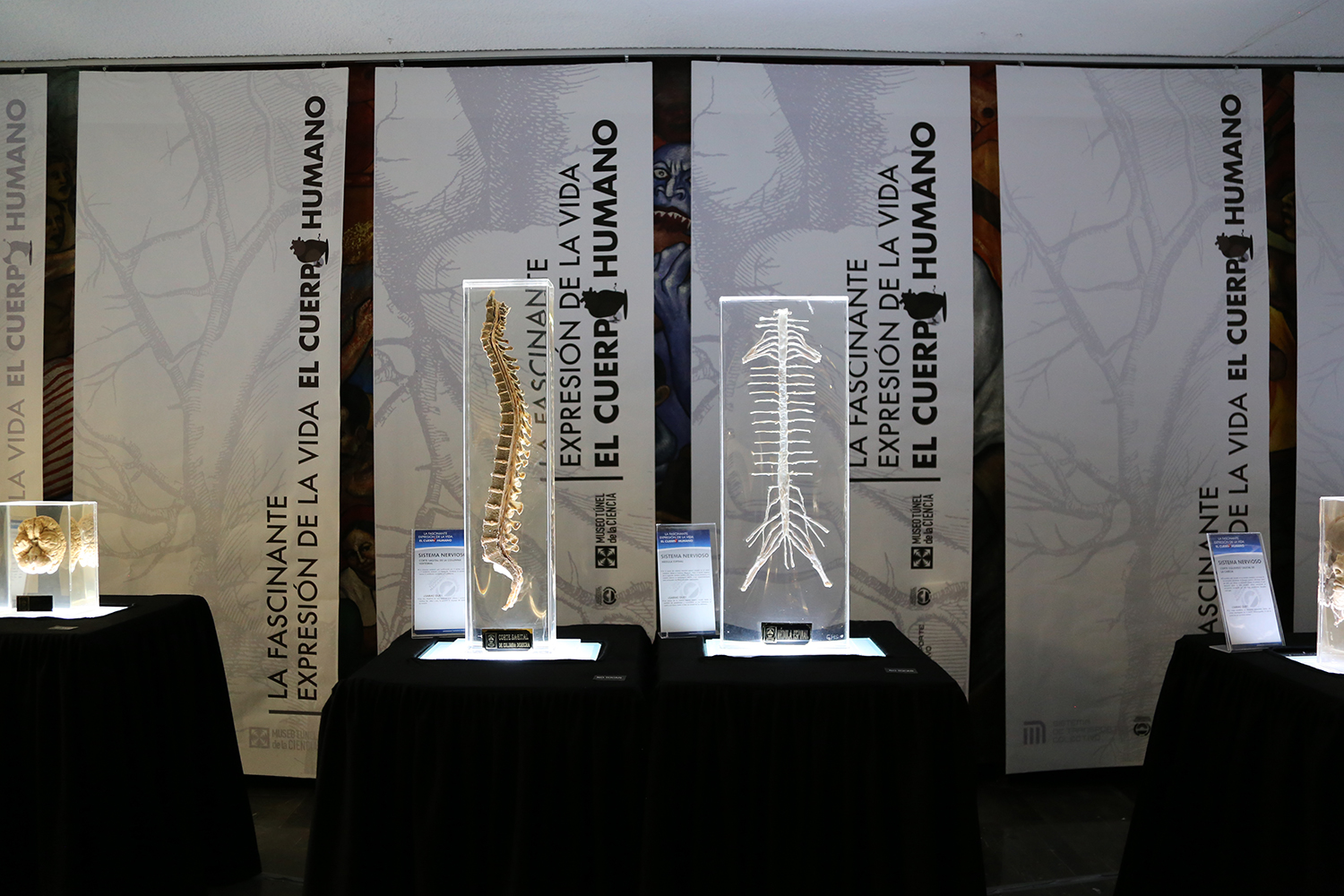
The June 2016 exhibition on the human body displaying the nervous system

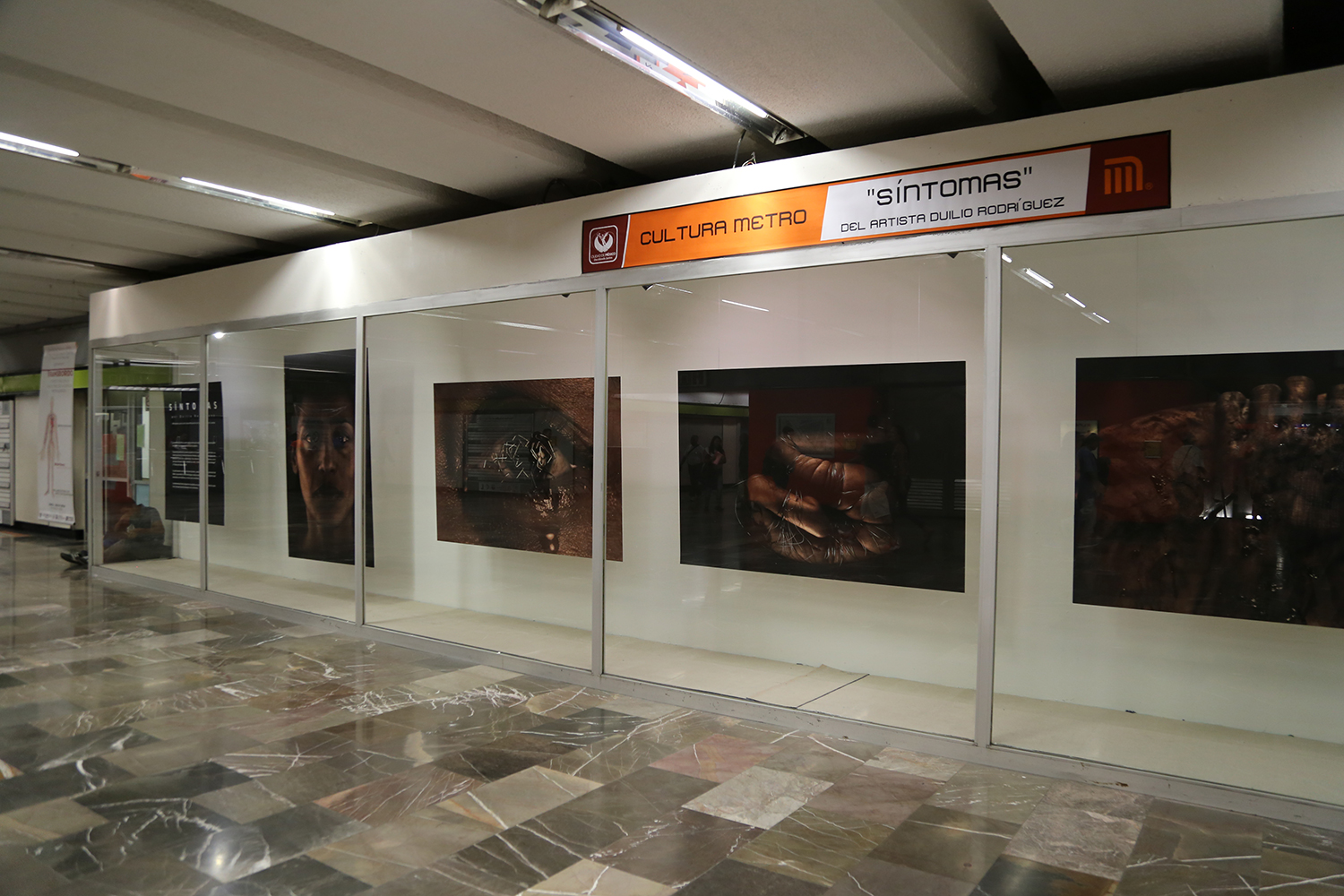
Síntomas by Duilio Rodríguez

Landmarks and exhibitions at La Raza

== Ridership ==
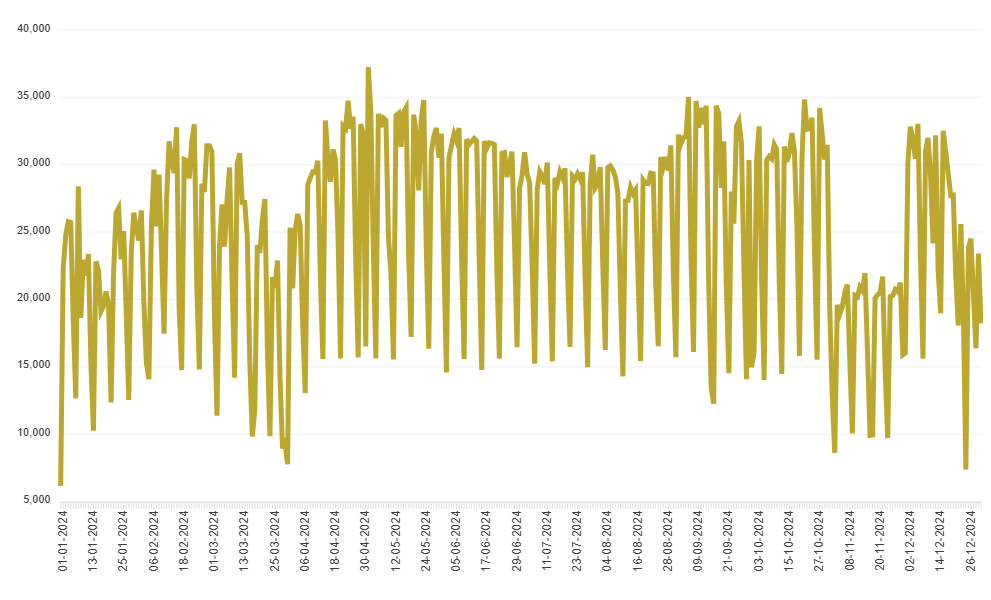
Daily ridership for Line 3 in 2024

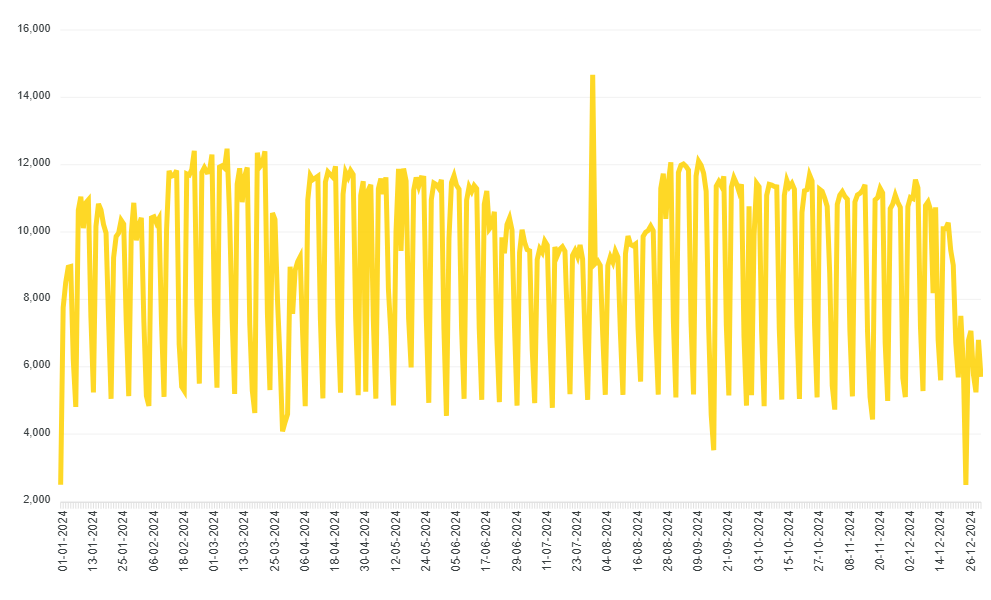
Daily ridership for Line 5 in 2024

According to official data, Line 3 records higher entries than Line 5. Prior to the impact of the COVID-19 pandemic, La Raza metro station recorded a total ridership of 14,942,281 passengers in 2019, averaging 40,937 daily entries.

The station's total ridership for 2025 was 13,029,191 passengers, with a daily average of 35,696 entries. By line, Line 3 recorded 9,968,302 passengers, averaging 27,310 per day. Line 5 recorded 3,060,889 passengers, averaging 8,385. In the same year, when considered individually among the system's 195 stations, the Line 3 station ranked 30th busiest, while the Line 5 station ranked 148th.

Annual passenger ridership (Line 3)
Year	Ridership	Average daily	Rank	% change	Ref.
2025	9,968,302	27,310	30/195	+5.73%	
2024	9,428,172	25,760	31/195	+3.86%	
2023	9,077,998	24,871	29/195	+2.30%	
2022	8,873,704	24,311	26/195	+41.34%	
2021	6,278,397	17,201	33/195	−7.90%	
2020	6,817,252	18,626	33/195	−40.01%	
2019	11,364,171	31,134	38/195	−3.38%	
2018	11,761,940	32,224	35/195	−0.50%	
2017	11,820,693	32,385	36/195	+5.19%	
2016	11,237,304	30,703	43/195	−5.01%	

Annual passenger ridership (Line 5)
Year	Ridership	Average daily	Rank	% change	Ref.
2025	3,060,889	8,385	148/195	−8.70%	
2024	3,352,554	9,159	135/195	−1.93%	
2023	3,418,439	9,365	124/195	+15.00%	
2022	2,972,607	8,144	133/195	+23.14%	
2021	2,414,062	6,613	125/195	+8.25%	
2020	2,230,054	6,093	146/195	−37.68%	
2019	3,578,110	9,803	155/195	−1.28%	
2018	3,624,651	9,930	154/195	−0.37%	
2017	3,638,243	9,967	152/195	+4.42%	
2016	3,484,215	9,519	151/195	−8.53%	
