= Autobuses del Norte metro station =

Mexico City Metro station

Autobuses del Norte
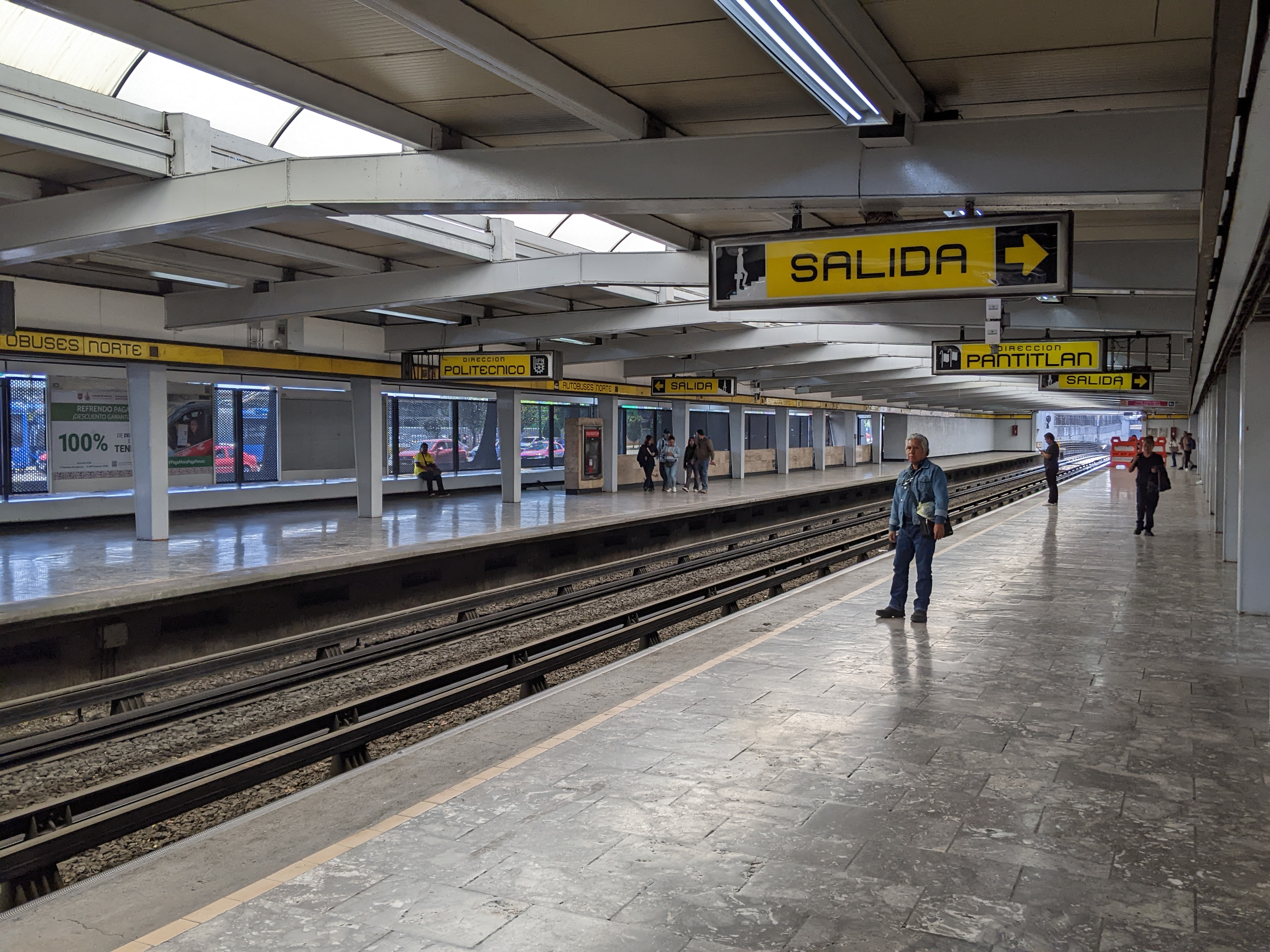
- The station's platforms in 2025

General information
- Location: Eje Central; Gustavo A. Madero, Mexico City; Mexico
- Coordinates: 19°28′44″N 99°08′26″W
- System: Mexico City Metro
- Owner: Government of Mexico City
- Operator: Sistema de Transporte Colectivo (STC)
- Platforms: 2 side platforms
- Tracks: 2
- Connections: Northern Bus Terminal; Routes: 23, 103; Autobuses del Norte; Route: 15-A

Construction
- Structure type: At grade
- Accessible: Partial

Other information
- Status: In service

History
- Opened: 30 August 1982; 44 years ago

Passengers
- 2025: 6,556,986 (Note: The system's website counts only passenger entries into stations and does not include passengers passing through, transferring between lines, or exiting the station. The data here is limited to the most recent ten years to avoid excessive listings; earlier figures can be found in this page's history or on the Mexico City Metro website. To calculate the average daily ridership, the annual total is divided by 365 days (366 in leap years), with decimals omitted from the result. Each station per line is ranked individually, as the system counts transfer stations separately. The percentage change is calculated automatically using the data from the current year and the previous year.) ▼5.17%
- Rank: 68/195

Services
| Preceding station | Mexico City Metro | Following station |
|---|---|---|
| Instituto del Petróleo toward Politécnico | Line 5 | La Raza toward Pantitlán |
Route map
Location
- Location within Mexico City
- Area map and exits

Autobuses del Norte metro station (Note: Estación del Metro Autobuses del Norte. Spanish pronunciation: [awtoˈβuses ðel ˈnoɾte]. The name of the station means "Northern Buses" in Spanish, and it is also known as "North Bus Station" in English.) is a station of the Mexico City Metro in the city's borough of Gustavo A. Madero. It is an at-grade railway stop with two side platforms serving Line 5 (Yellow Line), between Instituto del Petróleo and La Raza. It was opened on 30 August 1982, providing service north toward Politécnico and east toward Pantitlán.

Autobuses del Norte metro station services the colonias (neighborhoods) of Capultitlan and Ampliación Panamericana, along Eje Central Avenue. The station's name references the adjacent to Mexico City's Northern Bus Terminal, and its pictogram depicts an intercity bus referencing the terminal. The station offers a limited accessible service with elevators.

In 2025, Autobuses del Norte metro station had an average daily ridership of 17,964 passenger entries, ranking it the 68th busiest stop in the network.

== Location and layout ==
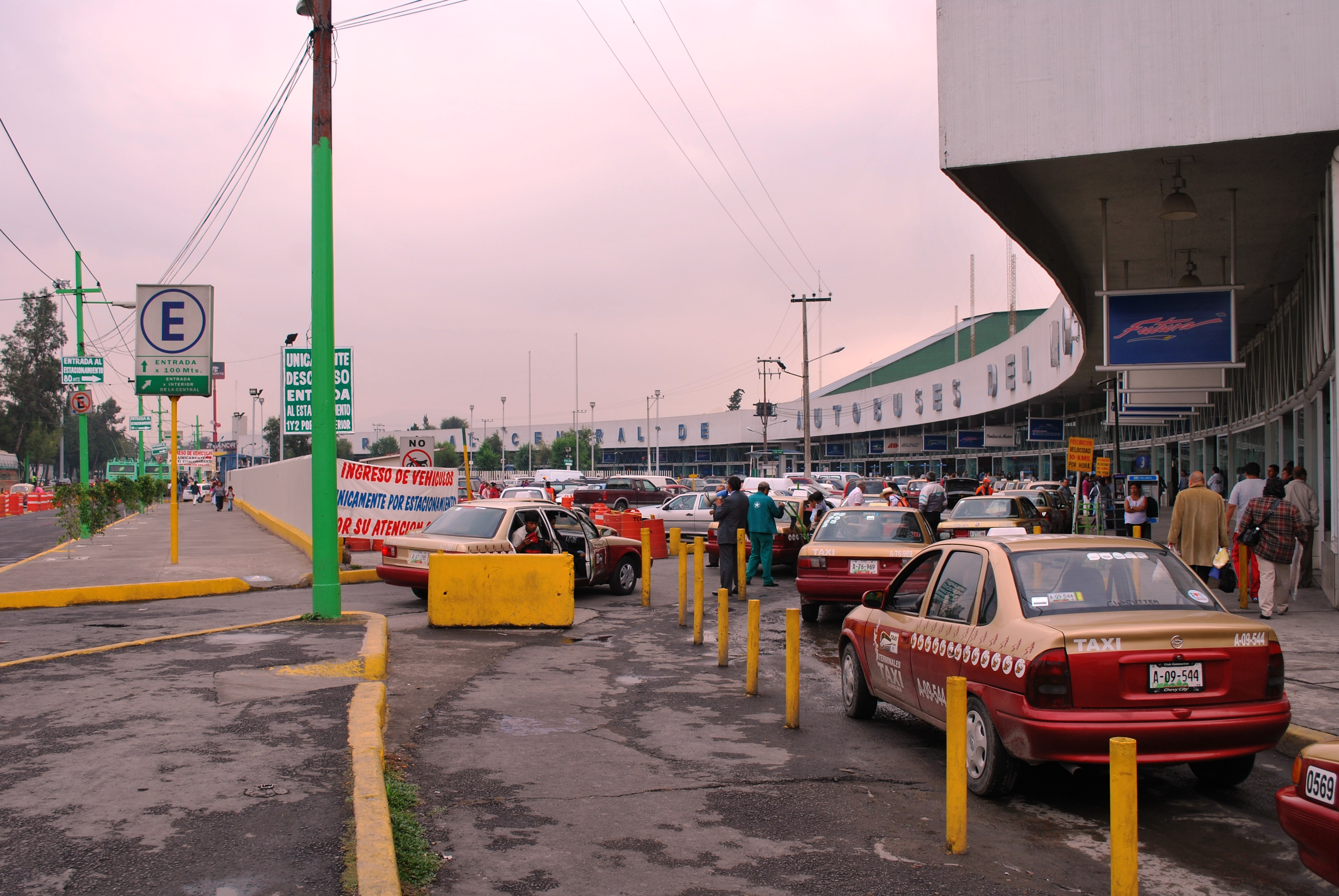
Autobuses del Norte metro station is located next to the Northern Bus Terminal (pictured)

Autobuses del Norte is an at-grade metro station on Line 5 along Eje Central Avenue, in the Colonias ("neighborhoods") of Capultitlan and Ampliación Panamericana, in the Gustavo A. Madero borough, northern Mexico City. The station serves the Northern Bus Terminal, the largest bus terminal in the country. The Northern Bus Station serves destinations in 27 states, with major cities including Acapulco, Guadalajara, Matamoros, Monterrey, San Miguel de Allende, and Tijuana, among others.

The stop has four exits leading onto Eje Central: The eastern exit leads to the bus terminal, in Colonia Capultitlan. The other three stations lead to Colonia Ampliación Panamericana. The northweastern exit goes onto Calle Poniente 118, while the southwestern and southeastern exits connect to Calle Poniente 116. The station offers a limited accessible service with elevators.

Within the system, the station is followed by Instituto del Petróleo and La Raza stations. The metro station is serviced by Line 1 (formerly Line A) of the trolleybus system, by Route 15-A of the city's public bus system, and by Routes 23 and 103 of the Red de Transporte de Pasajeros network.

== History and construction ==
Line 5 of the Mexico City Metro was built by Cometro, a subsidiary of Empresas ICA. The section including Autobuses del Norte metro station formed part of a northward extension from La Raza, and opened on 30 August 1982, while running eastward toward Pantitlán station.

The section between Autobuses del Norte and Instituto del Petróleo station measures 1,067 meters (3,501 ft), while the opposite section toward La Raza station is 975 meters (3,199 ft) long.

In June 2006, Metro authorities replaced the railroad switches. In 2008, authorities had maintenance work done on the station's roof.

=== Name and pictogram ===
The pictogram representing Autobuses del Norte metro station is a silhouette of an intercity bus, representing the adjacent bus terminal.

== Ridership ==
Daily ridership for Autobuses del Norte station in 2024

According to official data, before the impact of the COVID-19 pandemic, the station recorded between 22,400 and 23,800 average daily entries from 2016 to 2019. In 2025, it recorded 6,556,986 passenger entries, ranking 68th among the system's 195 stations.

Annual passenger ridership
| Year | Ridership | Average daily | Rank | % change | Ref. |
|---|---|---|---|---|---|
| 2025 | 6,556,986 | 17,964 | 68/195 | −5.17% | |
| 2024 | 6,914,785 | 18,892 | 55/195 | −0.86% | |
| 2023 | 6,974,950 | 19,109 | 59/195 | +11.92% | |
| 2022 | 6,231,958 | 17,073 | 55/195 | +44.17% | |
| 2021 | 4,322,667 | 11,842 | 69/195 | −3.47% | |
| 2020 | 4,478,099 | 12,235 | 76/195 | −45.92% | |
| 2019 | 8,280,147 | 22,685 | 68/195 | −0.92% | |
| 2018 | 8,357,253 | 22,896 | 69/195 | +1.78% | |
| 2017 | 8,211,462 | 22,497 | 69/195 | −5.42% | |
| 2016 | 8,682,345 | 23,722 | 66/195 | +1.05% | |
