= Terminal Central de Autobuses del Norte =

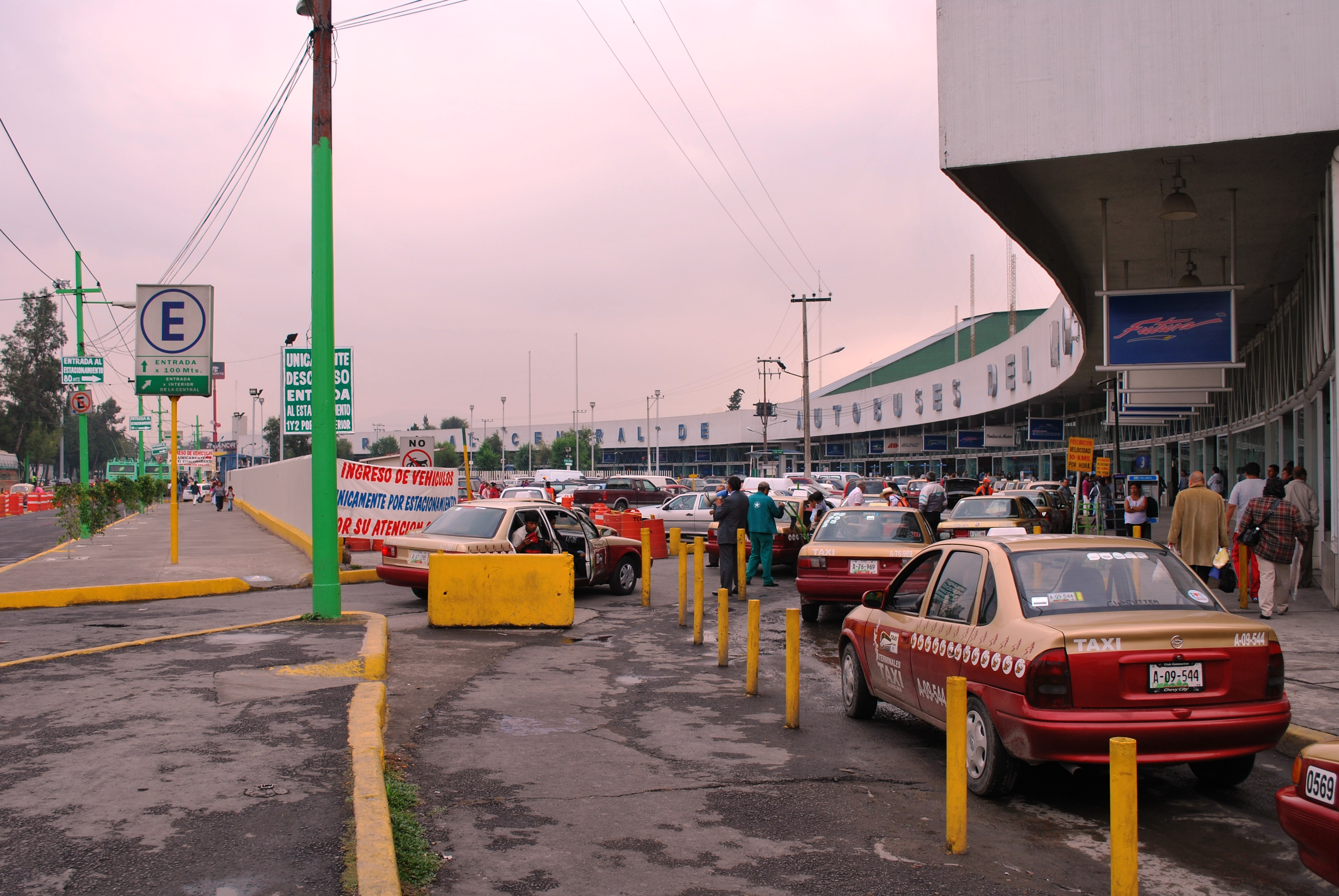
Photographed in 2009

Terminal Central de Autobuses del Norte, officially named Central Camionera Terminal J. Guadalupe López Velarde, is the northern intercity bus station in Mexico City. The bus station was opened in 1973 and cost 120 million Mexican pesos.

== Connections ==
The Autobuses del Norte metro station is adjacent. The trolleybus line 1 stops outside the station. The road Eje Central passes by the station.
