= Colonia Valle Gómez =

Coordinates: 19°27′25.21″N 99°7′8.23″W

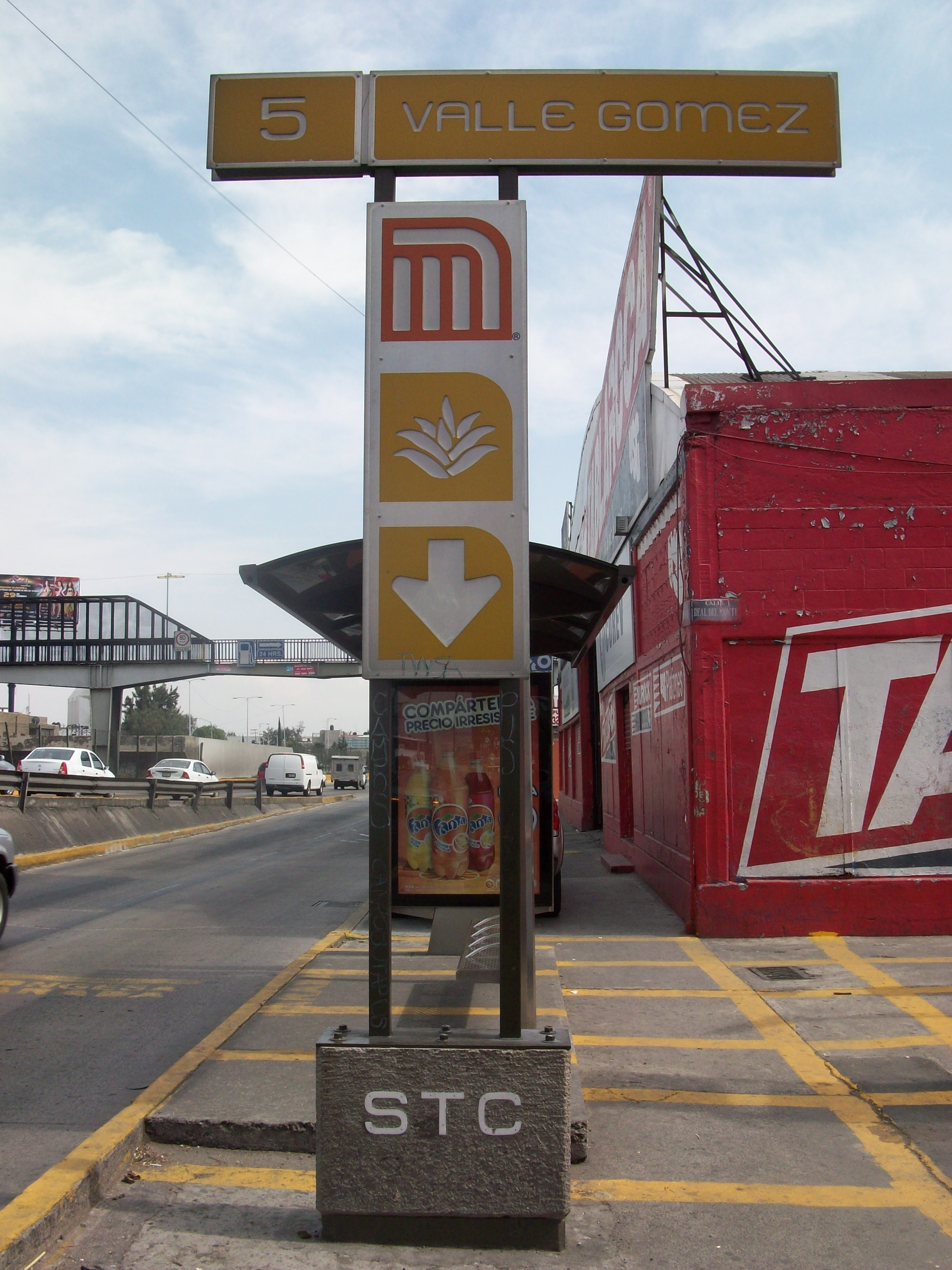
Valle Gómez metro station serves the neighborhood

Colonia Valle Gómez is a colonia or neighborhood in the Venustiano Carranza borough of Mexico City, just north of the city’s historic center. The boundaries of the colonia are marked by the following streets:H.Congreso de la Unión to the east, Ferrocarril Hidalgo to the west, Río Consulado to the north and Platino Street to the south. Schools include Campanitas Preschool (public), Cendi Gdf Mapimi Primary (public), Centro de Estudios Tecnologicos Manchester Technical School (private), Cideco Preschool (private), Felipe Carrillo Puerto Primary (public), and Joaquin Miranda Carreon Primary (private).

The colonia was founded in 1894 when Modesto del Valle and Rafael B. Gomez decided to subdivide the land for housing, using their surnames to name the new development. Prior to then, the land was part of an area known as Potrero de la Villa. Legal problems arose with the development as half of the land was located in the Mexico City municipality and the other in the jurisdiction of Guadalupe Hidalgo (or La Villa). For many years, the Mexico City council did not acknowledge the existence of the colonia. Neighboring Colonia Felipe Pescador and Colonia Maza, also owned by Valle and Gómez, had similar problems. Today, the main issue in this and neighboring colonias is crime, with neighborhood groups pressing the city for more police services and security cameras. The most common crimes include muggings, auto theft, prostitution, and corruption.
