= Potrero metro station =

Mexico City Metro station

Potrero
- The station's sign in 2023

General information
- Location: Avenida de los Insurgentes; Gustavo A. Madero, Mexico City
- Coordinates: 19°28′37″N 99°07′56″W
- System: Mexico City Metro
- Owner: Government of Mexico City
- Operator: Sistema de Transporte Colectivo (STC)
- Platforms: 1 island platform
- Tracks: 2
- Connections: Potrero; Potrero; Route: 15-C; Routes: 25, 104; Various local and intercity service routes

Construction
- Structure type: At grade
- Accessible: Partial

Other information
- Status: In service

History
- Opened: 1 December 1979; 46 years ago

Passengers
- 2025: 4,524,829 (Note: The system's website counts only passenger entries into stations and does not include passengers passing through, transferring between lines, or exiting the station. The data here is limited to the most recent ten years to avoid excessive listings; earlier figures can be found in this page's history or on the Mexico City Metro website. To calculate the average daily ridership, the annual total is divided by 365 days (366 in leap years), with decimals omitted from the result. Each station per line is ranked individually, as the system counts transfer stations separately. The percentage change is calculated automatically using the data from the current year and the previous year.) ▲1.33%
- Rank: 116/195

Services
Preceding station	Mexico City Metro	Following station
Deportivo 18 de Marzo toward Indios Verdes	Line 3	La Raza toward Universidad
Route map
Location
- Location within Mexico City
- Area map and station layout

Potrero metro station (Note: Estación del Metro Potrero. Spanish pronunciation: [poˈtɾeɾo]. The name of the station literally means "Paddock" in Spanish.) is a station of the Mexico City Metro in the city's borough of Gustavo A. Madero. It is an at-grade railway stop with one island platform serving Line 3 (Olive Line), between Deportivo 18 de Marzo and La Raza. It was opened on 1 December 1979, providing service north toward Indios Verdes and south toward Hospital General.

Potrero metro station services the colonias (neighborhoods) of Capultitlan and Guadalupe Insurgentes, along Avenida de los Insurgentes. The station's name references a hippodrome that formerly existed in the area. Its pictogram depicts the silhouette of a horse head behind a fence to reference a paddock. The station offers a limited accessible service with wheelchair ramps.

Outside, there is a transportation hub serving local and intercity routes, and the eponymous Metrobús station serving Lines 1 and 3. In 2025, Potrero metro station had an average daily ridership of 12,396 passenger entries, ranking it the 116th busiest stop in the network.

Since its opening, the station has been the site of several incidents, including a train crash in the southbound tunnel that killed one person and injured 106 others, as well as structural damage caused by local ground subsidence.

== Location and layout ==
Potrero metro station is located on the median strip of Avenida de los Insurgentes.

Potrero is an at-grade metro station on Line 3 along Avenida de los Insurgentes, in the Colonias ("neighborhoods") of Capultitlan and Guadalupe Insurgentes, in the Gustavo A. Madero borough, northern Mexico City. The surrounding area has mixed land use, with industrial areas to the west and residential areas to the east.

The stop has four exits leading onto Avenida de los Insurgentes: The northeastern exit is located at Avenida Victoria, while the southeastern exit goes onto Calle Excélsior, both in Colonia Guadalupe Insurgentes. The northwestern exits connect to Calles Poniente 112 and Poniente 116, both in Colonia Capultitlan. The station offers a limited accessible service with wheelchair ramps.

Within the system, the station lies between Deportivo 18 de Marzo and La Raza. The metro station is serviced by a Centro de transferencia modal (CETRAM), a transportation hub covering an area of 6,614 square meters (71,190 sq ft). The hub provides access to various routes and modes of transportation, including Routes 25 and 104 of the Red de Transporte de Pasajeros (RTP) system as well as Route 15-C of the public bus system. Additionally, Line 1 and Line 3 of the Metrobús service are available at the Potrero bus station.

== History and construction ==
Line 3 of the Mexico City Metro was built by Ingeniería de Sistemas de Transportes Metropolitano, Electrometro, and Cometro, the latter being a subsidiary of Empresas ICA. The section including Potrero metro station formed part of a northward extension from La Raza, and opened on 1 December 1979, while running southward toward Hospital General station.

The section between Potrero and La Raza station descends from street level to the underground level and measures 1,106 meters (3,629 ft), while the opposite section runs at grade toward Deportivo 18 de Marzo station is 715 meters (2,346 ft) long. During the station's construction, remains of horses, mammoths, fish, and birds were uncovered.

=== Name and pictogram ===
The pictogram representing Potrero metro station is a silhouette of a horse's head behind a fence. The station and surrounding area take their name from a former hippodrome that operated during the Porfiriato era (1876–1911), in what is now Colonia Ex Hipódromo de Peralvillo. Its paddocks were located in the northern part of the area.

=== Incidents ===
==== Train crash ====
Entrance to the tunnel toward La Raza station the day of the accident.

Two trains collided inside the Potrero–La Raza interstation tunnel while both headed toward Indios Verdes metro station on 7 January 2023. The accident killed one person and injuring 106 others. Twenty days later, the Mexico City Attorney General's Office attributed the accident to two factors: reported cable theft in the area the previous day and negligent driving by the operator, who had failed to deactivate the autopilot and switch to manual operation in the affected area, as required by the procedure manual. Following the accident, the Mexico City government deployed National Guard personnel to monitor Metro stations, alleging that opponents had sabotaged the system without providing evidence to support the claim. A Metro driver subsequently published a video showing the condition of the tunnel where the crash occurred, showing areas with inadequate lighting.

==== Sinking issues ====
Avenida de los Insurgentes near Potrero station. The avenue has areas with subsidence visible to the naked eye.

According to IUYET, a company contracted by the Metro system to inspect Line 3, the Potrero station building "has a high level of vulnerability due to collapses in the slabs, fractures, and subsidence". The company reported that subsidence has left sections of the tracks unsupported by the slabs, with gaps of up to 60 centimeters (24 in) and annual sinking rates of between 6.87 cm (2.70 in) and 8.83 cm (3.48 in) in the tunnel toward La Raza. By comparison, the section between Potrero and Deportivo 18 de Marzo sinks at rates of between 1.93 cm (0.76 in) and 8.79 cm (3.46 in).

According to geologist Alejandro Salazar Méndez, the passageway connecting the platforms to the entrance lobby may cause the station's caisson to "float" due to Archimedes' principle. He explained that he believes the total weight of the underground passageway is less than the upward buoyant force exerted by the surrounding sediments.

The Metro union also reported "deformation in the slab and the track elements, including rails, guide bars, and insulators, and sinkholes [...] which create problems in train operations and the execution of corrective maintenance work". It also identified deformations in the track section between Potrero and Deportivo 18 de Marzo that cause trains to sway during operation.

==== Other ====
On 14 December 2018, a private vehicle crashed into the walls near the Insurgentes Norte and Victoria entrance after being struck by a public bus; no injuries were reported. On 19 July 2021, a man was stabbed to death in the CETRAM corridors during an apparent robbery.

== Ridership ==
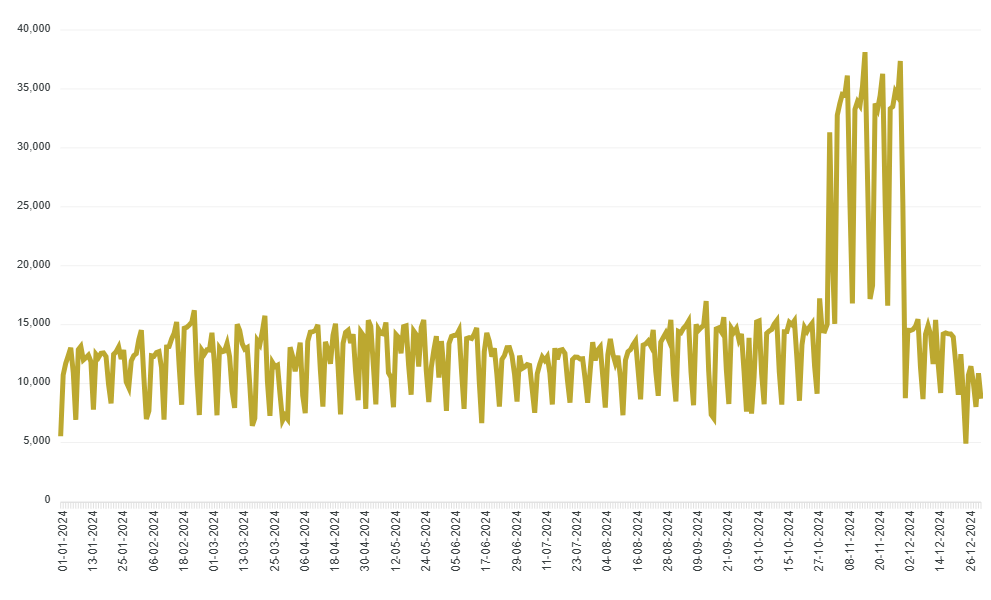
Daily ridership for Potrero station in 2024

According to official data, before the impact of the COVID-19 pandemic, the station recorded between 17,100 and 19,100 average daily entries from 2016 to 2019. In 2025, it recorded 4,524,829 passenger entries, ranking 116th among the system's 195 stations.

Annual passenger ridership
Year	Ridership	Average daily	Rank	% change	Ref.
2025	4,524,829	12,396	116/195	+1.33%	
2024	4,465,441	12,200	111/195	−2.20%	
2023	4,565,663	12,508	103/195	+6.41%	
2022	4,290,556	11,754	101/195	+43.08%	
2021	2,998,686	8,215	108/195	−17.00%	
2020	3,612,909	9,871	103/195	−42.81%	
2019	6,317,545	17,308	106/195	+0.77%	
2018	6,269,063	17,175	106/195	−2.37%	
2017	6,421,265	17,592	104/195	−8.06%	
2016	6,984,359	19,082	93/195	−5.42%	
