= 2023 Mexico City Metro train crash =

2023 railway accident in Mexico City

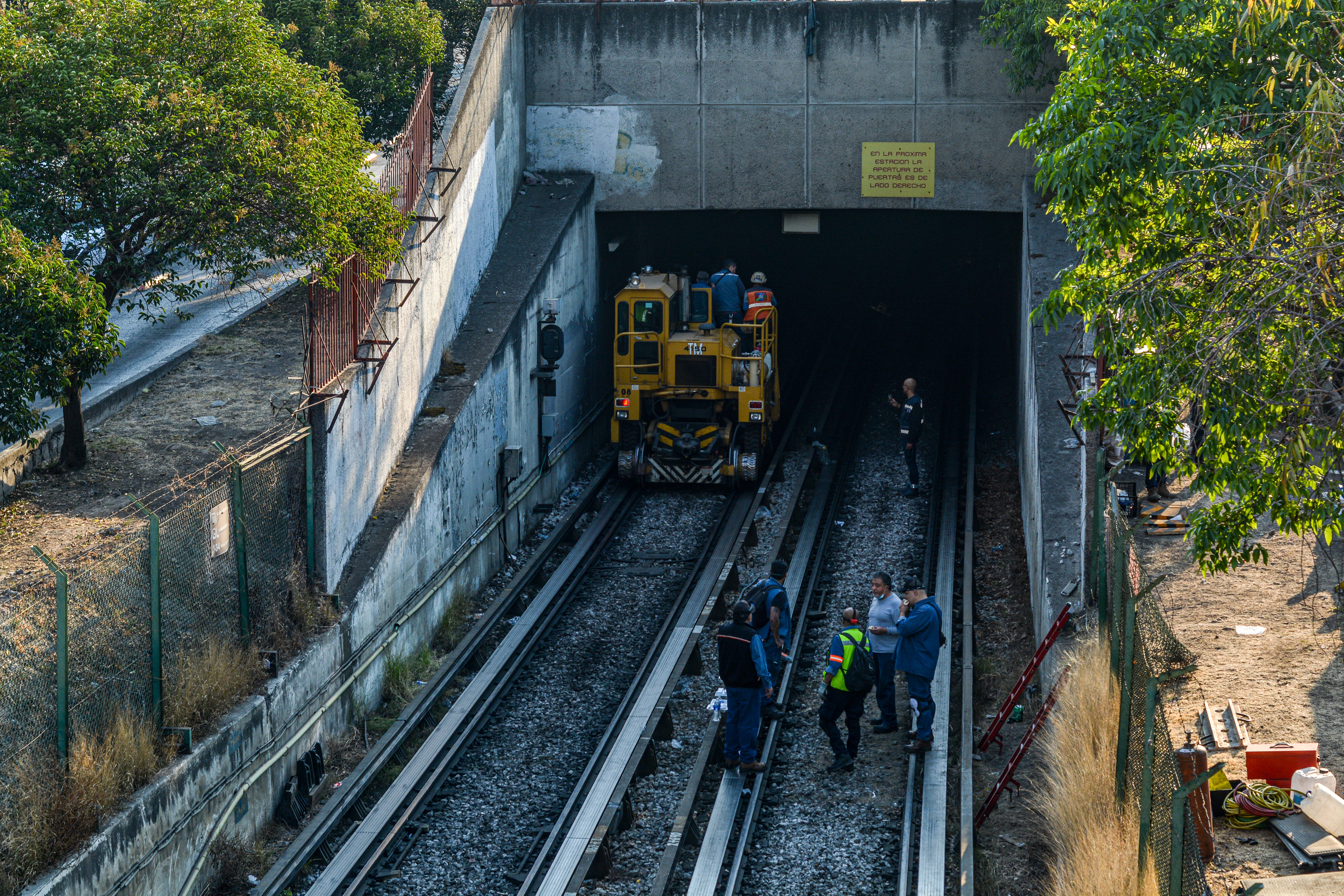
- The crash occurred in the tunnel located between Potrero and La Raza metro stations (tunnel entrance pictured).

Details
- Date: 7 January 2023; 09:16 CDT (UTC-5)
- Location: Potrero–La Raza interstation tunnel Avenida de los Insurgentes, Gustavo A. Madero, Mexico City
- Coordinates: 19°28′26″N 99°08′04.9″W
- Country: Mexico
- Line: Line 3
- Operator: Sistema de Transporte Colectivo (STC)
- Incident type: Train collision
- Cause: Under investigation

Statistics
- Trains: 2
- Crew: 2
- Deaths: 1
- Injured: 106

A train crash occurred on 7 January 2023 at 09:16 CDT (UTC−5) when a Mexico City Metro train going northward towards Indios Verdes metro station crashed into another one that was parked inside the Potrero–La Raza interstation tunnel of Line 3, which runs below Avenida de los Insurgentes. The collision killed one person and injured 106 others, including the driver of the train that crashed.

== Background ==
=== Metro system ===
The Sistema de Transporte Colectivo (STC) operates the Mexico City Metro, one of the busiest in the world, carrying around 4.5 million passengers a day. Commencing operations in 1969, it is the second-largest metro system in North America, after the New York City Subway system.

Prior to the crash, the system had shown signs of deterioration, with general concerns being expressed about its maintenance, which increased after Line 12's overpass collapse in southern Mexico City, which resulted in the deaths of 26 people in 2021. Previous accidents included a train crash at Tacubaya station caused by a train driver who disregarded parking guidelines and caused the train's brakes to fail, and a fire in the Metro's downtown headquarters where a police officer was killed, 30 people resulted hospitalized, and the lengthy suspension of service of six subway lines, including Line 3.

After conducting an investigation into the 2021 collapse of the bridge in Line 12, DNV, the company hired by the city government, came to the conclusion that the overpass collapsed because it was built without quality and safety standards and that buckling of the girders would have been discovered if maintenance checks had been performed. The report was labeled "biased" by Mexico City mayor Claudia Sheinbaum, who also questioned the firm's methodology for concluding that maintenance checks were not performed.

=== Line 3 ===
Line 3, also known as the Olive Line in reference to its color on the system map, runs from the northern borough of Gustavo A. Madero, to the south-central borough of Coyoacán. In 2022, it was the second most used line, servicing 117 million passengers. The line was the third one to be built; Ingeniería de Sistemas de Transportes Metropolitano, Electrometro, and Cometro, the latter a subsidiary of Empresas ICA, constructed it. It was inaugurated on 20 November 1970 by Gustavo Díaz Ordaz and ran from Tlatelolco to Hospital General stations; subsequently, it began a northward expansion, first to La Raza station and eventually to Indios Verdes station, which became its terminus on 1 December 1979.

== Train crash ==
On January 7, 2023, two trains collided between La Raza and Potrero on Metro Line 3.

== See also ==
- 1975 Mexico City Metro train crash
- 2015 Mexico City Metro train crash
