= Politécnico metro station =

Mexico City Metro station

Politécnico
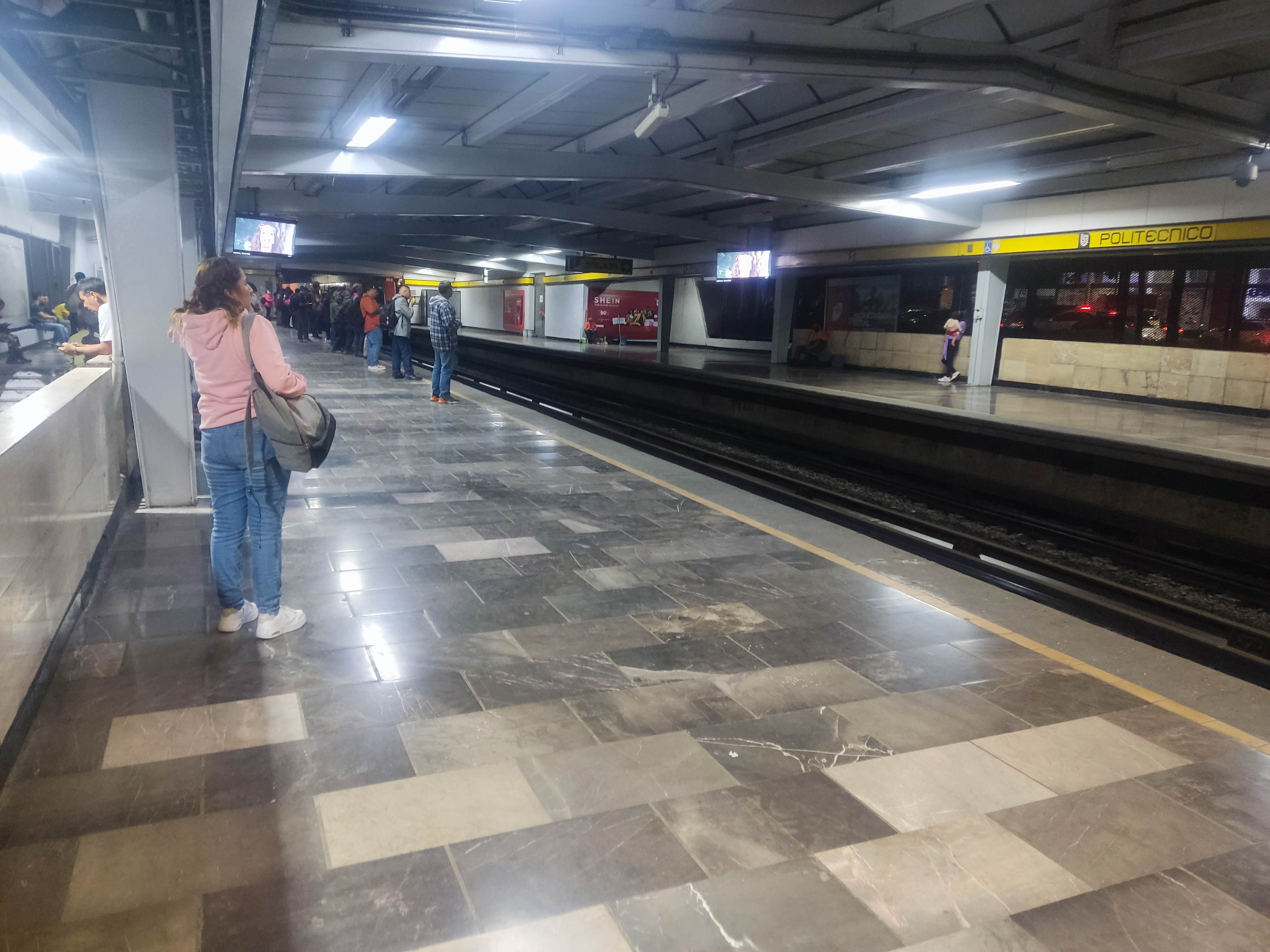
- Platforms, 2025

General information
- Location: Eje Central; Gustavo A. Madero, Mexico City; Mexico
- Coordinates: 19°30′03″N 99°08′57″W
- System: Mexico City Metro
- Owner: Government of Mexico City
- Operator: Sistema de Transporte Colectivo (STC)
- Platforms: 2 side platforms
- Tracks: 2
- Connections: Politécnico; Routes: 23, 103; Trolleybus Line 8: Politécnico Oriente; Trolleybus Line 8: Politécnico Poniente; Various local and intercity service routes

Construction
- Structure type: At grade
- Accessible: Partial

Other information
- Status: In service

History
- Opened: 30 August 1982; 44 years ago

Passengers
- 2025: 8,871,305 (Note: The system's website counts only passenger entries into stations and does not include passengers passing through, transferring between lines, or exiting the station. The data here is limited to the most recent ten years to avoid excessive listings; earlier figures can be found in this page's history or on the Mexico City Metro website. To calculate the average daily ridership, the annual total is divided by 365 days (366 in leap years), with decimals omitted from the result. Each station per line is ranked individually, as the system counts transfer stations separately. The percentage change is calculated automatically using the data from the current year and the previous year.) ▼4.38%
- Rank: 39/195

Services
Preceding station	Mexico City Metro	Following station
Terminus	Line 5	Instituto del Petróleo toward Pantitlán
Route map
Location
- Location within Mexico City
- Area map and exits

Politécnico metro station (Note: Estación del Metro Politécnico. Spanish pronunciation: [poli'teɣ.niko]. The name of the station literally means "Polytechnic" in Spanish, and it is known in English as Polytechnic station.) is a station of the Mexico City Metro in the city's borough of Gustavo A. Madero. Found along Eje Central avenue, it is an at-grade station with two side platforms serving as the northern terminus of Line 5 (Yellow Line), followed by Instituto del Petróleo metro station. Politécnico metro station was inaugurated on 30 August 1982, providing service southeast toward Pantitlán metro station.

Politécnico metro station services the Colonias (neighborhoods) of Industrial Vallejo and Nueva Industrial Vallejo. The station is named after the nearby National Polytechnic Institute (IPN), and the station's pictogram features a stylized version of the institution's logo.

The facilities offer partial accessibility for people with disabilities, including elevators. Inside, there is a mural titled La técnica al servicio de la patria. Outside, there is a transportation hub serving multiple local and intercity bus routes. In 2025, Politécnico metro station had an average daily ridership of 24,304 passenger entries, ranking it the 39th busiest stop in the network.

== Location and layout ==
Politécnico is an at-grade metro station on Line 5 along the median strip of Eje Central avenue, in the Colonias ("neighborhoods") of Industrial Vallejo and Nueva Industrial Vallejo, in the borough of Gustavo A. Madero, northern Mexico City. It services the nearby National Polytechnic Institute (IPN), a public university. Within the system, Instituto del Petróleo is the next station.

The metro station is serviced by a Centro de transferencia modal (CETRAM), a transportation hub that provides access to various routes and modes of transportation. Available transportation options include Line 8 (formerly Line CP) of the trolleybus system, Routes 23 and 103 of the Red de Transporte de Pasajeros network, and local and intercity bus routes. Politécnico metro station has two exits. The west one leads to the CETRAM at Calle Poniente 152, in Colonia Industrial Vallejo, while the opposite exit leads to Calle Diana, in Colonia Nueva Industrial Vallejo. The station offers a partially disabled-accessible service with elevators.

There were plans to have a Cablebús aerial lift station inside the IPN campus, but the project was canceled due to the opposition of students.

=== Landmarks ===
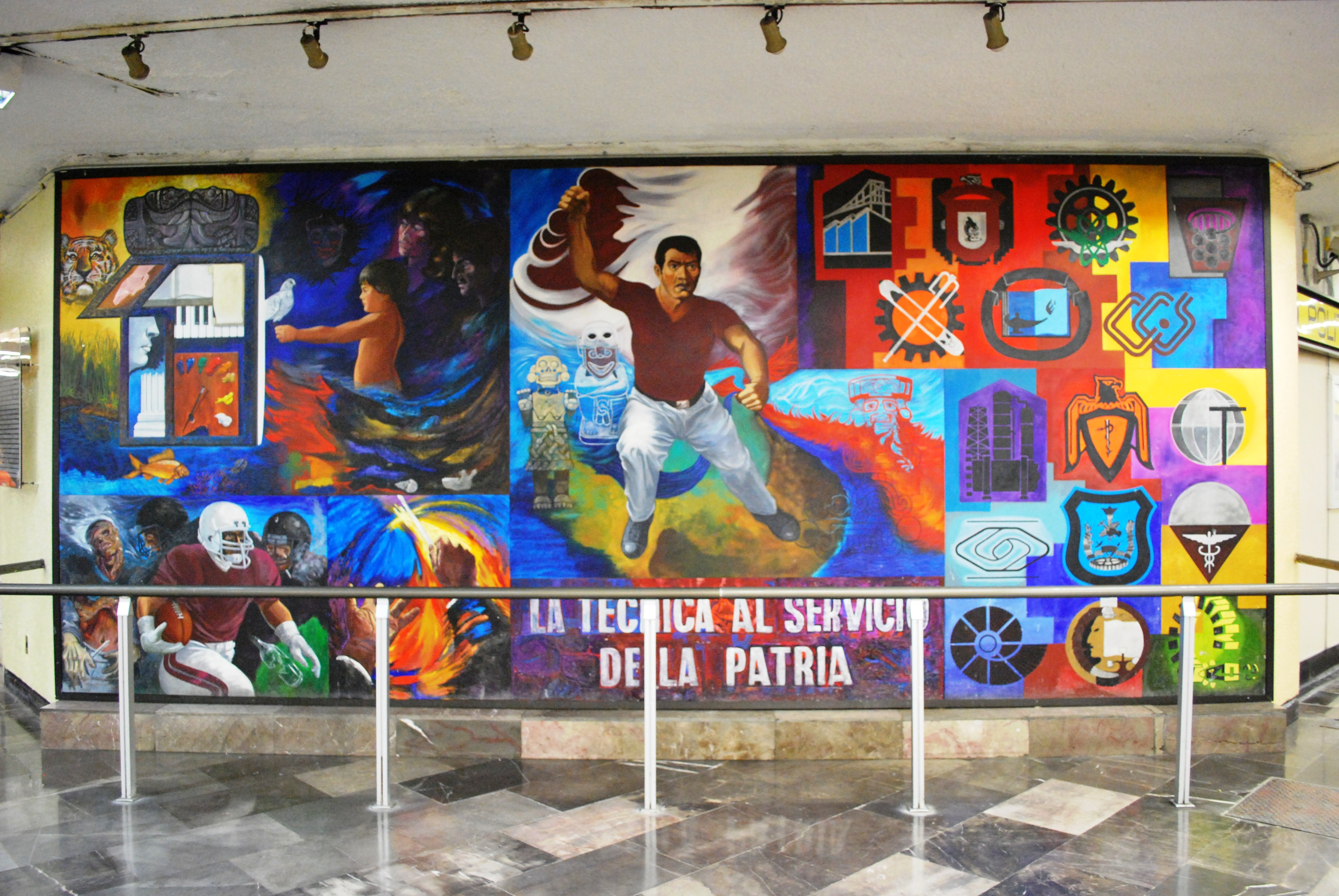
Part of the mural La técnica al servicio de la patria by José Luis Elías Jáuregui

Inside the station, there is a mural named La técnica al servicio de la patria (lit. transl. Technique at the service of the motherland), named after the IPN's motto and painted by José Luis Elías Jáuregui. The mural was inaugurated in 1996 and depicts the history of the IPN, its campus life and culture, the Once TV network logo—the university's TV station—, and an image of Lázaro Cárdenas, the 51st president of Mexico and founder of the institution.

== History and construction ==
Line 5 of the Mexico City Metro was built by Cometro, a subsidiary of Empresas ICA. The latest section opened on 30 August 1982, extending service from La Raza to Politécnico station. The section between Politécnico and Instituto del Petróleo station measures 1,188 meters (3,898 ft).

During the 1980s and 1990s, it was proposed to expand Line 5 northbound from Politécnico metro station toward the area where the Tlalnepantla railway station lies, in the municipality of Tlalnepantla de Baz, in the adjacent State of Mexico. The expansion was proposed again for the 2018 master plan.

In June 2006, Metro authorities replaced the railroad switches; in 2008, authorities carried out maintenance work on the station's roof.

=== Name and pictoram ===
The pictogram representing Politécnico metro station depicts a 2D version of the IPN logo.

=== Incidents ===
On 9 March 2016, two cars derailed when the driver performed a parking maneuver at Politécnico station. One of the tires of the penultimate car jammed in the tracks. Around 200 passengers were aboard the train, and there were no casualties due to the low speed at which it was traveling.

On 8 November 2020, Politécnico, Instituto del Petróleo and Lindavista stations were vandalized during feminist demonstrations. Walls, screens, handrails, and a train were damaged and covered in graffiti, while part of La técnica al servicio de la patria mural was also damaged.

== Ridership ==
Daily ridership for Politécnico station in 2024

According to official data, before the impact of the COVID-19 pandemic, the station recorded between 32,600 and 34,600 average daily entries from 2016 to 2019. In 2025, it recorded 8,871,305 passenger entries, ranking 39th among the system's 195 stations.

Annual passenger ridership
Year	Ridership	Average daily	Rank	% change	Ref.
2025	8,871,305	24,304	39/195	−4.38%	
2024	9,278,142	25,350	36/195	−2.21%	
2023	9,487,376	25,992	28/195	+19.74%	
2022	7,923,455	21,708	35/195	+36.86%	
2021	5,789,532	15,861	37/195	−13.55%	
2020	6,696,893	18,297	36/195	−46.95%	
2019	12,624,212	34,586	28/195	+1.51%	
2018	12,436,525	34,072	28/195	+4.36%	
2017	11,917,506	32,650	34/195	−1.00%	
2016	12,038,043	32,890	34/195	−6.16%	
