= Trolleybuses in Mexico City =

Transit system in Mexico City

Coordinates: 19°26′N 99°08′W

Mexico City trolleybus system

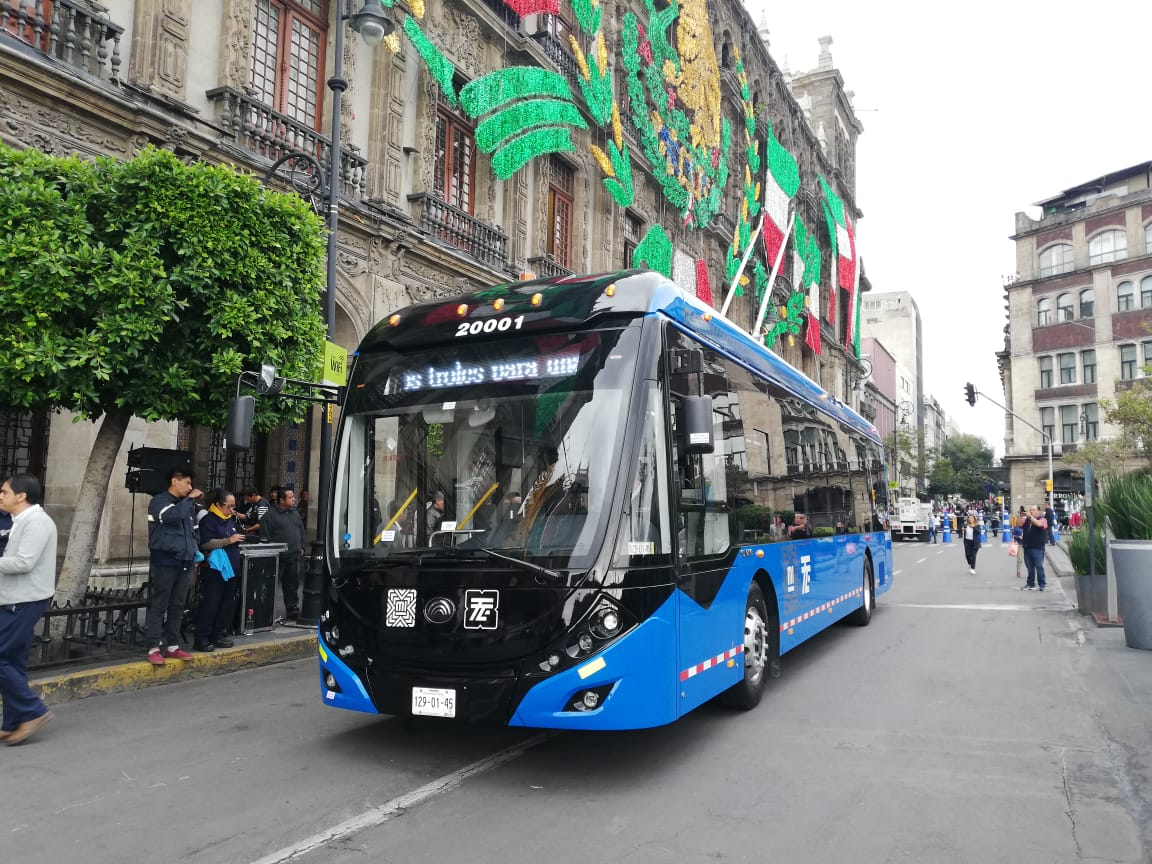
- Yutong ZK5120C model of trolleybus

Operation
- Locale: Mexico City, Mexico
- Open: 9 March 1951
- Status: Open
- Routes: 14 (as of 2026)
- Operator: Servicio de Transportes Eléctricos (STE)

Infrastructure
- Electrification: Parallel overhead lines, 600 V DC

Statistics
- Route length: 203.64 km (126.54 mi)
Overview
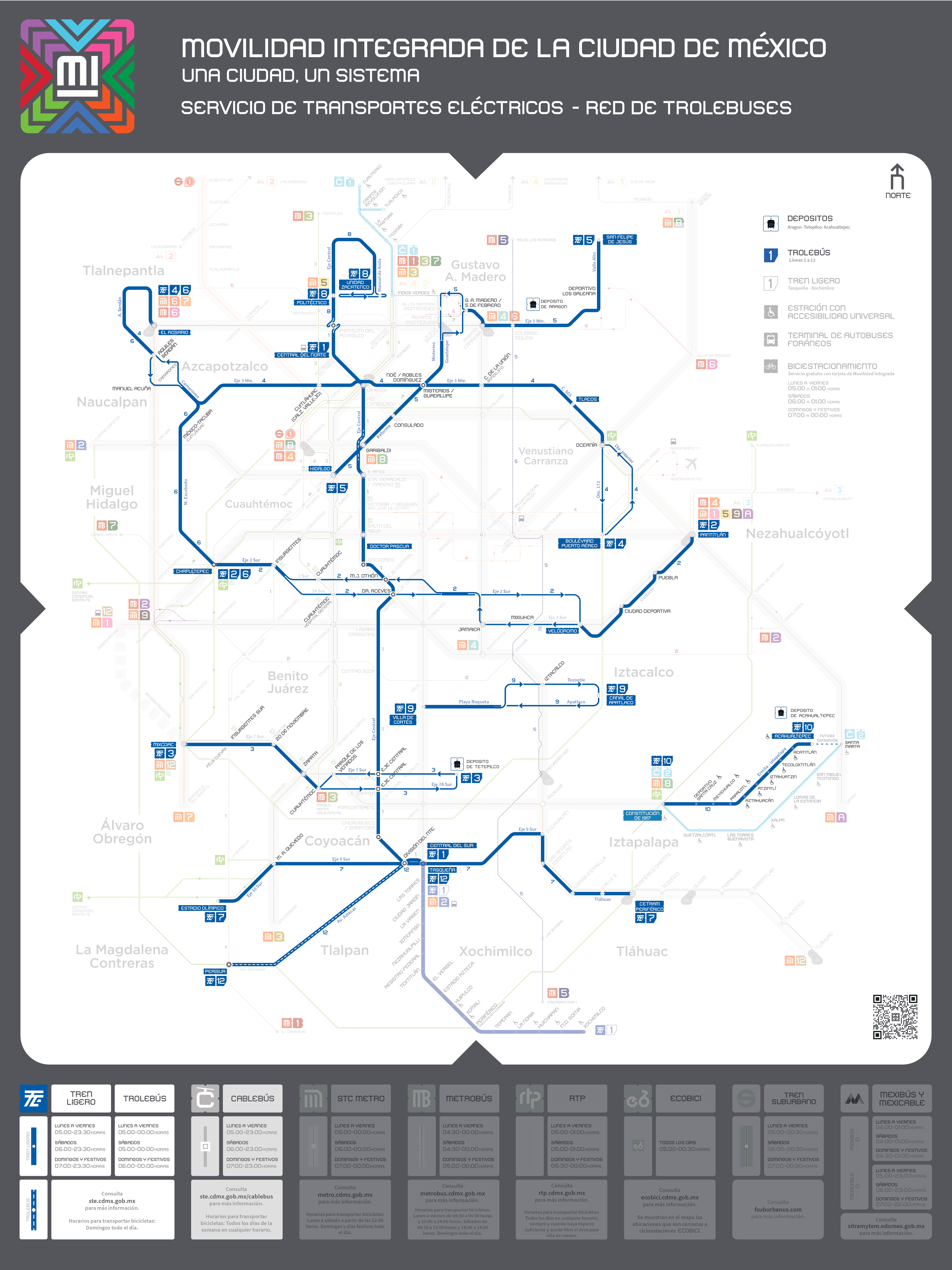
- Website: www.ste.cdmx.gob.mx

The Mexico City trolleybus system (Spanish: Red de Trolebuses de la Ciudad de México) is a trolleybus network serving Mexico City. It is operated by Servicio de Transportes Eléctricos (STE), which also operates the Mexico City Light Rail and Cablebús systems. Along with other public transportation services, including the Mexico City Metro, Metrobús, and Mexibús, it forms part of the Mexico City Integrated Mobility System.

The system opened on 9 March 1951. As of 2026, it comprises 14 routes, some of which operate on dedicated corridors with characteristics similar to bus rapid transit (BRT) systems. Until 2019, the routes were identified by letters, after which numbered route designations were adopted.

Beginning in 2019, the system underwent a major modernization and expansion program under the administration of Claudia Sheinbaum. The program included the purchase of new battery-equipped trolleybuses manufactured by Yutong in China to replace vehicles dating from the 1980s and 1990s. The new vehicles can operate both from the system's 600 V DC parallel overhead lines and independently using onboard batteries, allowing them to travel up to 100 kilometres (62 mi) away from wired infrastructure.

== Lines ==
Line	Formerly	Route	Length km (mi)
1	A	Metro Autobuses del Norte – Autobuses del Sur	36.6 (22.7)
2	S	Metro Pantitlán – Metro Chapultepec	18.0 (11.2)
3	D	San Andrés Tetepilco – Metro Mixcoac	12.3 (7.6)
4	G	Metro Boulevard Puerto Aéreo – Metro El Rosario	44.9 (27.9)
5	LL	San Felipe de Jesús – Metro Hidalgo	26.1 (16.2)
6	I	Metro El Rosario – Metro Chapultepec	30.2 (18.8)
7	K1	Ciudad Universitaria – CETRAM Periférico Oriente	24.5 (15.2)
8	CP	Circuito Politécnico (Metro Politécnico – Instituto Politécnico Nacional)	11.0 (6.8)
9	M	Metro Villa de Cortés – Río Churubusco / Metro Apatlaco	10.0 (6.2)
10	–	Metro Constitución de 1917 – Metro Santa Marta	8.0 (5.0)
11	–	Metro Santa Marta – Chalco	18.5 (11.5)
12	–	Perisur – Tasqueña	14.6 (9.1)
13	–	Metro Constitución de 1917 – Metro Mixcoac	29.6 (18.4)
14	–	CETRAM Universidad – CETRAM Huipulco	13.2 (8.2)

Lines 1 to 7 are cross-city routes, of which 3, 4, and 7 are tangential routes, not reaching the city centre and generally oriented perpendicular to radial routes ("crosstown" route in American English). Line 9 is a short tangential route that is not "cross-city". Line 8 is a "feeder" route, feeding the city's metro system at Politécnico station and also line 1.

On October 29, 2022, line 10 was inaugurated from Metro Constitución de 1917 to Acahualtepec. The section from Acahualtepec to Metro Santa Marta was inaugurated in May 2025.

== Interactive map ==
Trolleybus lines of Mexico City. Numbers and colors match the table above. Route geometry © OpenStreetMap contributors.

== See also ==
- List of trolleybus systems
