= Colonia (Mexico) =

Term for neighborhood in Mexico

In Mexican urban geography, colonias (Spanish pronunciation: [koˈlonjas]) are neighborhoods, although there is a distinction between them and other neighborhoods known as barrios. After a 2011 decree to promote tourism, certain neighborhoods are also called barrios if they have a long tradition and a certain cultural cachet. Other than that there is no geographic difference between colonias and barrios.

The name of the colonia must be specified when writing a postal address in Mexican cities. Usually colonias are assigned a specific postal code; nonetheless, in recent urban developments, gated communities are also defined as colonias and share the postal code of adjacent neighborhoods.

Colonias do not have jurisdictional autonomy or representation.

== Origin ==
The origin of the term colonia is unknown. In the nineteenth century, the first planned urban settlement in the outskirts of Mexico City, called Colonia de los Arquitectos (present-day Colonia San Rafael), used this term to designate a grouping of parcels of land. According to the writer Vicente Quirarte, the word originates from French invaders during the Second Mexican Empire. Their settlement was known as a French "colony." After the expulsion of the French Army, the place name was changed to México Nuevo, but the custom of calling it a "colony" continued. Later residential developments were called colonias regardless of whether or not their origin was foreign.

This meaning of colonia comes first in the dictionary of El Colegio de México, in contrast with the Royal Spanish Academy's dictionary, which places this definition in the tenth position, highlighting its particularity in the Mexican variety of Spanish.

== See also ==
- Barrio
- Barrios Mágicos
- Colonias of Mexico City
