= Balbuena metro station =

Mexico City Metro station

Balbuena
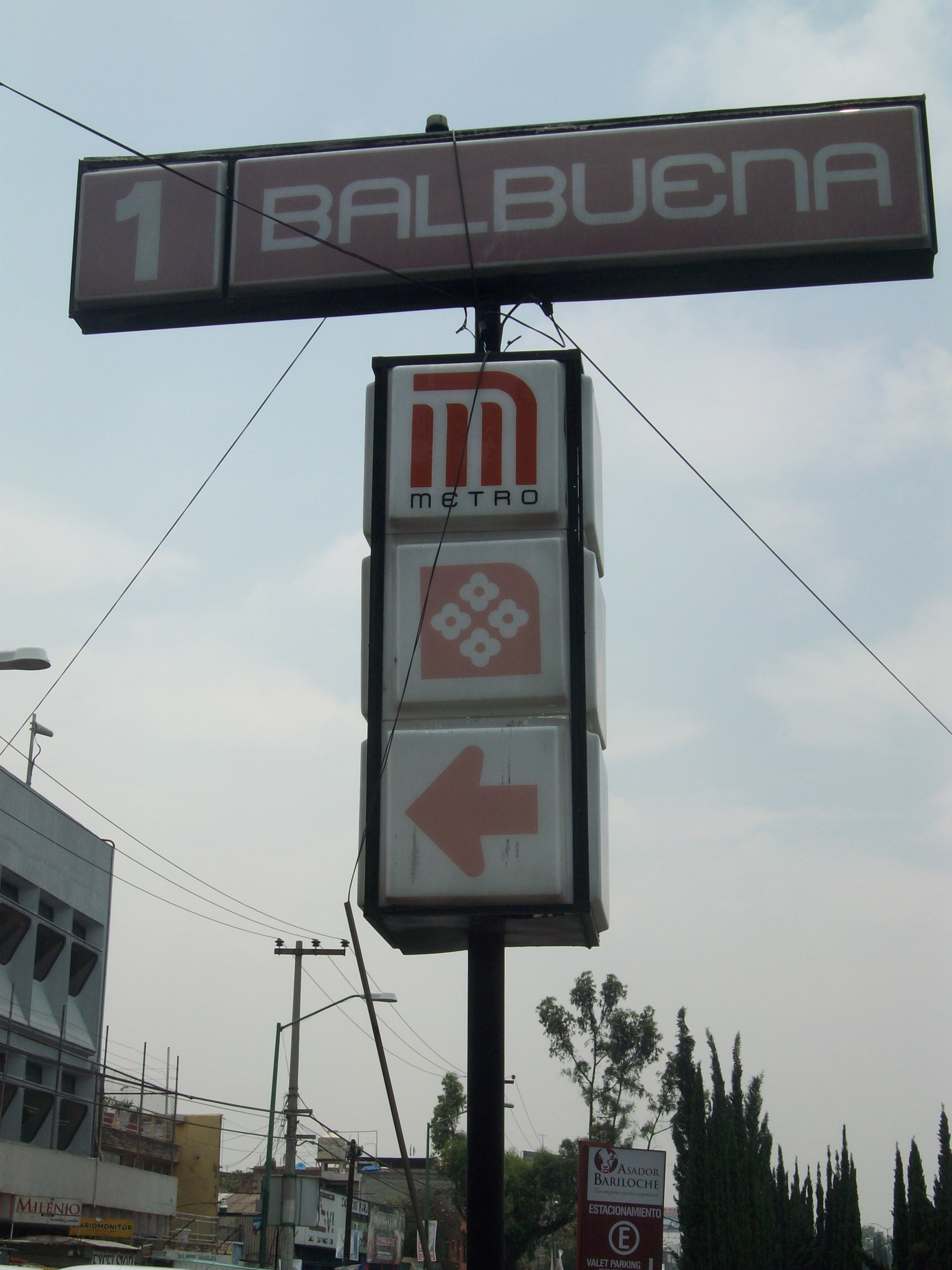
- Station sign, 2012

General information
- Location: Calzada Ignacio Zaragoza; Venustiano Carranza, Mexico City; Mexico
- Coordinates: 19°25′23″N 99°06′08″W
- System: Mexico City Metro
- Owner: Government of Mexico City
- Operator: Sistema de Transporte Colectivo (STC)
- Platforms: 2 side platforms
- Tracks: 2
- Connections: Balbuena; Various local bus service routes

Construction
- Structure type: Underground
- Accessible: Yes

Other information
- Status: In service

History
- Opened: 5 September 1969; 57 years ago

Key dates
- 11 July 2022: Temporarily closed
- 29 October 2023: Reopened

Passengers
- 2025: 2,671,330 (Note: The system's website counts only passenger entries into stations and does not include passengers passing through, transferring between lines, or exiting the station. The data here is limited to the most recent ten years to avoid excessive listings; earlier figures can be found in this page's history or on the Mexico City Metro website. To calculate the average daily ridership, the annual total is divided by 365 days (366 in leap years), with decimals omitted from the result. Each station per line is ranked individually, as the system counts transfer stations separately. The percentage change is calculated automatically using the data from the current year and the previous year.) ▲23.57%
- Rank: 159/195

Services
Preceding station	Mexico City Metro	Following station
Moctezuma toward Observatorio	Line 1	Boulevard Puerto Aéreo toward Pantitlán
Route map
Location
- Location within Mexico City
- Area map and exits

Balbuena metro station (Note: Estación del Metro Balbuena. Spanish pronunciation: [balˈβwena]) is a station of the Mexico City Metro in the city's borough of Venustiano Carranza. It is an underground stop with two side platforms serving Line 1 (Pink Line) between Moctezuma and Boulevard Puerto Aéreo. It was inaugurated on 4 September 1969, and opened the following day, providing service west toward Chapultepec and service east toward Zaragoza.

Balbuena metro station services the colonias (neighborhoods) of Jardín Balbuena and Moctezuma 1ª sección, along Calzada Ignacio Zaragoza. Its pictogram depicts the silhouette of four four-petaled flowers, symbolizing the Balbuena Garden in the neighborhood of the same name, from which the station takes its name. The station facilities offer accessibility for people with disabilities, featuring elevators, escalators, tactile paving, and wheelchair ramps. Outside, there is a transportation hub servicing local bus routes.

It was closed from July 2022 to October 2023 due to modernization works on the tunnel and the line's technical equipment. In 2025, Balbuena metro station had an average daily ridership of 7,318 passenger entries, ranking it the 159th busiest station in the network.

== Location and layout ==
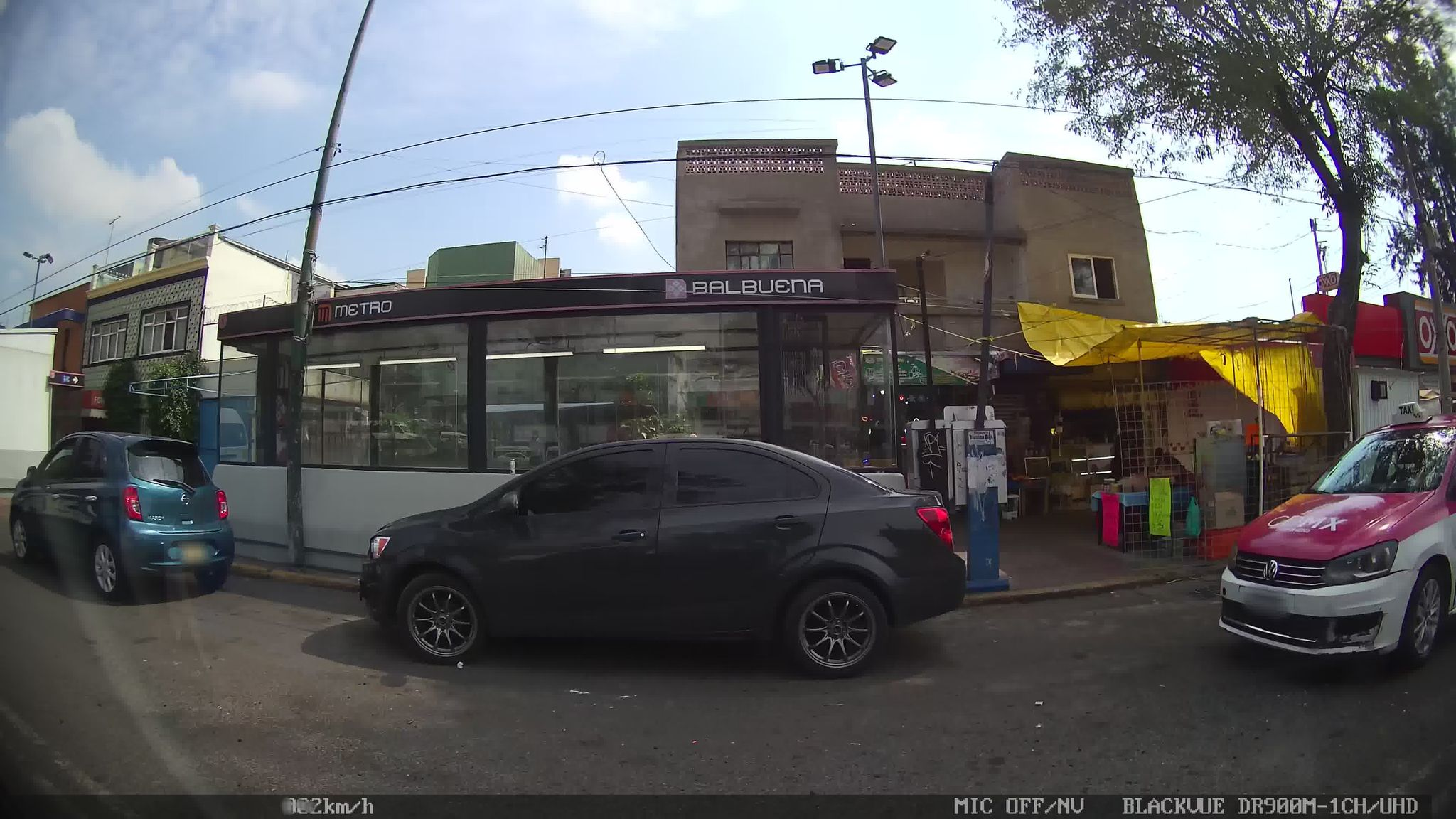
The northern entrance in 2020

Balbuena is an underground metro station on Line 1 located along Calzada Ignacio Zaragoza, in the Colonias (neighborhoods), Jardín Balbuena and Moctezuma 1ª sección, in the Venustiano Carranza borough, eastern Mexico City.

Balbuena metro station has two exits leading to Calzada Ignacio Zaragoza. The north exit is near Calle 17 in Colonia Moctezuma 1ª sección, and the south one at the corner of Avenida de la Portilla in Colonia Jardín Balbuena. The building offers accessible service for people with disabilities with elevators, escalators, wheelchair ramps and tactile paving.

Balbuena metro station is located between Moctezuma and Boulevard Puerto Aéreo stations on the line. The area receives service from the adjacent Centro de transferencia modal (CETRAM), the stop's transportation hub, which connects to various transit routes.

== History and construction ==
Line 1 of the Mexico City Metro was built by Ingeniería de Sistemas de Transportes Metropolitano, Electrometro and Cometro, the latter being a subsidiary of Empresas ICA. Its first section, where Balbuena metro station is located, was inaugurated on 4 September 1969, running from Chapultepec to Zaragoza metro stations, and opened to the general public the following day. The tunnel between Balbuena and Boulevard Puerto Aéreo spans 595 meters (1,952 ft), while the section towards Moctezuma measures 703 meters (2,306 ft).

Balbuena metro station underwent renovation works in 2016, which included the installation of antibacterial porcelain panels and LED lighting. In addition, leaks were sealed and electrical panels were replaced as part of the upgrade. The station was closed on 11 July 2022 for modernization work on the line's tunnel and technical equipment. After fifteen months of renovations, authorities reopened Balbuena station on 29 October 2023. Excélsior reported in July 2024 that all the modernized stations had leaks of varying dimensions, with containers placed under the leaks at Balbuena station. Authorities had previously stated that these leaks would be sealed during the 2022 modernization works.

=== Name and pictogram ===
The station's pictogram depicts the silhouette of four four-petaled flowers, representing the nearby Jardín Balbuena park, which was named after Bernardo de Balbuena, a Spanish poet known for his work "La grandeza mexicana" ('The Grandeur of Mexico').

=== Incidents ===
On 20 January 2021, the station experienced a sewage flood due to a sump system failure attributed to power outages caused by the Central Control Center fire that had occurred two weeks earlier.

== Ridership ==
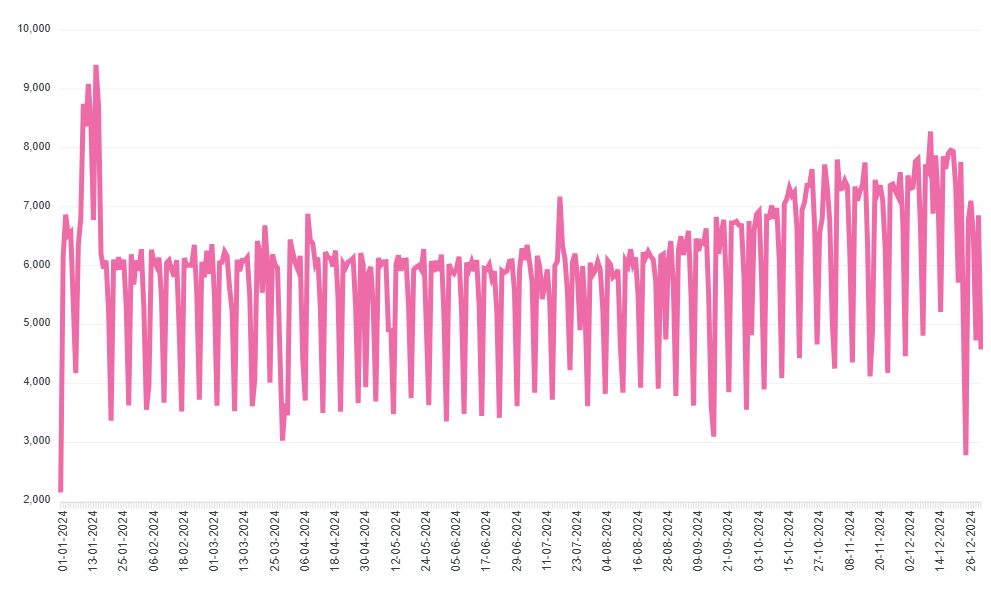
Daily ridership for Balbuena station in 2024

According to official data, before the impact of the COVID-19 pandemic, the station recorded between 12,400 and 13,600 average daily entries from 2016 to 2019. In 2025, it recorded 2,671,330 passenger entries, ranking 159th among the system's 195 stations.

Annual passenger ridership
Year	Ridership	Average daily	Rank	% change	Ref.
2025	2,671,330	7,318	159/195	+23.57%	
2024	2,161,715	5,096	167/195	+476.23%	
2023	375,147	1,027	187/195	−76.64%	
2022	1,606,016	4,400	164/195	−28.50%	
2021	2,246,042	6,153	131/195	−17.85%	
2020	2,734,008	7,469	125/195	−44.23%	
2019	4,902,639	13,431	133/195	+2.33%	
2018	4,791,005	13,126	130/195	+5.27%	
2017	4,551,153	12,468	132/195	−7.92%	
2016	4,942,850	13,505	125/195	−3.00%	
