= Boulevard Puerto Aéreo metro station =

Mexico City Metro station

Boulevard Puerto Aéreo
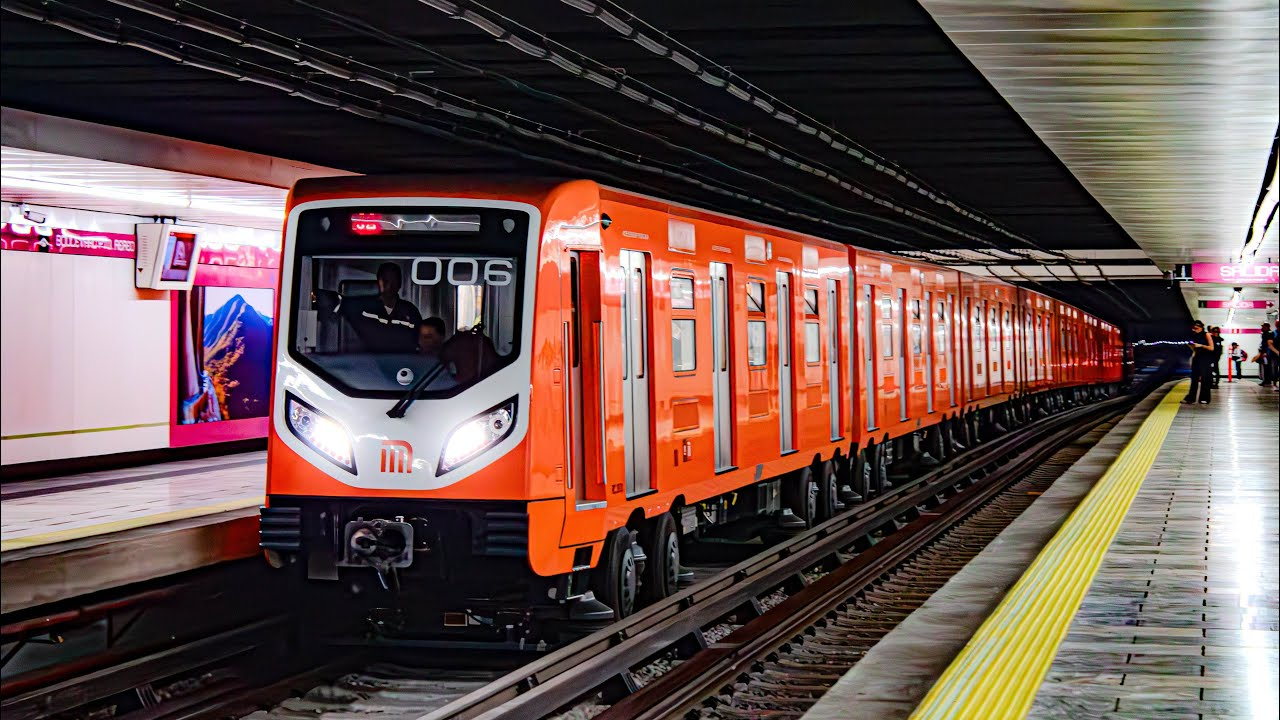
- Platforms, 2024

General information
- Location: Puerto Aéreo Boulevard and Calzada Ignacio Zaragoza; Venustiano Carranza, Mexico City; Mexico
- Coordinates: 19°25′11″N 99°05′45″W
- System: Mexico City Metro
- Owner: Government of Mexico City
- Operator: Sistema de Transporte Colectivo (STC)
- Platforms: 2 side platforms
- Tracks: 2
- Connections: Puerto Aéreo; Route 43; Trolleybus Line 4: Boulevard Puerto Aéreo; Route: 20-B; Various local service routes

Construction
- Structure type: Underground
- Accessible: Partial

Other information
- Status: In service

History
- Opened: 5 September 1969; 57 years ago
- Former names: Aeropuerto

Key dates
- 11 July 2022: Temporarily closed
- 29 October 2023: Reopened

Passengers
- 2025: 5,919,006 (Note: The system's website counts only passenger entries into stations and does not include passengers passing through, transferring between lines, or exiting the station. The data here is limited to the most recent ten years to avoid excessive listings; earlier figures can be found in this page's history or on the Mexico City Metro website. To calculate the average daily ridership, the annual total is divided by 365 days (366 in leap years), with decimals omitted from the result. Each station per line is ranked individually, as the system counts transfer stations separately. The percentage change is calculated automatically using the data from the current year and the previous year.) ▲16.1%
- Rank: 81/195

Services
Preceding station	Mexico City Metro	Following station
Balbuena toward Observatorio	Line 1	Gómez Farías toward Pantitlán
Route map
Location
- Location within Mexico City
- Area map and exits

Boulevard Puerto Aéreo metro station (Note: Estación del Metro Boulevard Puerto Aéreo. Spanish pronunciation: [buleˈβaɾ(ð) ˈpweɾto aˈeɾeo]. The name of the station literally means "Air Port Boulevard" in Spanish.) is a station of the Mexico City Metro in the city's borough of Venustiano Carranza. It is an underground stop two side platforms, serving Line 1 (Pink Line) between Balbuena and Gómez Farías. It was inaugurated on 4 September 1969, and opened the following day, providing service west toward Chapultepec and service east toward Zaragoza. Boulevard Puerto Aéreo metro station originally operated as Aeropuerto (Note: Estación del Metro Aeropuerto. Spanish pronunciation: [a.e.ɾoˈpweɾ.to]. The former name of the station literally meant "Airport" in Spanish.) with west service toward Chapultepec and east service toward Zaragoza.

Its former name referenced the station's proximity to Mexico City International Airport at the time of its opening, and its first pictogram depicted the silhouette of an airliner. However, when Terminal Aérea station opened in 1981 next to the airport, it assumed that function. Due to continuing confusion among travelers, the station's name and logo were changed in 1997. The pictogram for Boulevard Puerto Aéreo metro station features the silhouette of an air vent under a road bridge, representing a landmark found at the junction of Calzada Ignacio Zaragoza and Boulevard Puerto Aéreo avenues, from which the station takes its name.

The stop services the colonias (neighborhoods) of Moctezuma, Santa Cruz Aviación, and Valentín Gómez Farías. Its facilities offer accessibility for people with disabilities, including elevators and tactile paving. Outside, the station receives services from a transportation hub that connects to multiple local bus routes.

Boulevard Puerto Aéreo metro station was closed from July 2022 to October 2023 due to modernization works on the tunnel and the line's technical equipment. In 2025, the station had an average daily ridership of 16,216 passenger entries, ranking it the 81st busiest station in the network.

== Location and layout ==
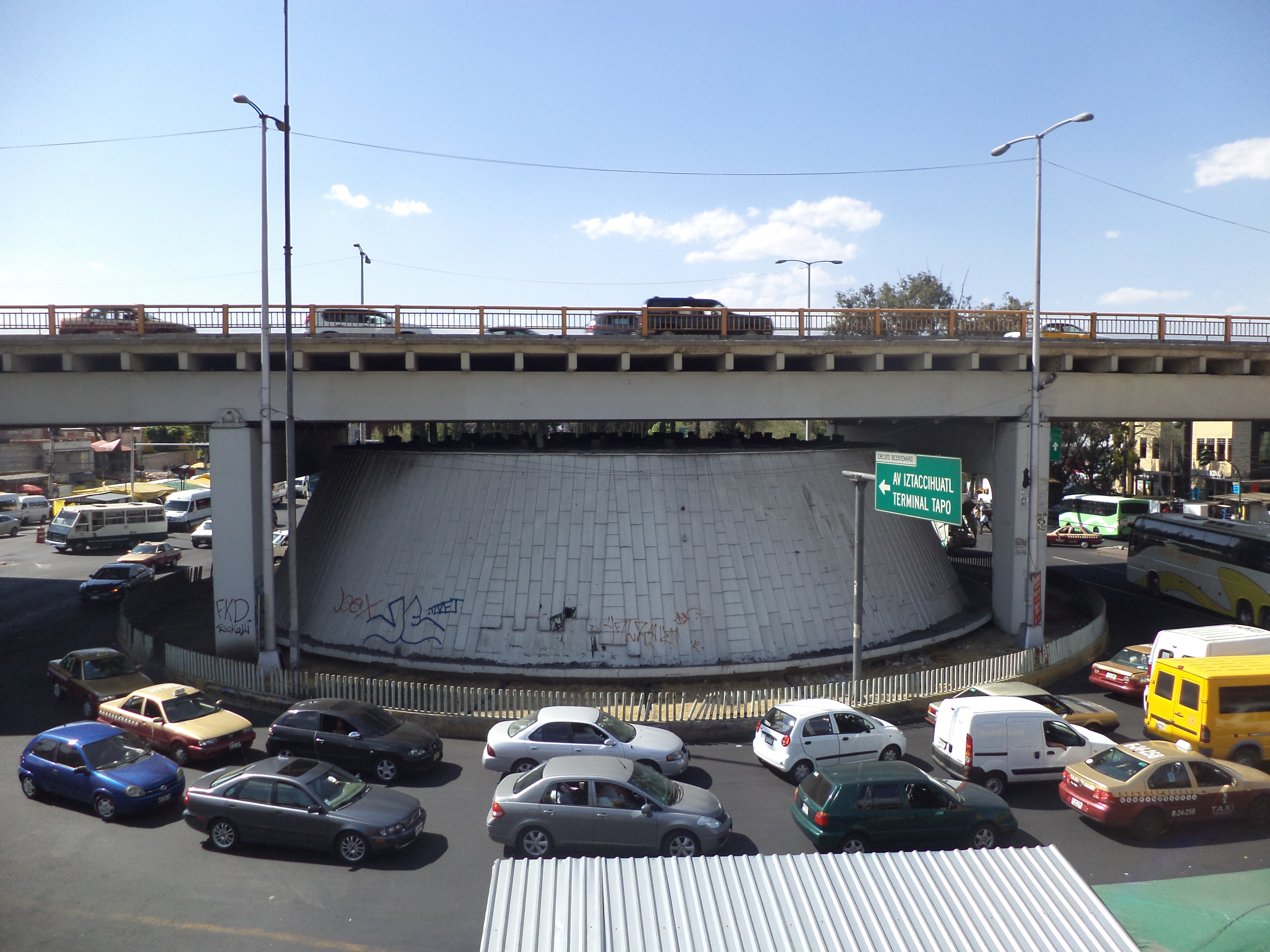
The station's pictogram depicts the intersection of Puerto Aéreo Boulevard (above) and Calzada Ignacio Zaragoza (below).

Boulevard Puerto Aéreo is an underground metro station on Line 1 situated along the avenue of the same name and Calzada Ignacio Zaragoza, in the Colonias (neighborhoods), Moctezuma, Santa Cruz Aviación, and Valentín Gómez Farías, in the Venustiano Carranza borough, eastern Mexico City.

Boulevard Puerto Aéreo metro station has five exits leading to Boulevard Puerto Aéreo and one to Calzada Ignacio Zaragoza. The north and northeast exits serve Colonia Santa Cruz Aviación, while the northwest exit services Colonia Moctezuma. The south and southwest serve Colonia Valentín Gómez Farías along the boulevard, and the southeast entrance serves this neighborhood along Calzada Ignacio Zaragoza. The station offers an accessible service for people with disabilities with elevators and tactile paving.

Within the metro system, the station lies between Balbuena and Gómez Farías. The area receives service from the adjacent Centro de transferencia modal (CETRAM), the stop's transportation hub, which connects to various transit routes, Line 4 (formerly Line G) of the trolleybus system, Route 43 of the Red de Transporte de Pasajeros bus network, and Route 20-B of the city's public bus system.

== History and construction ==
Line 1 of the Mexico City Metro was built by Ingeniería de Sistemas de Transportes Metropolitano, Electrometro and Cometro, the latter being a subsidiary of Empresas ICA. Its first section, where Boulevard Puerto Aéreo metro station is located, was inaugurated on 4 September 1969, operating from Chapultepec to Zaragoza, and opened to the general public the following day. The tunnel between Boulevard Puerto Aéreo and Gómez Farías spans 611 meters (2,005 ft) in length, while the section towards Balbuena measures 595 meters (1,952 ft).

In 2016, the station received renovation works that included repairs to ticket offices, floors, walls, ceilings, electrical installations, lighting, paging system and video surveillance system.

The station was closed on 11 July 2022 for modernization work on the tunnel and technical equipment of the line. After fifteen months of renovations, authorities reopened Boulevard Puerto Aéreo station on 29 October 2023. Excélsior reported in July 2024 that all the modernized stations had leaks of varying severity, with water seepage detected in the walls of Boulevard Puerto Aéreo metro station, resulting in constant runoff into the drains. This issue left damp marks and affected the facilities. Authorities had previously stated that these leaks would be sealed during the 2022 modernization works.

=== Name and pictogram ===
A pictogram similar to the old one that was changed to avoid confusion among the commuters.

Originally, Boulevard Puerto Aéreo was named Aeropuerto due to its proximity – approximately 15 blocks – to Mexico City International Airport, and its pictogram displayed an airliner. In 1981, Terminal Aérea station on Line 5 (Yellow Line) was built closer to the airport. Despite this, confusion persisted as passengers continued to alight at Aeropuerto station because of its name and pictogram. It was until 1997 that Aeropuerto metro station was renamed "Boulevard Puerto Aéreo" and its pictogram was replaced with an image depicting a road bridge with a dome beneath it, symbolizing a nearby air vent designed to prevent street garbage from entering the platforms.

=== Incidents ===
On 2 June 2021, the station received a bomb threat. After six hours of inspection, the Mexico City Secretariat of Citizen Security determined that no explosives were found.

== Ridership ==
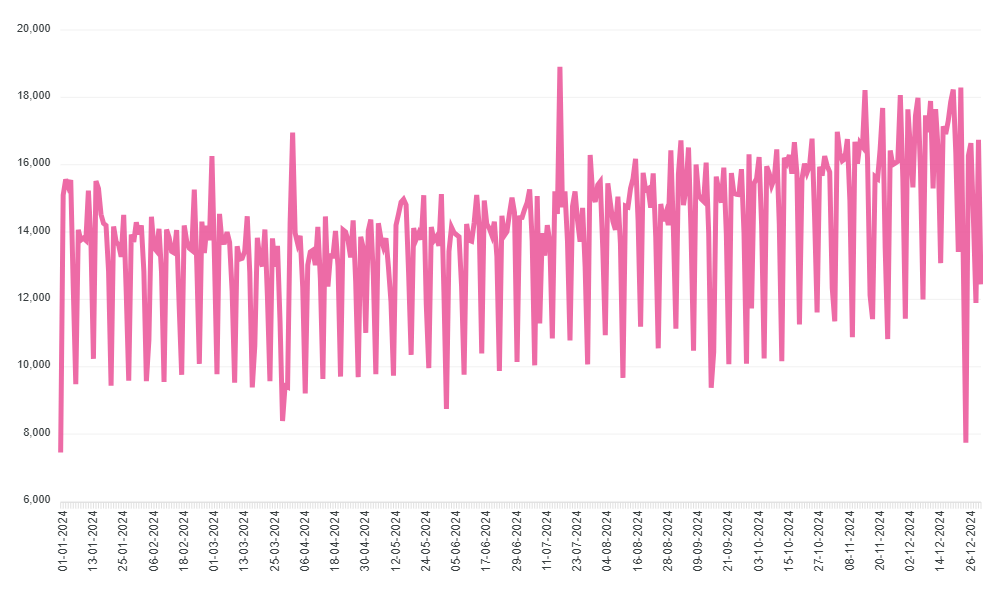
Daily ridership for Boulevard Puerto Aéreo station in 2024

According to official data, before the impact of the COVID-19 pandemic, the station recorded between 22,800 and 26,500 average daily entries from 2016 to 2019. In 2025, it recorded 5,919,006 passenger entries, ranking 81st among the system's 195 stations.

Annual passenger ridership
Year	Ridership	Average daily	Rank	% change	Ref.
2025	5,919,006	16,216	81/195	+16.10%	
2024	5,098,387	13,930	94/195	+546.76%	
2023	788,292	2,159	182/195	−62.09%	
2022	2,079,119	5,696	153/195	−61.98%	
2021	5,468,560	14,982	43/195	−0.87%	
2020	5,516,422	15,072	50/195	−34.56%	
2019	8,429,972	23,095	63/195	+0.94%	
2018	8,351,742	22,881	70/195	−7.33%	
2017	9,012,202	24,690	56/195	−6.74%	
2016	9,663,402	26,402	51/195	−10.44%	
