= Colonia Federal =

Neighborhood of Mexico City

Federal
- Neighborhood of Mexico City
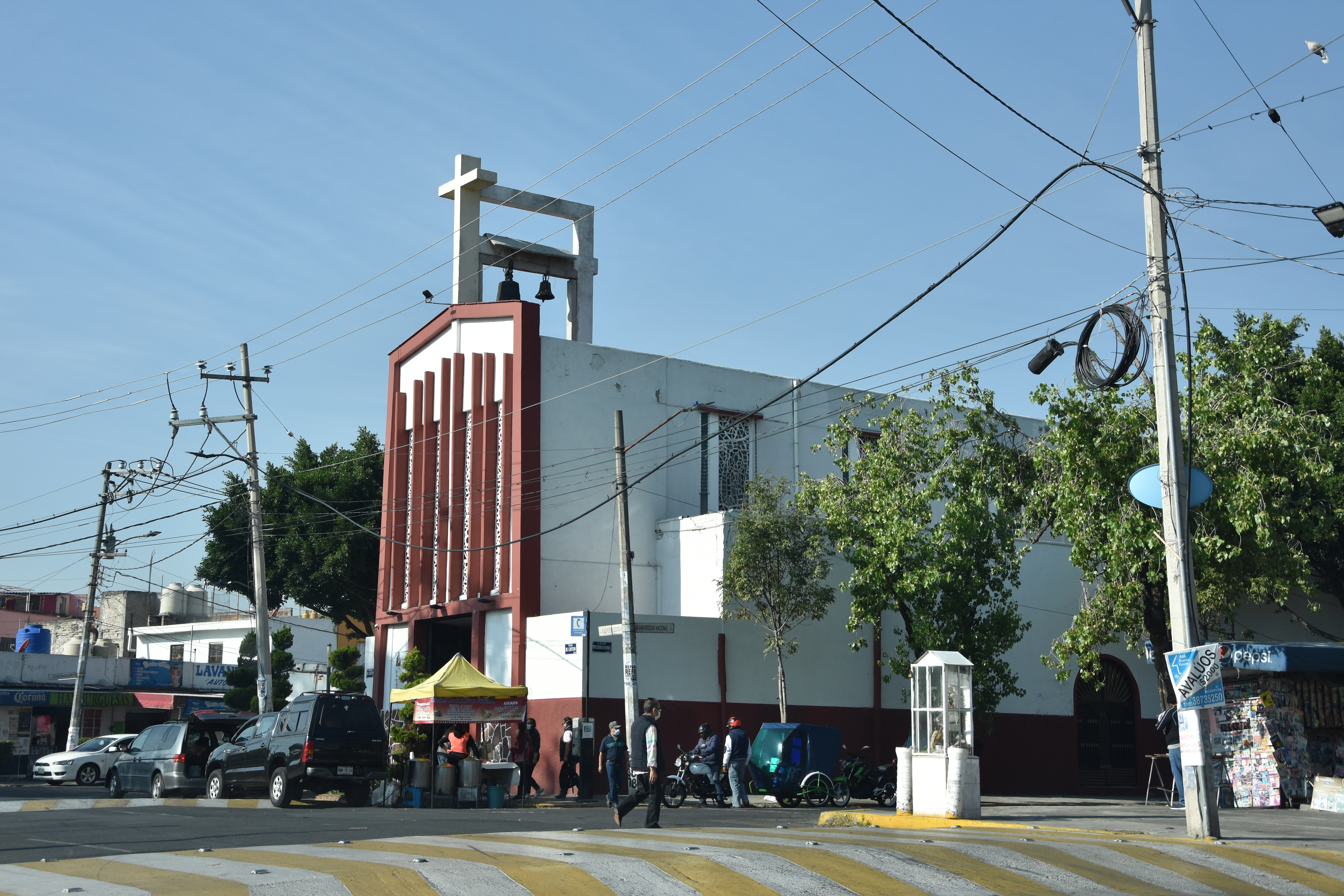
- Our Lady of the Sacred Heart Church in the center of the neighborhood
- Area map
- Location within Mexico City
- Coordinates: 19°25′12″N 99°5′17″W
- Country: Mexico
- City: Mexico City
- Borough: Venustiano Carranza

Population (2020)
  - Total: 10,551
- Postal code: 15700

Colonia Federal is a colonia in the Venustiano Carranza borough of Mexico City, just south of the Mexico City International Airport. The neighborhood is known for its particular shape that resembles a spider web.

== History and design ==
The neighborhood was built on the Llanos de Balbuena, land previously owned by the Braniff family, a bourgeois family living in the country (Alberto Braniff, the first aviator of Latin America, was a member of it). In 1908, the government of the country acquired 72 ha (180 acres) of land. The government considered creating a cemetery in the area, but since it was located far from the city center, the idea was discarded. After the end of the Mexican Revolution, around 1924, a prison was considered for construction. Instead, employees of the Secretariat of the Interior bought the land (then known as Cuatro Árboles) to build a neighborhood exclusively for civil servants. On 24 October 1924, president Álvaro Obregón authorized the sale but regretted that despite its size, the site was not large enough to accommodate all the employees. Construction began on 8 February 1925 and eight days later the neighborhood was officially founded.

The neighborhood was divided up for sale by Raúl Romero Erazo, grandfather of architect Fernando Romero. Street names reference the cabinet of Mexico and other government dependencies. These include names such as Hacienda (Secretariat of Finance and Public Credit), Contraloría (Secretariat of Civil Service), or Trabajo (Secretariat of Labor and Social Welfare). The radio-centric shape of the neighborhood, which resembles the design of a spider's web, is similar to that of Palmanova, a commune in Udine, Italy, or Place Charles de Gaulle, a road junction in Paris, France. By 1946, electricity was added to the area, drinking water pipes were installed in 1947, and by mid-century, the streets were paved.

== Points of interest ==
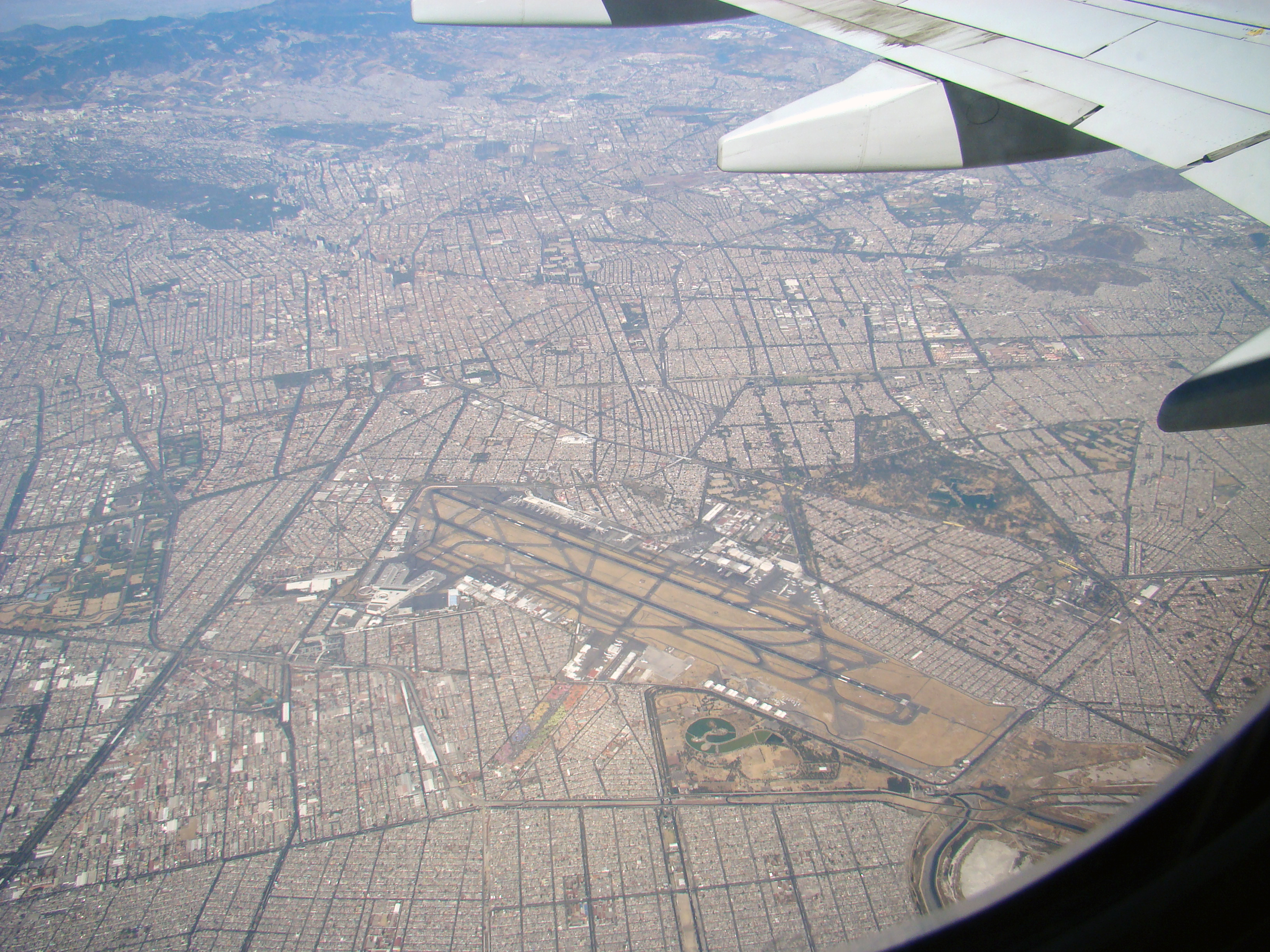
The neighborhood (center-left), next to the city's airport, as seen from an airplane.

In the middle, there is a roundabout (officially the Plaza del Poder Ejecutivo) with a culture center named Poliforum Cultural Colonia Federal. In front of it, there is the Our Lady of the Sacred Heart Church (Parroquia de Nuestra Señora del Sagrado Corazón), which was built in 1962.

== Transportation ==
Colonia Federal is serviced by the Hangares metro station to the north and the Gómez Farías metro station to the south.
