= Gómez Farías metro station =

Mexico City Metro station

Gómez Farías
- Station sign, 2026

General information
- Location: Calzada Ignacio Zaragoza; Venustiano Carranza, Mexico City; Mexico
- Coordinates: 19°24′59″N 99°05′25″W
- System: Mexico City Metro
- Owner: Government of Mexico City
- Operator: Sistema de Transporte Colectivo (STC)
- Platforms: 2 side platforms
- Tracks: 2
- Connections: Various local service routes

Construction
- Structure type: Underground
- Accessible: Partial

Other information
- Status: In service

History
- Opened: 5 September 1969; 57 years ago

Key dates
- 11 July 2022: Temporarily closed
- 29 October 2023: Reopened

Passengers
- 2025: 7,161,044 (Note: The system's website counts only passenger entries into stations and does not include passengers passing through, transferring between lines, or exiting the station. The data here is limited to the most recent ten years to avoid excessive listings; earlier figures can be found in this page's history or on the Mexico City Metro website. To calculate the average daily ridership, the annual total is divided by 365 days (366 in leap years), with decimals omitted from the result. Each station per line is ranked individually, as the system counts transfer stations separately. The percentage change is calculated automatically using the data from the current year and the previous year.) ▲28.84%
- Rank: 56/195

Services
Preceding station	Mexico City Metro	Following station
Boulevard Puerto Aéreo toward Observatorio	Line 1	Zaragoza toward Pantitlán
Route map
Location
- Location within Mexico City
- Area map and exits

Gómez Farías metro station (Note: Estación del Metro Gómez Farías. Mexican Spanish pronunciation: [ˈɡomes faˈɾi.as].) is a station of the Mexico City Metro in the city's borough of Venustiano Carranza. It is an underground stop with two side platforms serving Line 1 (Pink Line) between Boulevard Puerto Aéreo and Zaragoza. It was inaugurated on 4 September 1969, and opened the following day, providing service west toward Chapultepec and service east toward Zaragoza.

Gómez Farías metro station services the colonias (neighborhoods) of Federal and Gómez Farías along Calzada Ignacio Zaragoza. The station was named after the neighborhood of the same name, which itself honors Valentín Gómez Farías, the seventh president of Mexico (serving intermittently from 1833 to 1847). The station's pictogram depicts a representation of the 1857 Mexican Constitution, a document promoted by Gómez Farías during his tenure as president of Congress.

The station facilities offer accessibility for people with disabilities, featuring escalators and tactile paving. It was closed from July 2022 to October 2023 due to modernization works on the tunnel and the line's technical equipment. In 2025, Gómez Farías metro station had an average daily ridership of 7,161,044 passenger entries, ranking it the 56th busiest station in the network.

== Location and layout ==
Northern entrance in 2026

Gómez Farías is an underground metro station on Line 1 located along Calzada Ignacio Zaragoza, in the Colonias (neighborhoods), Federal and Gómez Farías, in the Venustiano Carranza borough, eastern Mexico City.

Gómez Farías station is located between Boulevard Puerto Aéreo and Zaragoza metro stations on the line. Gómez Farías metro station has two exits leading to Calzada Ignacio Zaragoza. The north exit is near Calle Relaciones Exteriores in Colonia Federal and the south one close to Calle 31 in Colonia Gómez Farías. The building offers accessible service for people with disabilities with escalators and tactile paving.

== History and construction ==
Northern lobby

Line 1 of the Mexico City Metro was built by Ingeniería de Sistemas de Transportes Metropolitano, Electrometro and Cometro, the last one a subsidiary of Empresas ICA. Its first section, where Gómez Farías metro station is located, was inaugurated on 4 September 1969, operating from Chapultepec to Zaragoza metro stations, and opened to the general public the following day. The tunnel between Gómez Farías and Zaragoza spans 762 meters (2,500 ft), while the section towards Boulevard Puerto Aéreo measures 611 meters (2,005 ft).

The station was closed on 11 July 2022 for modernization work on the tunnel and technical equipment of the line. After fifteen months of renovations, authorities reopened Gómez Farías station on 29 October 2023. Excélsior reported in July 2024 that all the modernized stations had leaks of varying dimensions, with water filtrations detected in the walls of Gómez Farías station, resulting in constant runoff into the drains. This issue left damp marks and affected the facilities. Authorities had previously stated that these leaks would be sealed during the 2022 modernization works.

=== Name and pictogram ===
The station is named after the nearby neighborhood. The station's pictogram depicts a silhouette representing the Mexican Constitution of 1857, which was promoted by Valentín Gómez Farías during his tenure as president of Congress.

=== Incidents ===
On 15 September 2026, a metallic object fell to the tracks, causing a short circuit. No injuries were reported.

== Ridership ==
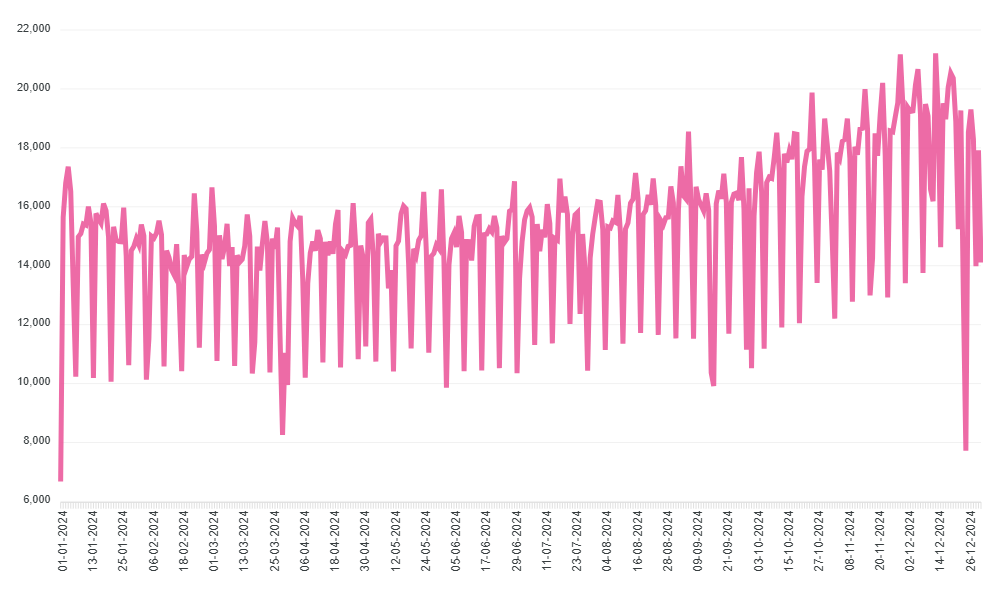
Daily ridership for Gómez Farías station in 2024

According to official data, before the impact of the COVID-19 pandemic, the station recorded between 28,300 and 38,800 average daily entries from 2016 to 2019. In 2025, it recorded 7,161,044 passenger entries, ranking 56th among the system's 195 stations.

Annual passenger ridership
Year	Ridership	Average daily	Rank	% change	Ref.
2025	7,161,044	19,619	56/195	+28.84%	
2024	5,557,948	15,185	82/195	+571.00%	
2023	828,313	2,269	180/195	−81.84%	
2022	4,560,126	12,493	94/195	−37.85%	
2021	7,337,725	20,103	22/195	−3.93%	
2020	7,637,970	20,868	24/195	−26.28%	
2019	10,360,851	28,385	48/195	−14.80%	
2018	12,161,295	33,318	32/195	+1.87%	
2017	11,938,118	32,707	33/195	−15.75%	
2016	14,170,037	38,715	23/195	−6.34%	
