= Shane Hryhorec =

Australian accessibility advocate

Shane Hryhorec (born c. 1985) is an Australian disability advocate, public speaker and entrepreneur from Adelaide, Australia.

== Early life ==
He grew up in South Australia participating in a wide range of sporting activities including swimming, football and triathlons. He was also a patrolling member of the Surf Life Saving Club while growing up on the coast.

== Injury and Advocacy ==
In 2007, at the age of 23, he sustained a spinal cord injury following an unfortunate incident at a swimming pool in his apartment block and was later diagnosed as a C5 incomplete quadriplegic. The injury became his driving force behind his advocacy relating to accessibility and disability-related initiatives.

He has advocated for nationwide infrastructure upgrades to make sure that all beaches are fully accessible, noting that only about 1% of Australian beaches currently offer disability access. He called for comprehensive solutions such as matting, wheelchairs and facilities. He has collaborated with local councils to implement practical and accessible pilot programs. He has also worked with local councils and community organisations such as Push Mobility, Accessible Beaches Australia and Wheel Around the World on issues relating to physical access to public spaces and inclusive infrastructure.

He has participated in public speaking where he called for air travel to be more accessible and educational programs addressing disability awareness and injury prevention, including initiatives such as Disability Leadership Institute.

== Career ==
Hryhorec founded Push Mobility, a mobility equipment business that develops adaptive equipment for people with disabilities, including modified paddleboards designed to support greater participation in water-based activities. In 2016, he became involved in the establishment of Accessible Beaches Australia, an initiative that advocates for improved access to beaches for wheelchair users and other people with mobility impairments.

He later launched Wheel Around the World, a travel project focused on accessible tourism. Through online video platforms, including YouTube and TikTok, the project documents the accessibility of transport, accommodation and tourist destinations, while highlighting both barriers and examples of inclusive design experienced during travel.

According to InDaily, Accessible Beaches Australia has supported accessibility improvements at more than 140 beaches across Australia, including the installation of beach matting, beach wheelchairs and accessible amenities.

Hryhorec is also associated with Co-able, an inclusive health and wellness co-working hub in Port Adelaide. The facility provides shared workspaces for disability-sector professionals and includes an accessible gym, wellness rooms and community spaces.

== Media coverage ==
Hryhorec has received media coverage for his advocacy on disability access and accessible transport. In October 2025, Australian media reported that he encountered accessibility barriers when visiting the electorate office of Federal Disability Minister Mark Butler, where the entrance included steps and the doorbell was not operational. Following the incident, he lodged a complaint with the Australian Human Rights Commission concerning accessibility at public buildings.

In 2022, Hryhorec spoke publicly about his experience while transiting through Abu Dhabi Airport after airport staff removed his passport and wheelchair during security procedures. In 2024, ABC News also reported his criticism of Virgin Australia after he said airline staff refused to gate-check his custom wheelchair. The airline later apologised for the incident.

== Awards and Recognition ==
Hryhorec has received several recognitions for his work in disability advocacy and accessible travel. In 2025 he was included in the "Beyond Barriers" list published by Condé Nast Traveller highlighting the various people working to improve accessibility in global travel.

He was also named a South Australian finalist for the Australian of the Year – Local Hero award and received the South Australian 40 Under 40 Game Changer Award.

In addition, he has received recognition through the Disability Leadership Institute National Awards for contributions to disability leadership and social impact.

== Personal life ==
Hryhorec was born in Adelaide, South Australia, and is based in Melbourne, Victoria. Following his spinal cord injury, he has spoken publicly about its impact on his daily life and has continued to travel in connection with his disability advocacy and accessibility initiatives. His travel project, Wheel Around the World, documents the accessibility of transport, accommodation and tourist destinations in different countries.

== See also ==
- Disability rights movement
- Accessible tourism
- Disability advocacy
