= Moctezuma metro station =

Mexico City metro station

Moctezuma
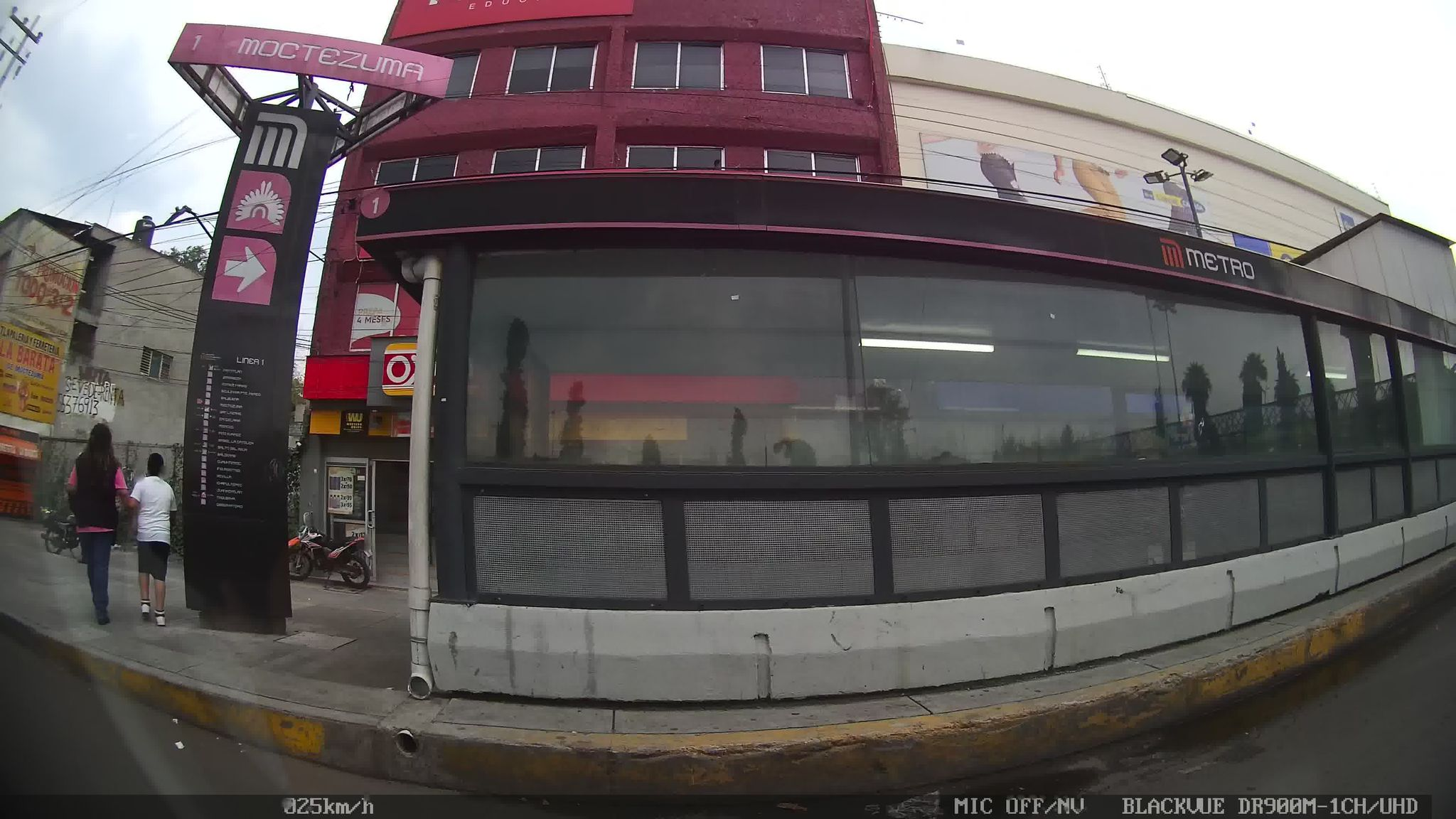
- Entrance and sign for Moctezuma, 2020

General information
- Location: Calzada Ignacio Zaragoza; Venustiano Carranza; Mexico City; Mexico
- Coordinates: 19.427218°N 99.110305°W
- System: Mexico City Metro
- Operator: Sistema de Transporte Colectivo (STC)
- Platforms: 2 side platforms
- Tracks: 2
- Connections: Moctezuma; Moctezuma

Construction
- Structure type: Underground

Other information
- Status: In service

History
- Opened: 4 September 1969; 56 years ago

Key dates
- 11 July 2022; 4 years ago: Temporarily closed
- 29 October 2023; 2 years ago: Reopened

Passengers
- 2025: 5,956,135 (Note: The data here is limited to the most recent ten years to avoid excessive listings; earlier figures can be found in this page's history or on the Mexico City Metro website. To calculate the average daily ridership, the annual total is divided by 365 days (366 in leap years), with decimals omitted from the result. Each station per line is ranked individually, as the system counts transfer stations separately. The percentage change is calculated automatically using the data from the current year and the previous year.) ▲21.87%
- Rank: 79/195

Services
Preceding station	Mexico City Metro	Following station
San Lázaro toward Observatorio	Line 1	Balbuena toward Pantitlán
Route map
Location
- Location within Mexico City
- Area map

Moctezuma is a station on Line 1 the Mexico City Metro. It is located in the Colonia Moctezuma and Colonia Balbuena neighborhoods of the Venustiano Carranza borough, to the northeast of the centre of Mexico City.

The station logo portrays a stylised drawing of the feathered headdress of Moctezuma II Xocoyotzin, the penultimate Aztec emperor, for whom the station is named. The station also boasts a display containing a reproduction of the feathered headdress, the original of which is currently held by the Museum of Ethnology in Vienna, Austria. The station was opened on 4 September 1969.

This station runs under Avenida Ignacio Zaragoza. Back when trolleybus line "F" was still running this metro station connected with it, and the trolleybus ran between Nueva Atzacoalco neighbourhood, north of the city, and Villa Coapa, south of the city. From July 2022 to October 2023, the station was closed due to modernization works on the tunnel and the line's technical equipment.

== Ridership ==
Annual passenger ridership
Year	Ridership	Average daily	Rank	% change	Ref.
2025	5,956,135	16,318	79/195	+21.87%
2024	4,887,368	13,353	98/195	+597.47%
2023	700,729	1,919	183/195	−77.40%
2022	3,100,000	8,493	127/195	−30.90%
2021	4,486,218	12,291	63/195	−5.85%
2020	4,764,721	13,018	63/195	−40.81%
2019	8,050,035	22,054	75/195	−5.41%
2018	8,510,790	23,317	64/195	+9.13%
2017	7,798,657	21,366	77/195	−8.76%
2016	8,547,315	23,353	70/195	−7.23%
