= Zaragoza metro station (Mexico City) =

Mexico City Metro station

Zaragoza
- Entrance, 2026

General information
- Location: Calzada Ignacio Zaragoza; Venustiano Carranza, Mexico City; Mexico
- Coordinates: 19°24′44″N 99°04′57″W
- System: Mexico City Metro
- Owner: Government of Mexico City
- Operator: Sistema de Transporte Colectivo (STC)
- Platforms: 2 side platforms
- Tracks: 2
- Connections: Zaragoza; Routes: 162B, 163, 163A, 163B, 164, 166, 167; Various local and intercity service routes

Construction
- Structure type: Underground
- Accessible: Yes

Other information
- Status: In service

History
- Opened: 5 September 1969; 57 years ago

Key dates
- 11 July 2022: Temporarily closed
- 29 October 2023: Reopened

Passengers
- 2025: 8,295,365 (Note: The system's website counts only passenger entries into stations and does not include passengers passing through, transferring between lines, or exiting the station. The data here is limited to the most recent ten years to avoid excessive listings; earlier figures can be found in this page's history or on the Mexico City Metro website. To calculate the average daily ridership, the annual total is divided by 365 days (366 in leap years), with decimals omitted from the result. Each station per line is ranked individually, as the system counts transfer stations separately. The percentage change is calculated automatically using the data from the current year and the previous year.) ▲15.4%
- Rank: 44/195

Services
Preceding station	Mexico City Metro	Following station
Gómez Farías toward Observatorio	Line 1	Pantitlán Terminus
Route map
Location
- Location within Mexico City
- Area map and exits

Zaragoza metro station (Note: Estación del Metro Zaragoza. Mexican Spanish pronunciation: [saɾaˈɣosa].) is a station of the Mexico City Metro in the city's borough of Venustiano Carranza. It is an underground stop with two side platforms serving Line 1 (Pink Line) between Gómez Farías and Pantitlán. It was inaugurated on 4 September 1969, and opened the following day, as the eastern terminal of the line, providing service west toward Chapultepec station. An eastward expansion toward Pantitlán started on 22 August 1984.

Zaragoza metro station services the colonias (neighborhoods) of 4 Árboles and Puebla along Calzada Ignacio Zaragoza, from which it takes its name. In turn, the avenue honors Ignacio Zaragoza, the Secretary of War and Navy during the 1862 Battle of Puebla (internationally known as Cinco de Mayo). The station's pictogram depicts a silhouette of a nearby equestrian statue dedicated to Zaragoza.

The station facilities offer accessibility for people with disabilities, featuring elevators, tactile paving, wheelchair ramps, and braille signage plates. Zaragoza includes a cultural display, an Internet café, and a health module. Outside, the station is serviced by a transportation hub connecting multiple local bus routes. It was closed from 2022 to 2023 due to modernization works on the tunnel and the line's technical equipment. In 2025, Zaragoza metro station had an average daily ridership of 22,727 passenger entries, ranking it the 44th busiest station in the network.

== Location and layout ==
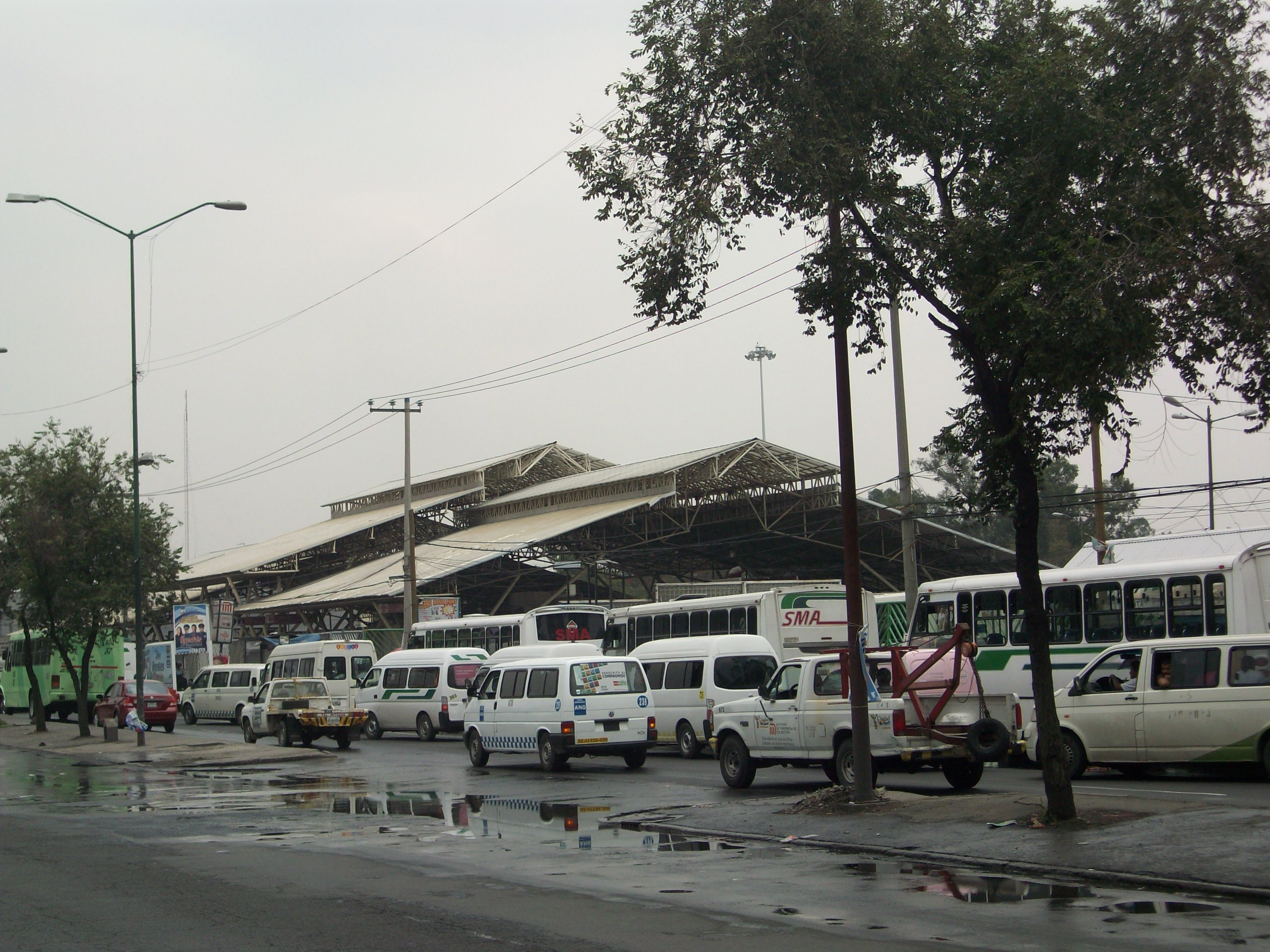
The station's entrance building is adjacent to Calzada Ignacio Zaragoza and the respective CETRAM (pictured).

Zaragoza is an underground metro station on Line 1 located along Calzada Ignacio Zaragoza, in the Colonias (neighborhoods) of 4 Árboles and Puebla, in the Venustiano Carranza borough, eastern Mexico City.

Within the system, the station lies between Gómez Farías and Pantitlán stations. Inside the station, there is a cultural display, an Internet café, and a health module. The area receives service from the adjacent Centro de transferencia modal (CETRAM), the stop's transportation hub, which connects to various transit routes, including Routes 162B, 163, 163A, 163B, 164, 166, and 167 of the Red de Transporte de Pasajeros bus network.

Zaragoza metro station has two exits that connect to Calzada Ignacio Zaragoza. The northern exit is located in a building adjacent to the transportation hub in Colonia 4 Árboles, while the southern exit is near Calle 65 in Colonia Puebla. The station offers an accessible service for people with disabilities with elevators, wheelchair ramps, tactile paving, and braille signage plates.

=== Landmarks ===
The Instituto de Capacitacion y Desarrollo Zaragoza, located near the station, trains system personnel using full-scale replicas and models of the facilities and equipment. Known as Expometro, it is open to the general public for guided tours.

== History and construction ==
Line 1 of the Mexico City Metro was built by Ingeniería de Sistemas de Transportes Metropolitano, Electrometro, and Cometro, the latter being a subsidiary of Empresas ICA. Its first section, where Zaragoza metro station is located, was inaugurated on 4 September 1969, operating from Zaragoza to Chapultepec station, and opened to the general public the following day. The line's workshops are found in the tunnel following Zaragoza.

On 22 August 1984, Pantitlán station was opened eastward to connect Lines 1 and 5. The workshop's location indirectly benefited the line's operations as it allowed trains to depart to either station every 90 seconds. The tunnel between Zaragoza and Gómez Farías spans 762 meters (2,500 ft), while the section towards Pantitlán measures 1,320 meters (4,330 ft).

The station was closed on 11 July 2022 for modernization work on the tunnel and technical equipment of the line. After fifteen months of renovations, authorities reopened Zaragoza station on 29 October 2023. Excélsior reported in July 2024 that all the modernized stations had leaks of varying dimensions, including water filtration on the train boarding platforms at Zaragoza station. Authorities had previously stated that these leaks would be sealed during the 2022 modernization works.

=== Name and pictogram ===
Zaragoza metro station was named after Ignacio Zaragoza, who was the Secretary of War and Navy during the 1862 Battle of Puebla, which is celebrated on Cinco de Mayo. The station's pictogram depicts a silhouette of an equestrian statue of Zaragoza located in the zone.

=== Incidents ===
On 21 October 2026, a metal cane fell onto the tracks, causing a short circuit that burned to two people and injured a third person in a fall.

== Ridership ==
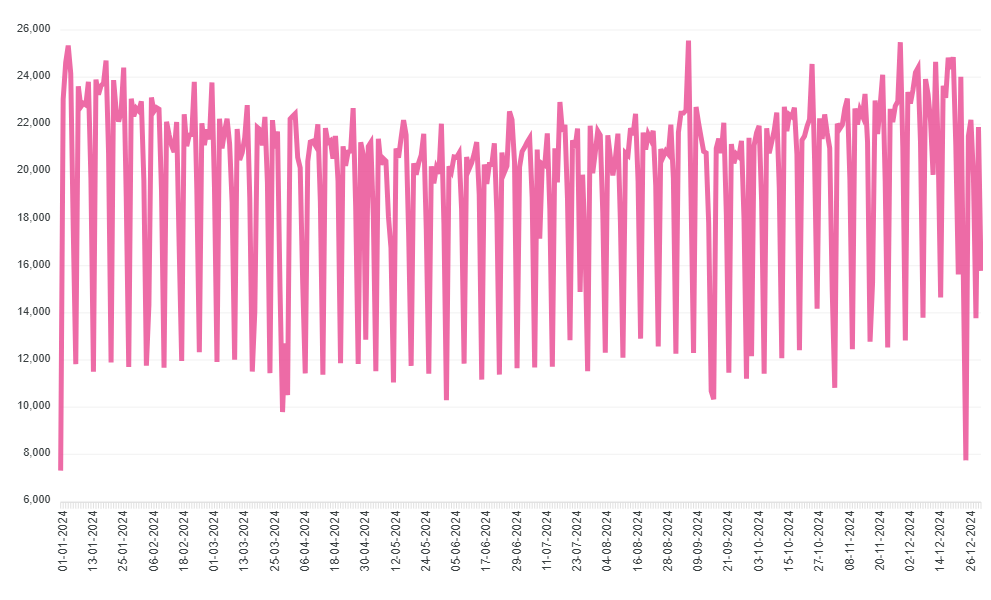
Daily ridership for Zaragoza station in 2024

According to official data, before the impact of the COVID-19 pandemic, the station recorded between 46,400 and 52,200 average daily entries from 2016 to 2019. In 2025, it recorded 8,295,365 passenger entries, ranking 44thamong the system's 195 stations.

Annual passenger ridership
Year	Ridership	Average daily	Rank	% change	Ref.
2025	8,295,365	22,727	44/195	+15.40%	
2024	7,188,568	19,640	50/195	+554.27%	
2023	1,098,718	3,010	176/195	−81.75%	
2022	6,018,927	16,490	64/195	−30.89%	
2021	8,708,578	23,859	19/195	−12.98%	
2020	10,007,100	27,341	17/195	−41.01%	
2019	16,963,437	46,475	18/195	−6.63%	
2018	18,168,605	49,777	16/195	−2.61%	
2017	18,655,391	51,110	15/195	−2.29%	
2016	19,093,141	52,167	16/195	−7.18%	

== Gallery ==
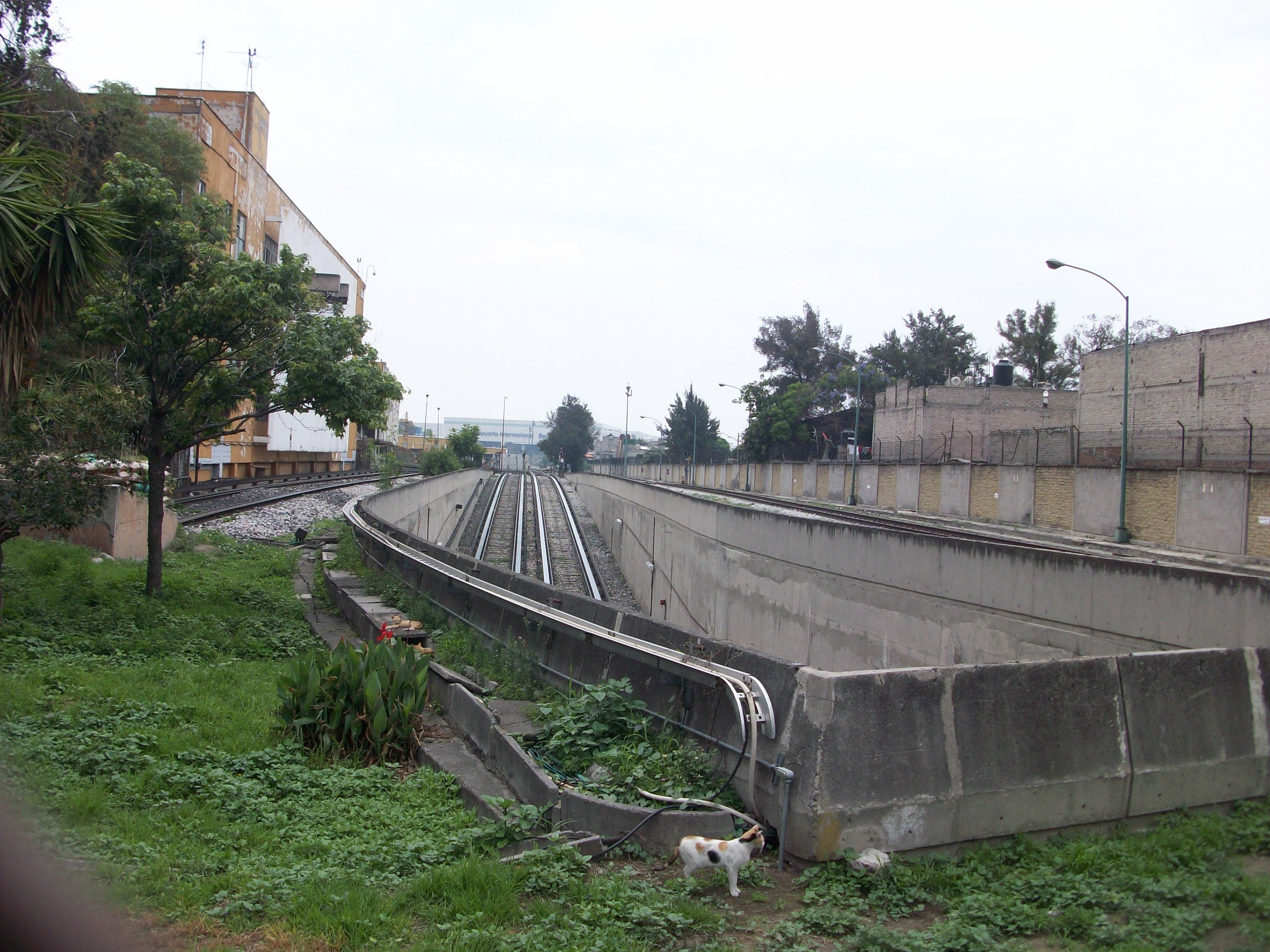
Line 1 exit to the Zaragoza workshops.

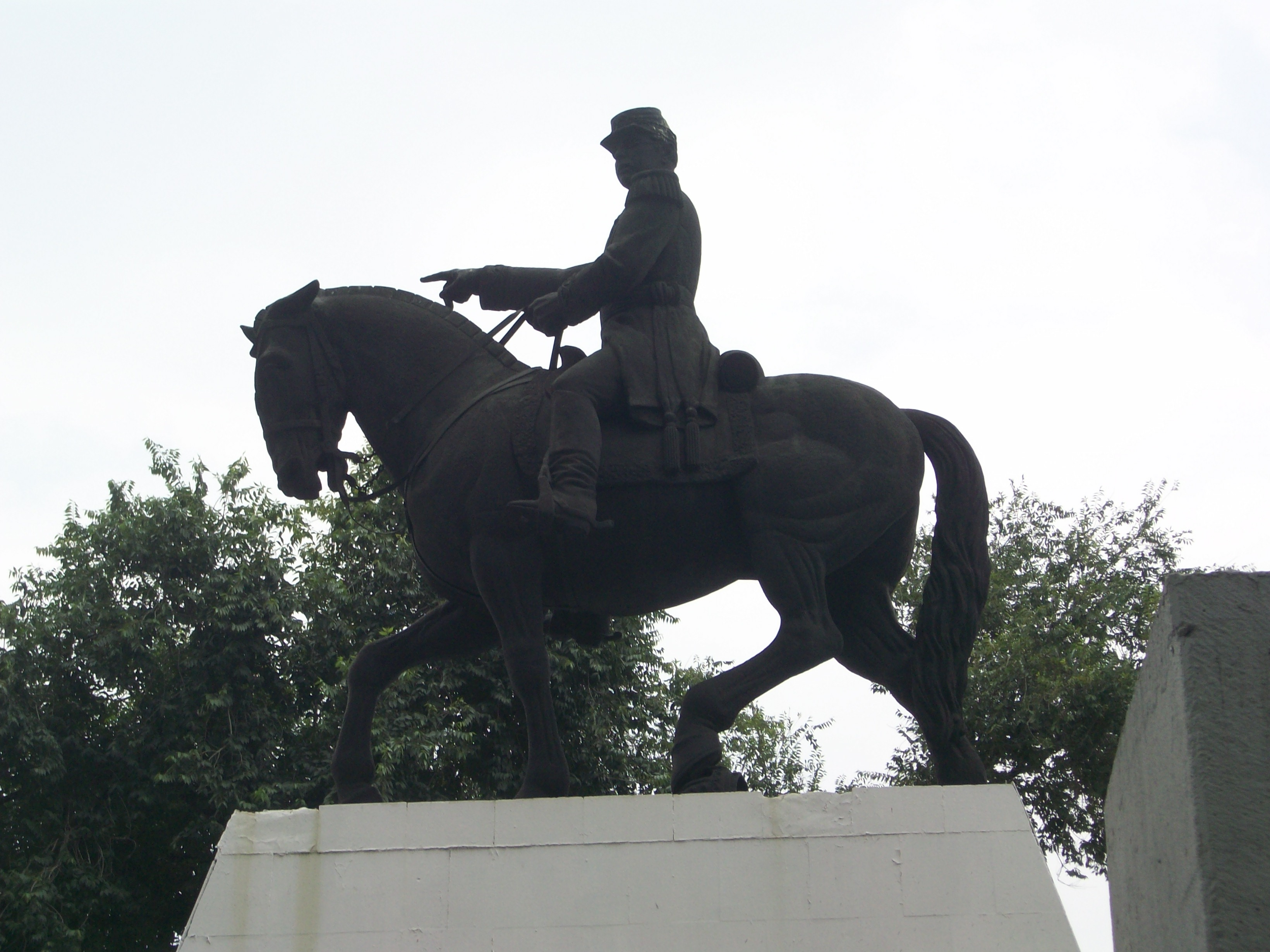
The equestrian statue of Zaragoza near the station inspired the design of the station's pictogram.
