= Accessible tourism =

Accessibility of tourism for disabled people

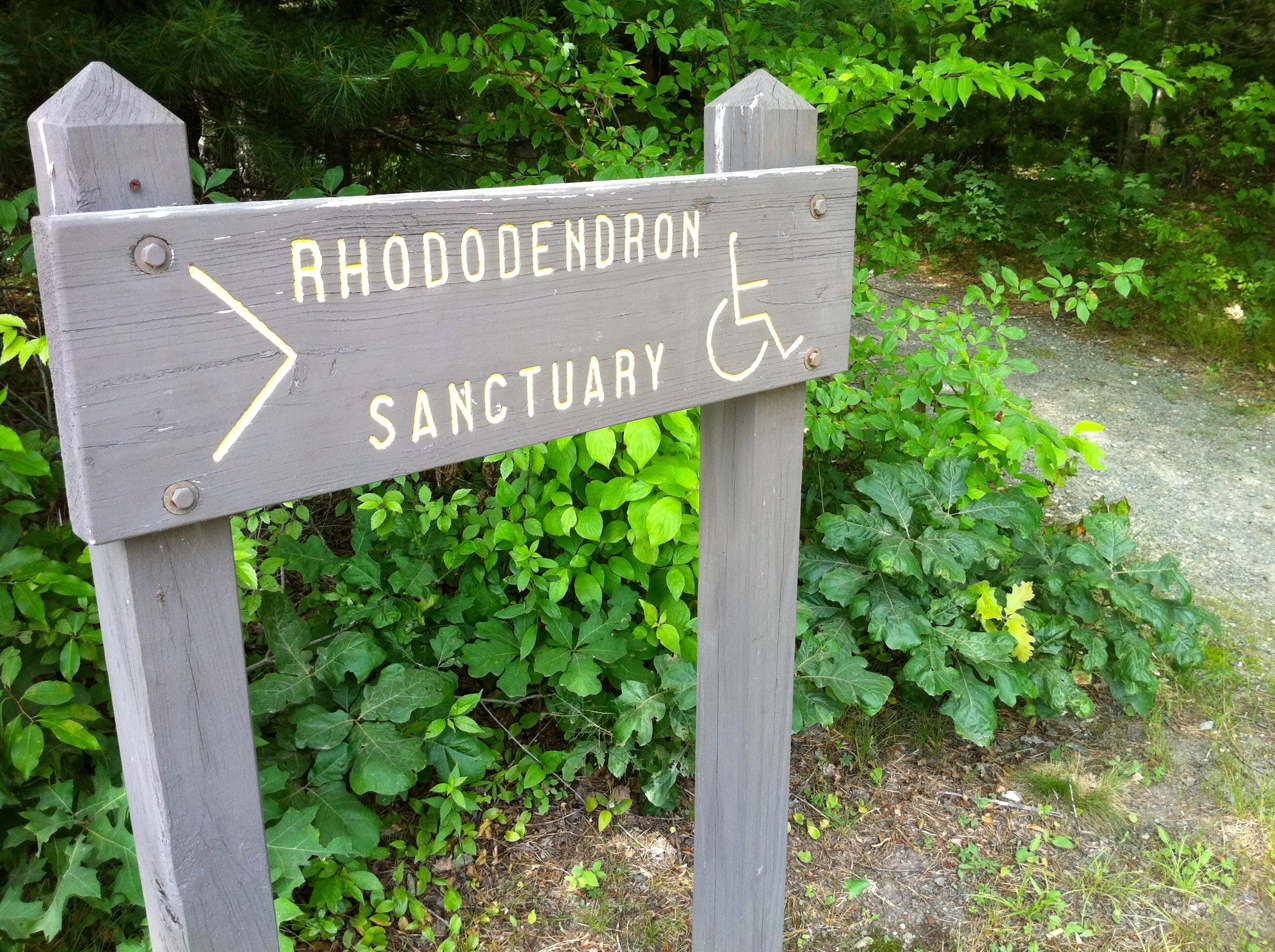
Nehantic Trail - Rhododendron Sanctuary Trail entrance and Wheelchair-accessible sign

Accessible tourism is the ongoing endeavor to ensure tourist destinations, products, and services are accessible to all people, regardless of their physical or intellectual limitations, disabilities or age. It encompasses publicly and privately owned and operated tourist locations. The goal of accessible tourism is to create inclusivity of all including those traveling with children, people with disabilities, as well as seniors. This allows those with access requirements to be able to function as an independent using products following the universal design principle, a variety of services, and different environments.

== Background ==
=== Overview ===
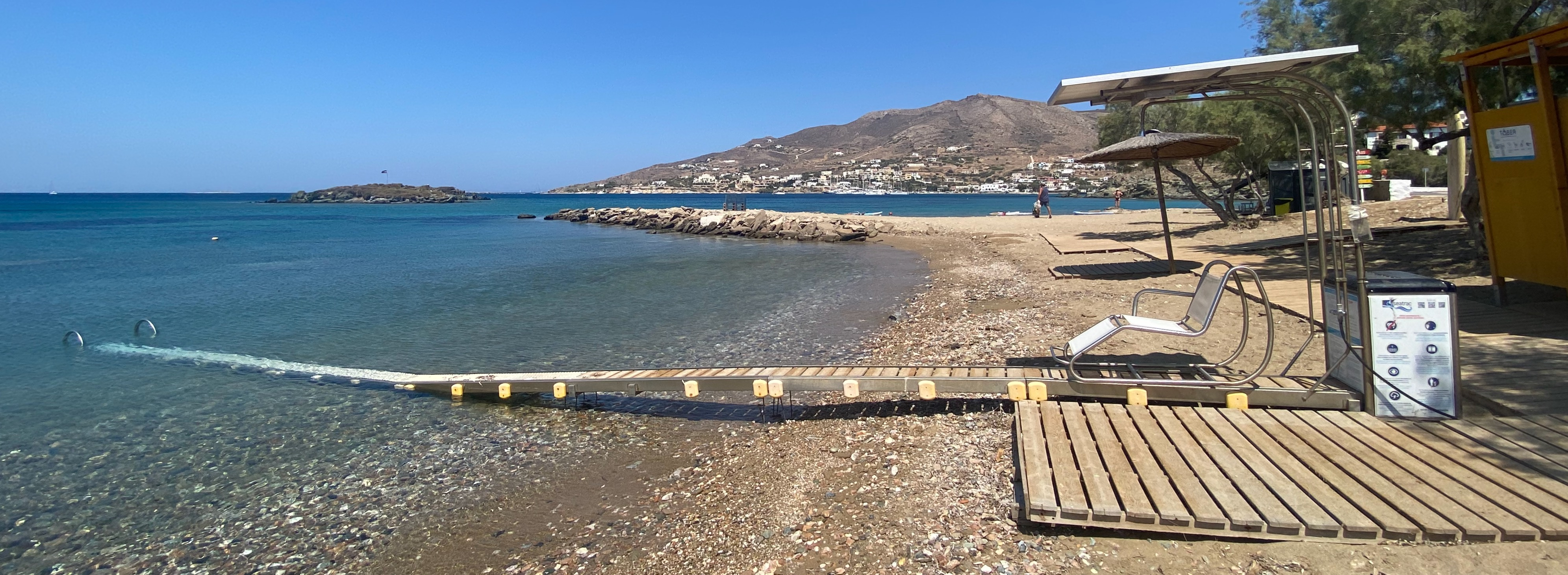
This motorised water access chair on the Greek island of Syros offers a way for wheelchair users to enter and exit the water

Accessible tourism is defined as a way of making tourist locations more accessible to all populations. It does not just encompass those with disability, but it includes people of all populations including those with children and the elderly. The tourism industry is continuously evolving which has led to a need for accessibility. Because of this, it has also led to an increased market for accessible tourism. With the rise of the independent living movement, seen in places such as Berkeley, California, it has also raised questions about the definition of the landscape and the people within it. The rise of this movement in turn created a demand from the population to modify the city to allow for greater and equal access for everyone.

Modern society is increasingly aware of the concept of integration of people with disabilities. Issues such as accessibility and universal design are featured in the international symposia of bodies such as the European Commission. Steps have been taken to promote guidelines and best practices, and major resources are now dedicated to this field.

A greater understanding of the accessible tourism market has been promoted through research commissioned by the European Commission where a stakeholder analysis has provided an insight into the complexities of accessible tourism. Similarly, the Australian Sustainable Tourism Cooperative Research Centre funded an Accessible Tourism Research Agenda that sought to outline a research base on which to develop the supply, demand and coordination/regulation information required to develop the market segment. The research agenda has now seen three other funded projects contribute towards a research base on which the tourism industry and government marketing authorities can make more informed decisions.

As of 2020, approximately 15% of the world's population lives with some form of disability, with one-fifth of the total, or between 110 million and 190 million people, living with a disability that affects daily life. Based on a report in 2011 by World Health Organization and the World Bank, over 1 billion of people in the world had some disability, with 200 million of those who have experienced severe difficulty in functioning.

In addition to the social and health benefits, the market represents an opportunity for new investment and new service requirements, rarely provided by key players in the tourism sector.

According to ENAT, the European Network for Accessible Tourism, accessible tourism includes but is not limited to:

- Barrier-free destinations: infrastructure and facilities
- Transport: by air, land and sea, suitable for all users
- High quality services: delivered by trained staff
- Activities, exhibits, attractions: allowing participation in tourism by everyone
- Marketing, booking systems, web sites & services: information accessible to all

=== Brief history and trends ===
The shift from the medical model to the social model of disability had a major contribution in the development of the concept of accessible tourism. With the Disability Rights Movement in full swing in the mid to late-1900s, the traditional view of disability that focuses on the individuals' impairments and the medical interventions to fix those impairments was significantly challenged. The newly emerged social model of disability postulates that disability is not constructed solely by a medical condition a person has but rather by the social environments that impose various kinds of barriers on people with impairments. With the influence of the social model, the general understanding of disability has been expanded to place greater emphasis on removing the socially imposed barriers and achieving greater accessibility for individuals with disability and various access needs. This endeavor to create a more inclusive environment for all people led to the emergence of the concept of Universal Design, which is the design of products and environments that can be easily accessed, understood, and used by anyone, regardless of one's ability. In 1997, the 7 principles of universal design were developed. These principles include:

- Equitable Use
- Flexibility in Use
- Simple and Intuitive Use
- Perceptible Information
- Tolerance for Error
- Low Psychical Effort
- Size and Space for Approach and Use

The principles of universal design provided important conceptual foundation and guidelines for the tourism industry on how to design tourism products and services that have the value of inclusivity at their center.

Today, Europe and the United States of America are home to the majority of the existing companies in the accessible tourism industry. However, companies worldwide are starting to appear as the result of a growing need, largely driven by senior tourism, due to increasing life expectancy in developed countries. The United States requires ADA compliant ramp access to virtually all businesses and public places. Portugal, Spain, the United Kingdom, Germany, France and other northern European countries are increasingly prepared to receive tourists in wheelchairs, and to provide disability equipment and wheelchair accessible transport.

With the growth of the internet, online travel planning is also becoming more common, leading to the rise of online accessibility maps. For example, starting in 2016, Lonely Planet started offering online accessibility resources by country. As for the future of accessibility tourism, b predicts that, "emerging field of study will influence tourism destination competitiveness in the future, whether that be from a human rights, emerging market segment or service delivery perspective" (Michopoulou, Darcy, Ambrose, & Buhalis, 2015).

== Regulations ==
Many individual countries have legislation designed to support the needs of people with disabilities, but the closest thing to an international standard for accessible tourism would be Article 9 of the United Nations Convention on the Rights of Persons with Disabilities (CRPD). Since its adoption on December 13, 2006, the CRPD has gained 164 signatories and was the fastest human rights treaty to be enacted. The convention was designed to combat many of the challenges that people with disabilities face through legal protections of rights and freedoms, increased access to services that facilitate independent living, decreased discrimination and stigmatization, and raised awareness of disability-related issues. Article 9 focuses specifically on accessibility and what is required to provide people with disabilities with equal access and opportunities to participate in every aspect of society. Not only do these accommodations benefit the disabled citizens of the countries that are a part of the CRPD, but they also improve the experiences of disabled travelers and tourists.

== Specific accommodations ==
Although this is not an exhaustive list of possible accommodations related to accessible tourism, the examples below demonstrate some solutions to common problems that people with disabilities experience while traveling.

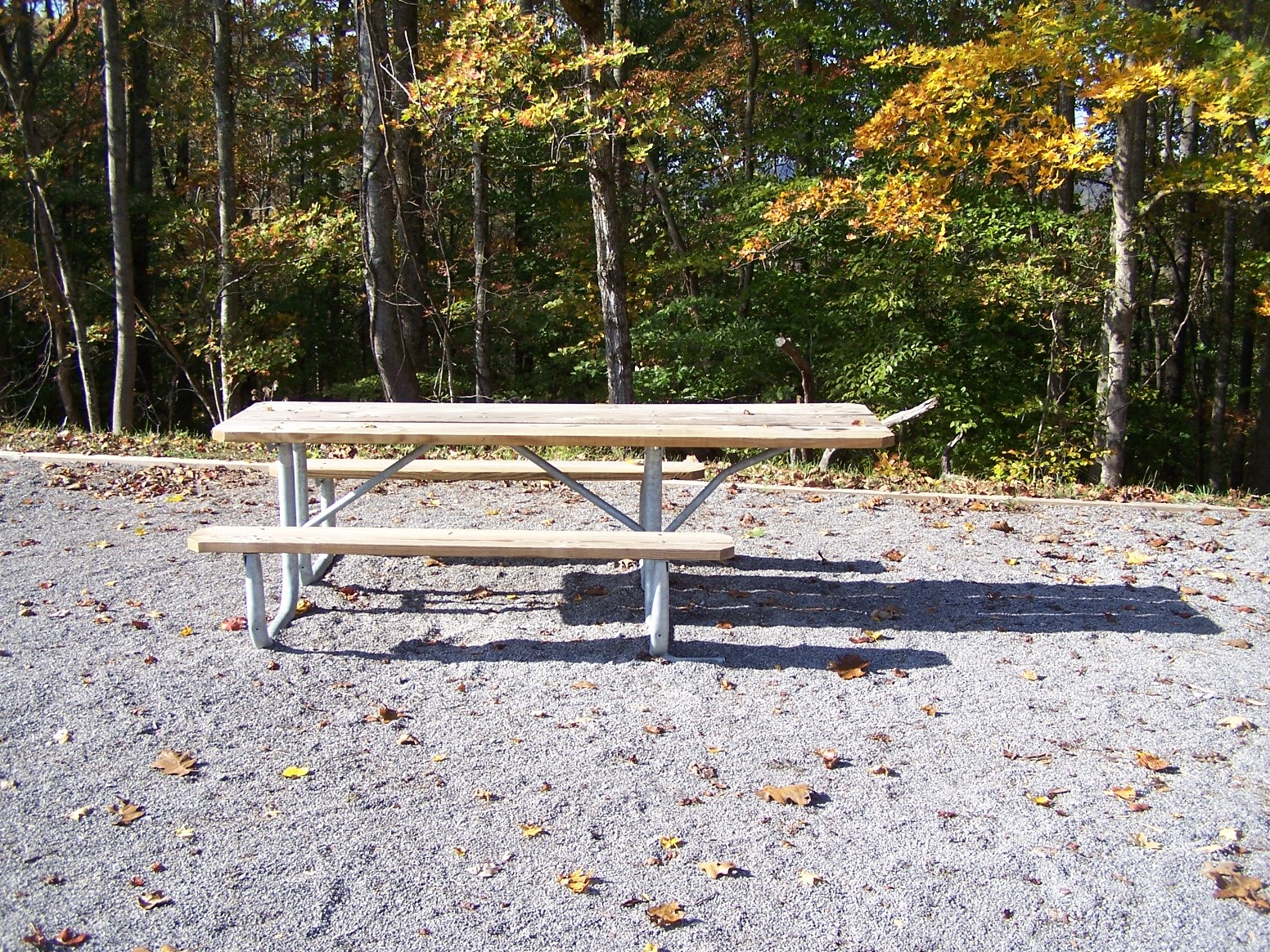
A campground picnic table made accessible to wheelchairs and walkers with its extended top.

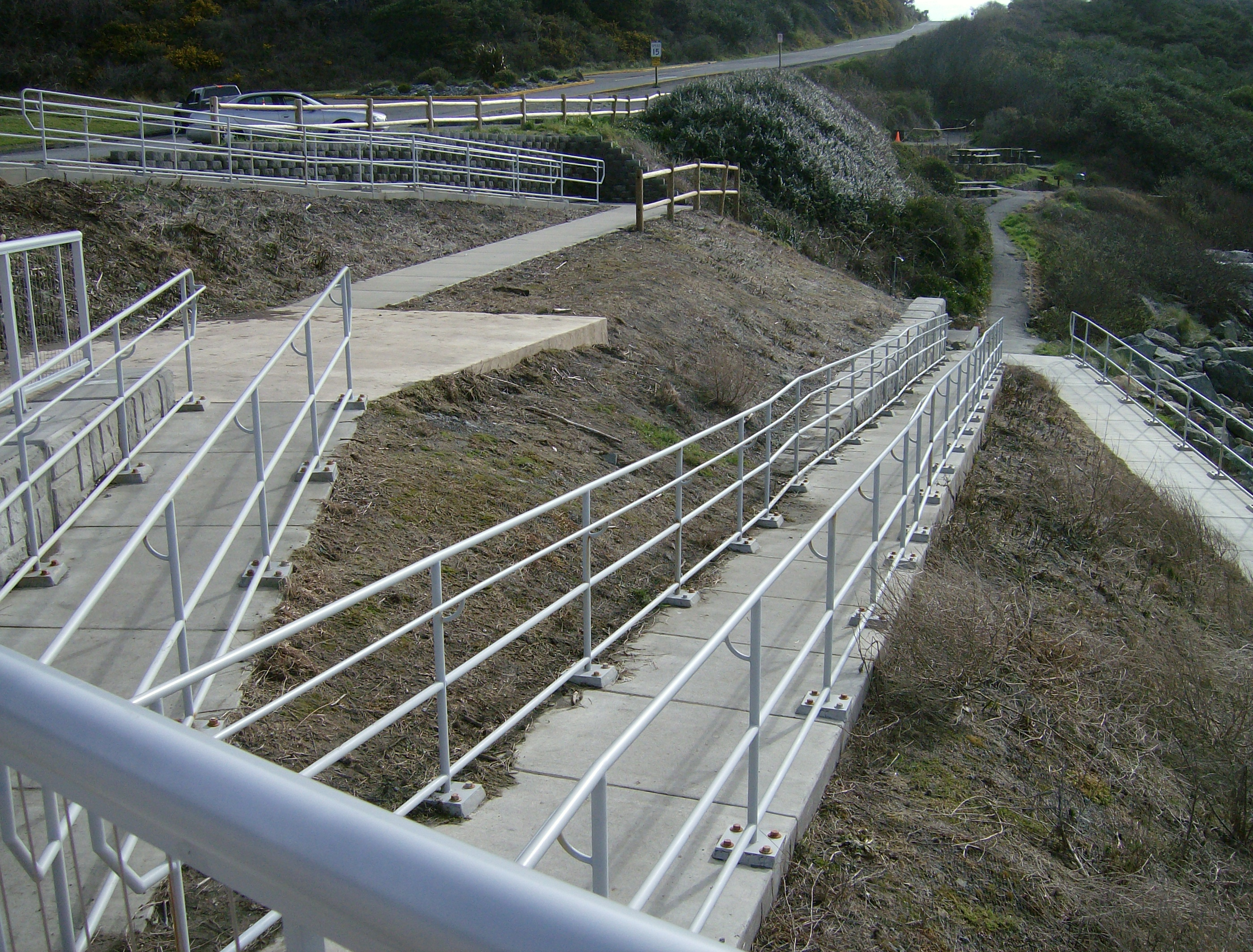
An accessible "boardwalk" ramp with landings for stopping to enjoy a panorama view. Harris Beach State Park, Brookings, Oregon.

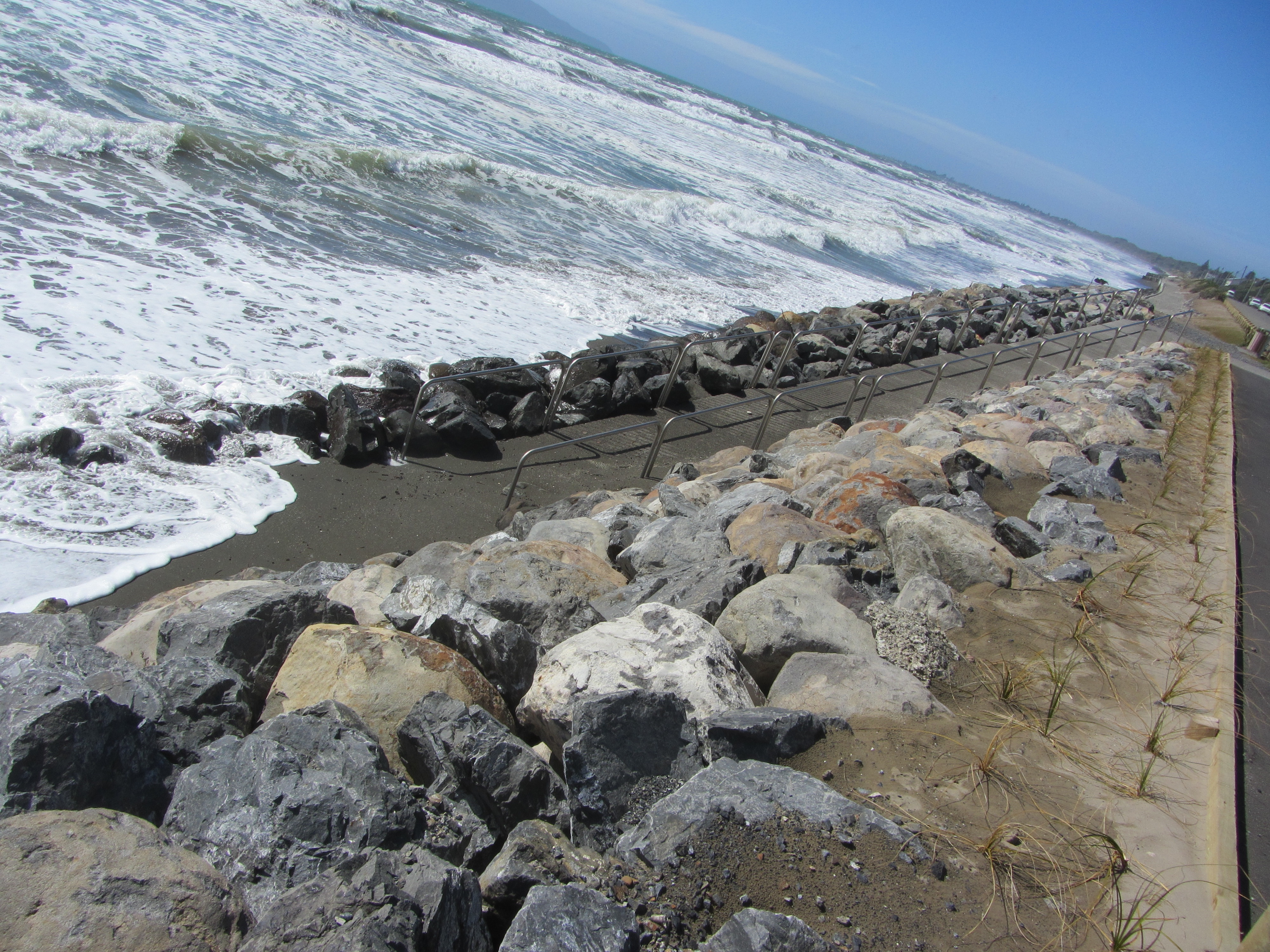
Kapiti Island coast accessible beach, wheelchair ramp, Paekakariki, Wellington, New Zealand.

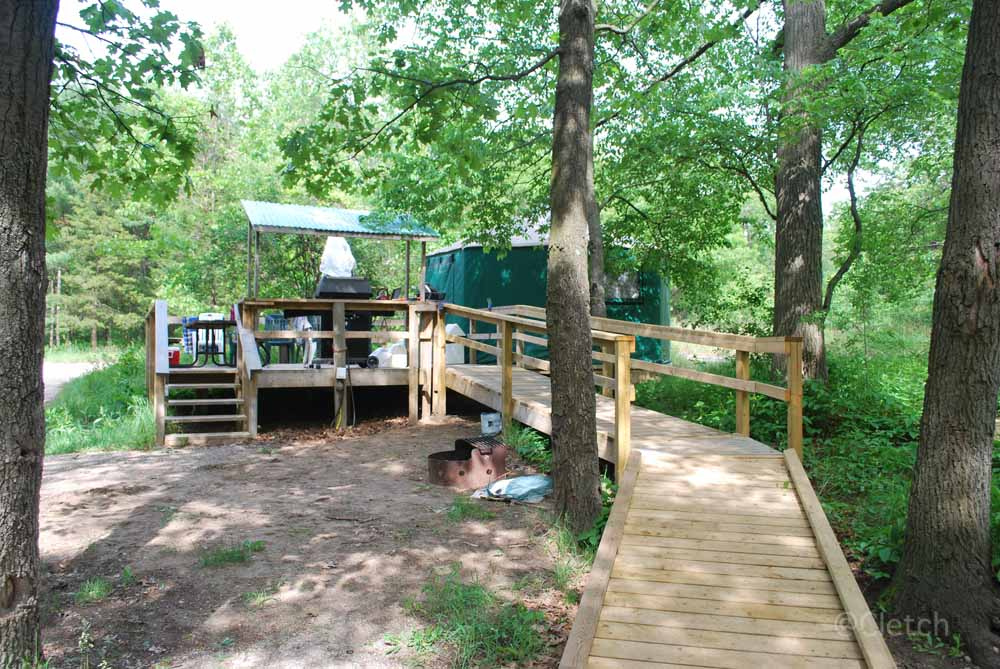
An accessible yurt shelter in Pinery Provincial Park, Ontario, Canada.

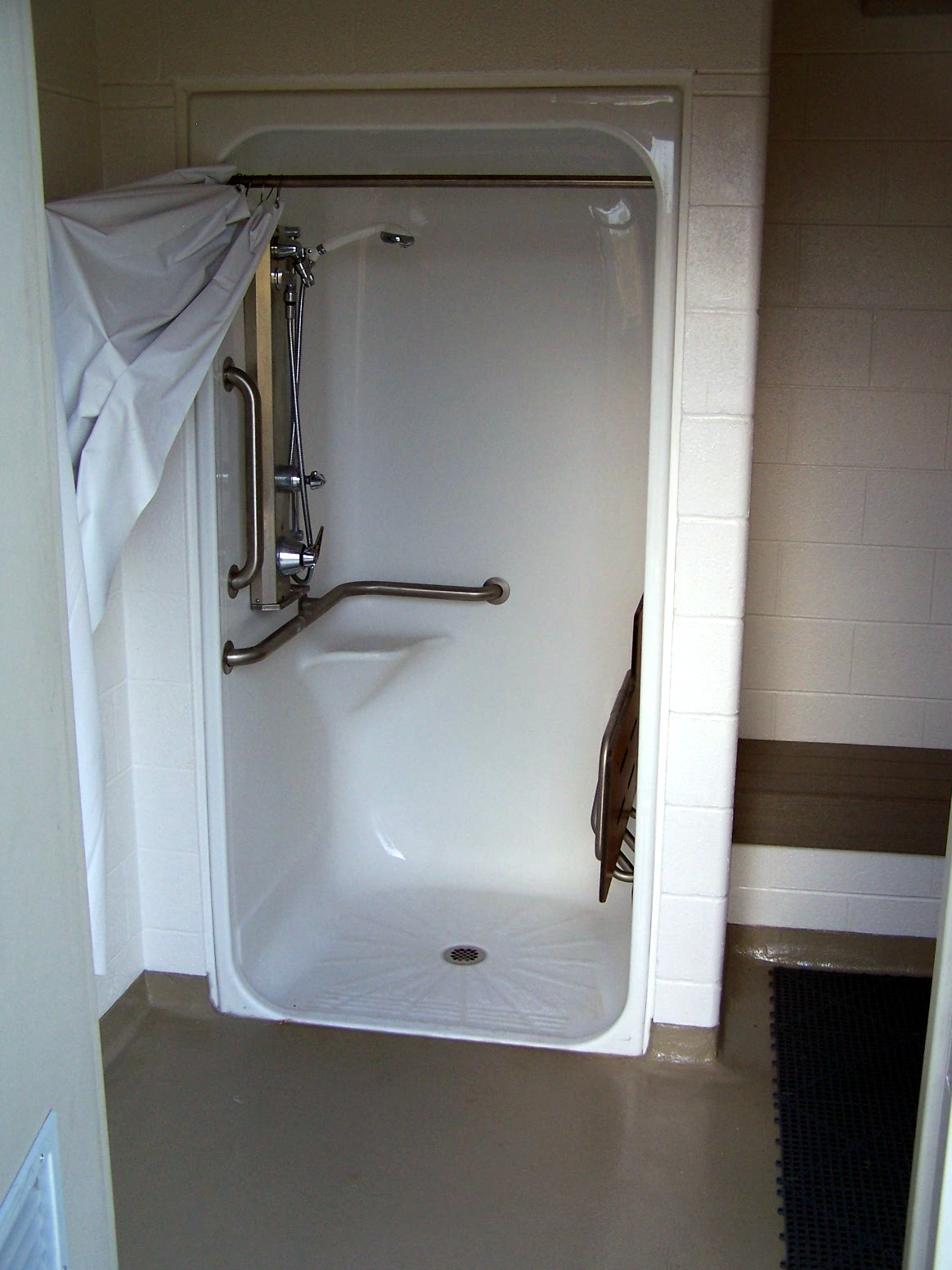
An accessible shower stall at a State park in Virginia.

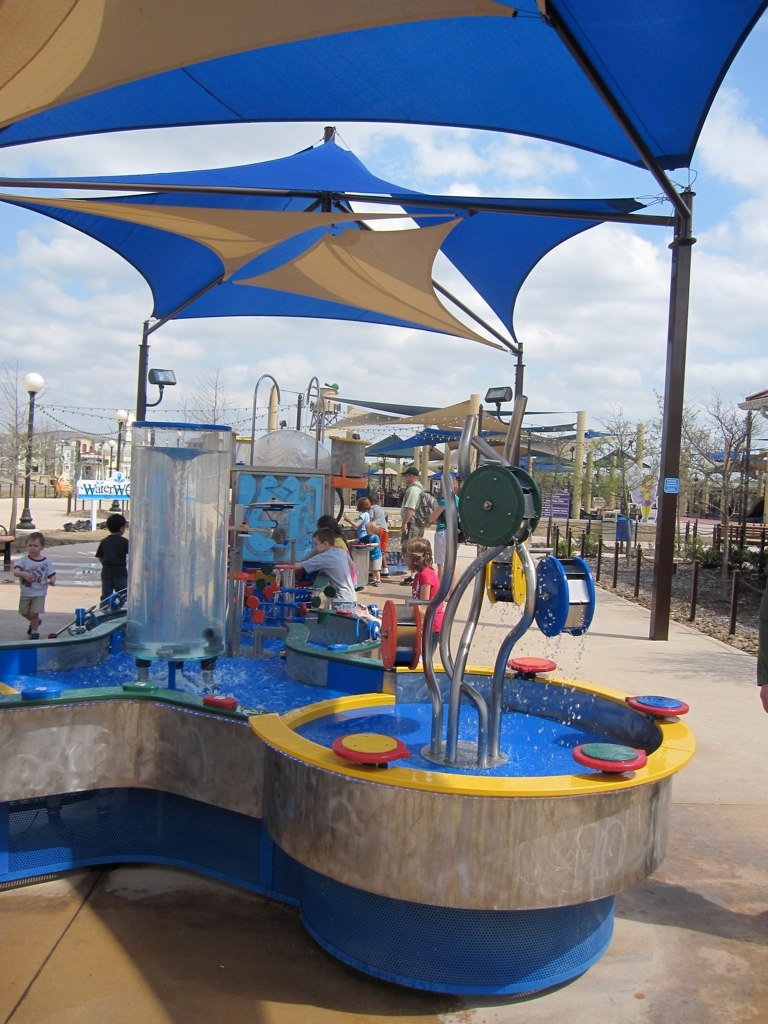
Morgan's Wonderland is an accessible family amusement park in San Antonio, Texas, designed similar to a sensory garden with interactive games.

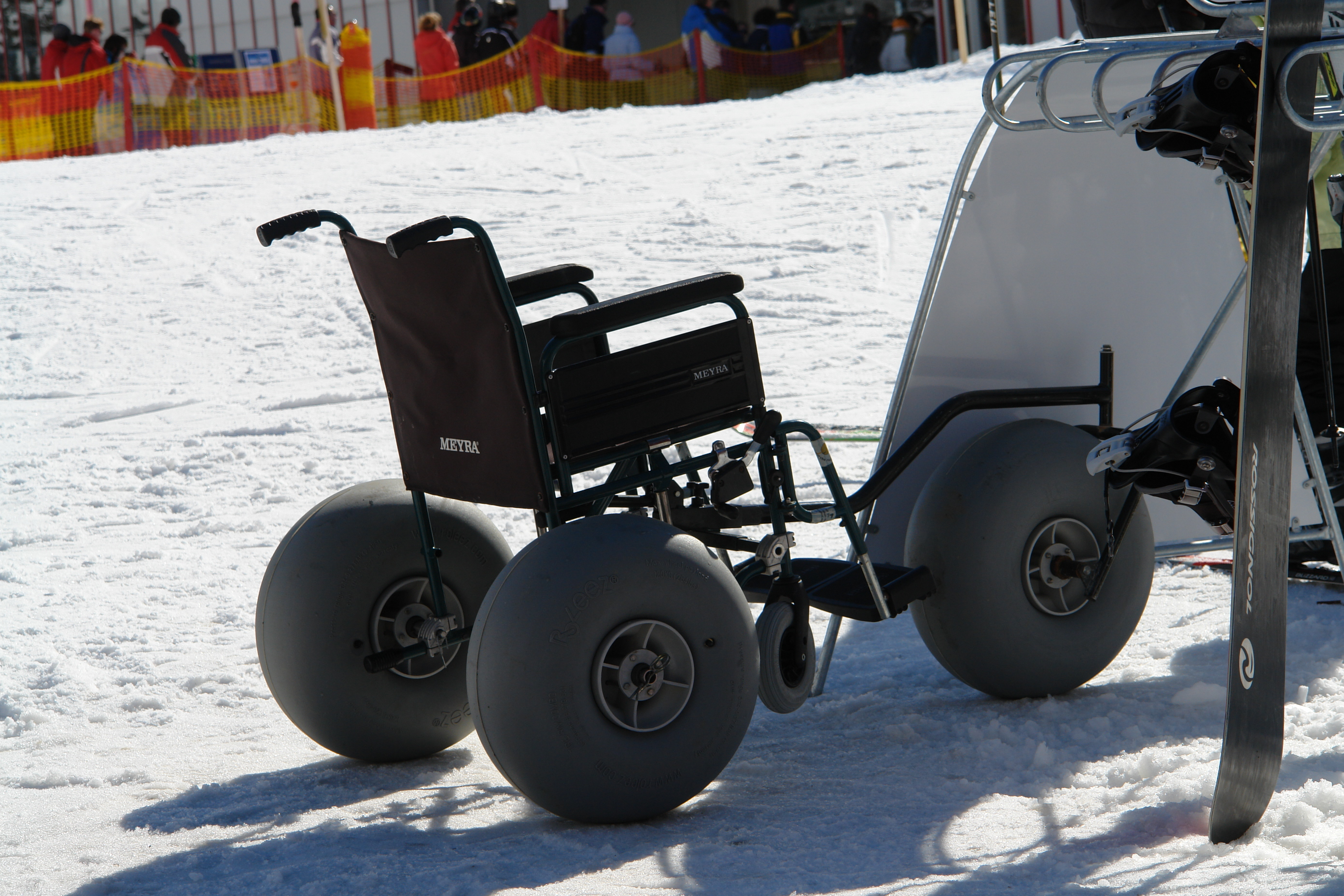
A wheelchair with adaptive tires for travelling across snow at a ski hill. Such chairs can be loaned or rented to users.

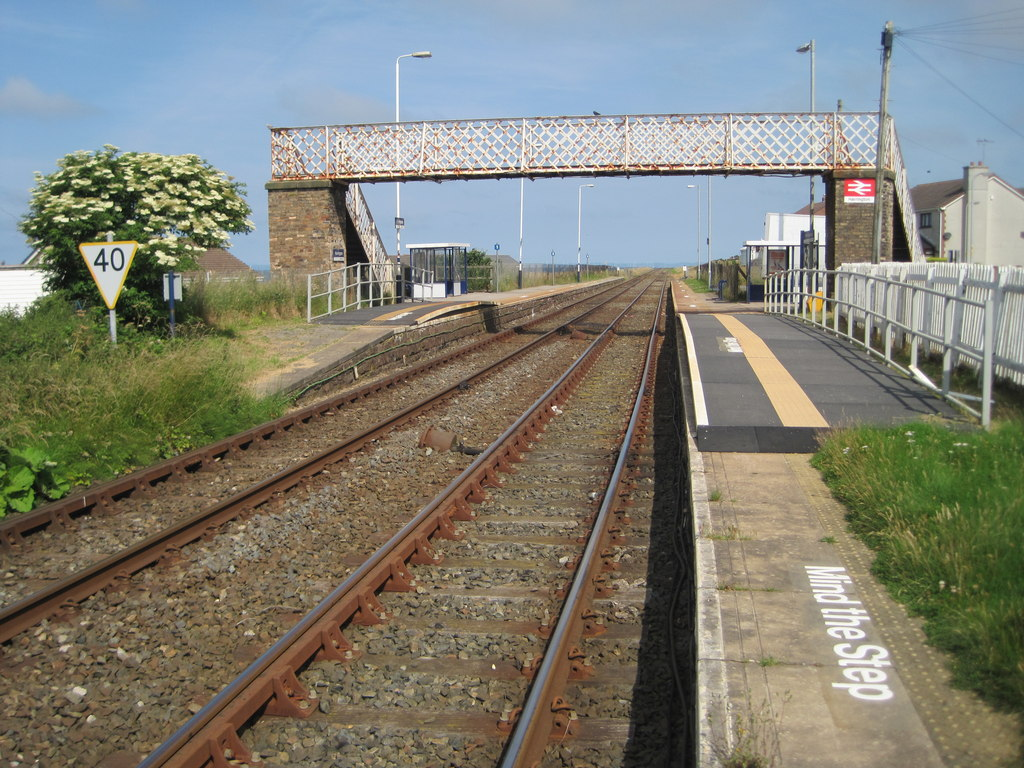
Harrington Hump
