= Balderas metro station =

Mexico City metro station

Balderas
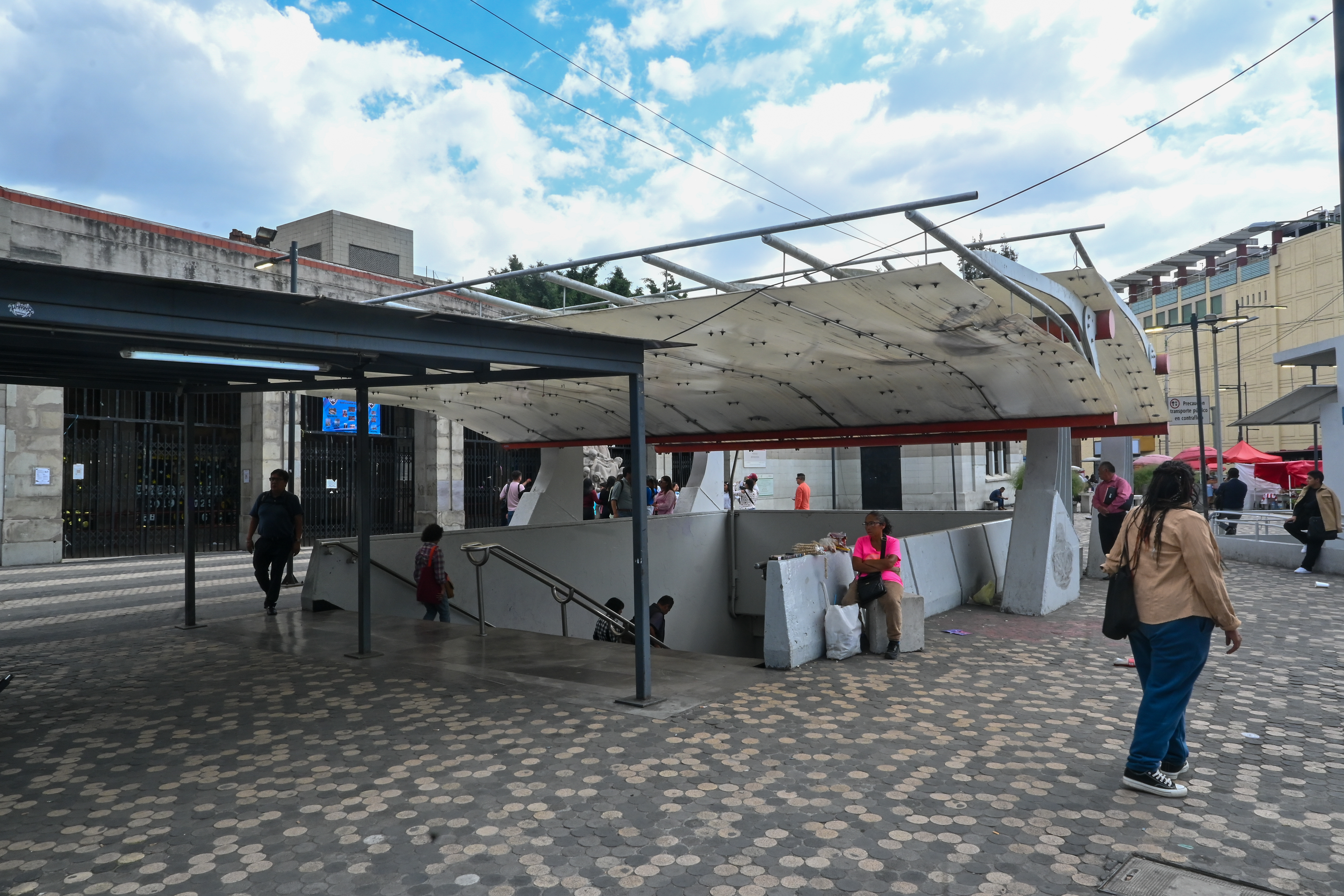
- Line 3 entrance

General information
- Location: Avenida Balderas; Cuauhtémoc; Mexico City; Mexico
- Coordinates: 19.42744°N 99.149036°W
- System: Mexico City Metro
- Operator: Sistema de Transporte Colectivo (STC)
- Platforms: 4 side platforms
- Tracks: 4
- Connections: Balderas; Balderas stop (temporary)

Construction
- Structure type: Underground
- Platform levels: 2
- Parking: No
- Cycle facilities: No
- Accessible: Yes

Other information
- Status: In service

History
- Opened: 4 September 1969; 57 years ago 20 November 1970; 55 years ago

Key dates
- 9 November 2023: Temporarily closed
- 13 September 2024: Reopened

Passengers
- 2025: Total: 9,820,333; 5,792,816 (Note: The data here is limited to the most recent ten years to avoid excessive listings; earlier figures can be found in this page's history or on the Mexico City Metro website. To calculate the average daily ridership, the annual total is divided by 365 days (366 in leap years), with decimals omitted from the result. Each station per line is ranked individually, as the system counts transfer stations separately. The percentage change is calculated automatically using the data from the current year and the previous year.); 4,027,517 ▼38.88%
- Rank: 84/195; 131/195

Services
Preceding station	Mexico City Metro	Following station
Cuauhtémoc toward Observatorio	Line 1	Salto del Agua toward Pantitlán
Juárez toward Indios Verdes	Line 3	Niños Héroes toward Universidad
Route map
Location
- Location within Mexico City
- Area map

Balderas is an underground station on the Mexico City Metro. It is located in the Cuauhtémoc borough in the center of Mexico City. It is a transfer station along Lines 1 and 3. Between 2023 and 2024, the Line 1 station was closed for modernization work on the tunnel and the line's technical equipment.

== Name and iconography ==
The station receives its name from the nearby Balderas street, which in turn was named in honor of Lucas Balderas, a Mexican military officer that participated in the Mexican–American War and was killed at the Battle of Molino del Rey in 1847. It is said that his last words were "poor country of mine".

The station pictogram depicts the colonial-era cannon preserved on the nearby Plaza de La Ciudadela. The cannon is a reminder of the Ten Tragic Days, which was a period a little bit longer than 10 days in which a coup the democratically elected government of Francisco I. Madero took place. This chapter would end with the murder of President Madero and Vice-President José María Pino Suárez, as well as the rise to the presidency of Victoriano Huerta.

== General information ==
Near Metro Balderas are the La Ciudadela market, filled with Mexican handicrafts, the José Vasconcelos Central Library of Mexico City, and facilities of broadcaster Televisa. Next to the library lies a tianguis (street market) full of books, comics, collectibles, etc.

This station has an information desk and facilities for the disabled. It also displays a plaque unveiled on 19 September 2004, celebrating Mexican rock musician Rockdrigo González, killed exactly 19 years earlier in the 1985 Mexico City earthquake and composer of a song titled "Metro Balderas". In September 2011 a real-size bronze statue of Rockdrigo was also unveiled inside the station.

Although this station is totally underground, cellular phone signals (GSM and TDMA for several providers) are able to reach the platform. The station also has charging stations for mobile devices.

== History ==
Metro Balderas was opened on 4 September 1969, as part of the first stage of Line 1, going from Chapultepec to Zaragoza.

The station became the network's second transfer station, when the first stretch of Line 3, from Tlatelolco to Hospital General, was opened in November 1970.

=== Incidents ===
On Friday, 18 September 2009 a mass shooting occurred on the platform. A man was tagging one of the station walls with a marker, therefore, he was confronted by a police officer. He reacted by taking out a gun and killing the officer and a construction worker who tried to disarm him, he also left five more wounded. The man later claimed that he committed the killings "in the name of God" and was sentenced to 151 years in prison.

The man who tried to disarm him was Esteban Cervantes Barrera.

On 29 December 2018, a woman gave birth to a child inside the station, at the Line 1 platforms, helped by personnel of the Mexican Red Cross.

== Nearby ==
- Biblioteca de México, public library.
- Escuela Libre de Derecho, law school.
- Televisa Chapultepec headquarters.
- Parque Tolsá, park.
- Centro Escolar Revolución, elementary school.

== Exits ==
=== Line 1 ===
- North: Tolsá street and Balderas, Centro
- South: Avenida Niños Héroes and Avenida Chapultepec, Colonia Doctores

=== Line 3 ===
- East: Avenida Arcos de Belén, Colonia Doctores
- Southeast: Avenida Niños Héroes and Dr. Río de la Loza street, Colonia Doctores

== Station layout ==
G	Street Level	Exit/Entrance
B1	Mezzanine for platform connection	Fare control/Ticket windows
	Side platform, doors will open on the right
	Westbound	← toward Observatorio (Cuauhtémoc)
	Eastbound	toward Pantitlán (Salto del Agua) →
Side platform, doors will open on the right
B2	Side platform, doors will open on the right
B2	Northbound	← toward Indios Verdes (Juárez)
B2	Southbound	toward Universidad (Niños Héroes) →
B2	Side platform, doors will open on the right

== Ridership ==
Annual passenger ridership (Line 1)
Year	Ridership	Average daily	Rank	% change	Ref.
2025	5,792,816	15,870	84/195	+267.87%
2024	1,574,684	4,302	177/195	−82.56%
2023	9,030,215	24,740	30/195	+26.49%
2022	7,139,186	19,559	46/195	+102.11%
2021	3,532,268	9,677	87/195	−14.52%
2020	4,132,493	11,290	87/195	−47.19%
2019	7,825,656	21,440	81/195	+4.21%
2018	7,509,318	20,573	86/195	−3.70%
2017	7,797,786	21,363	78/195	−4.89%
2016	8,198,425	22,400	78/195	−1.70%

Annual passenger ridership (Line 3)
Year	Ridership	Average daily	Rank	% change	Ref.
2025	4,027,517	11,034	131/195	−33.50%
2024	6,056,327	16,547	73/195	−13.94%
2023	7,037,585	19,281	57/195	+16.32%
2022	6,050,356	16,576	63/195	+368.70%
2021	1,290,882	3,526	162/195	−16.14%
2020	1,539,347	4,205	164/195	−45.80%
2019	2,840,045	7,780	170/195	+0.02%
2018	2,839,394	7,779	169/195	−0.48%
2017	2,852,962	7,816	167/195	−2.89%
2016	2,937,959	8,027	167/195	+3.74%

== Gallery ==
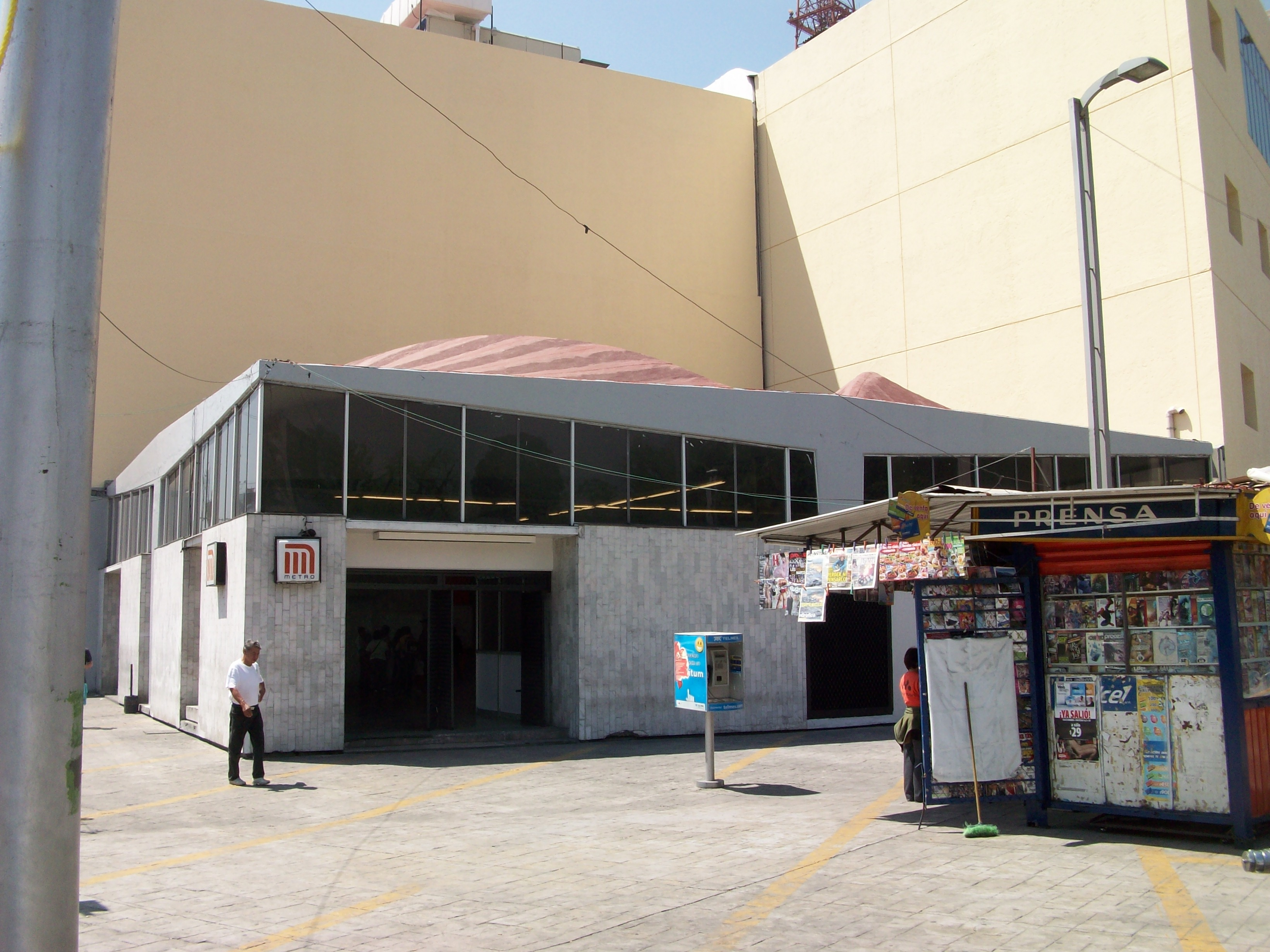
Entrance to the station in the corner of Avenida Chapultepec and Av. Niños Héroes

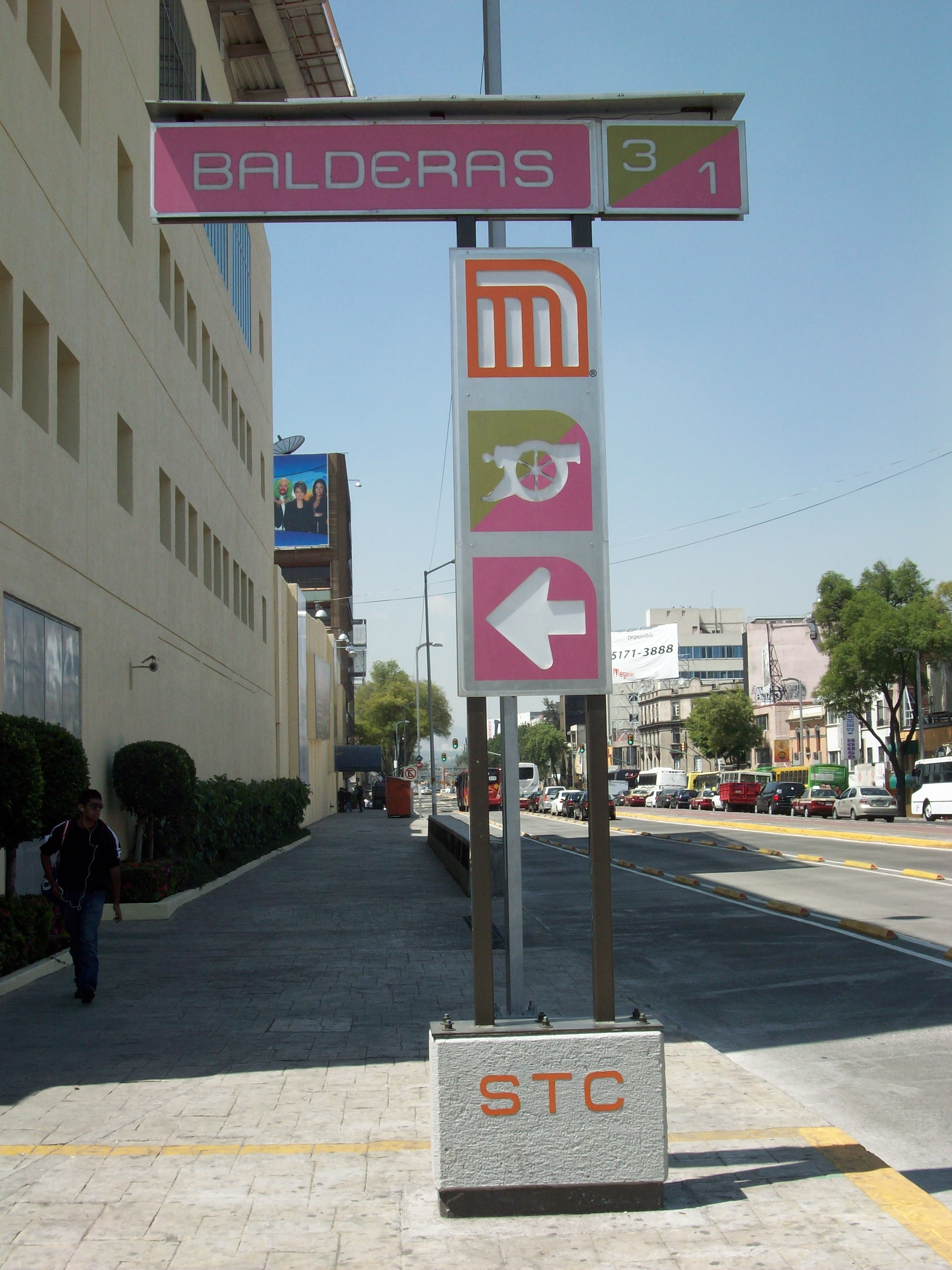
Entrance sign to the station

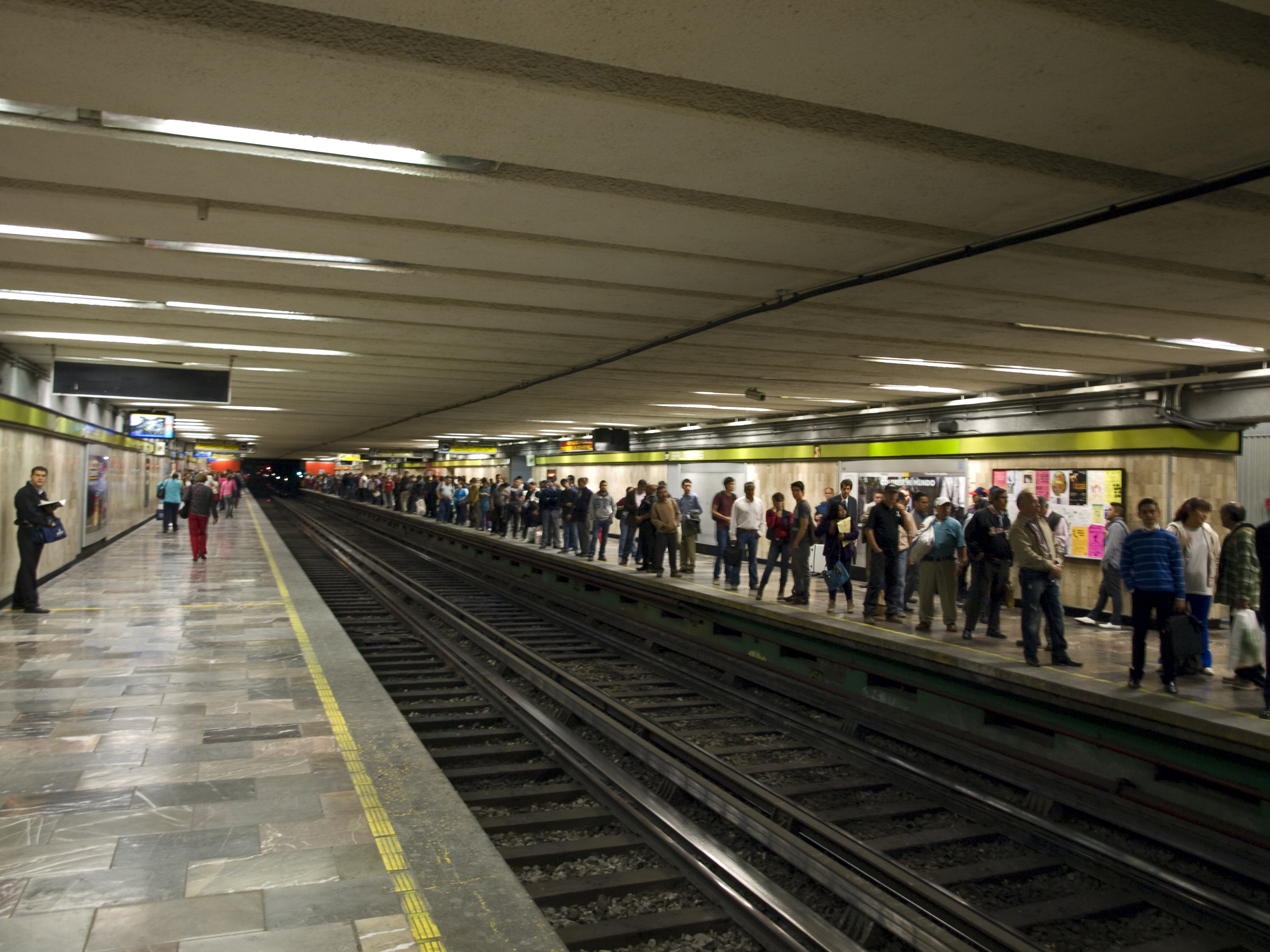
Line 3 platforms

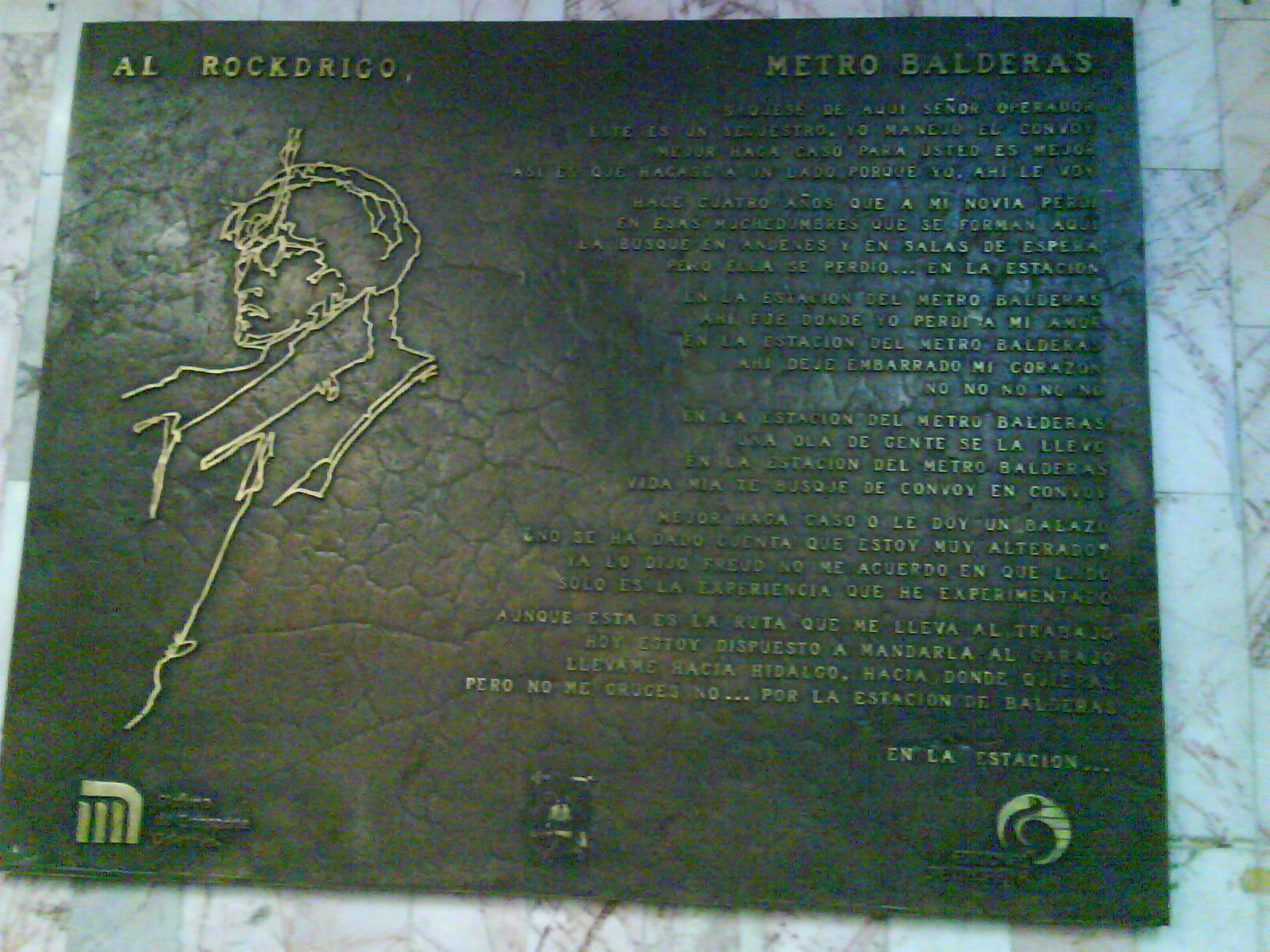
Commemorative plaque to Rockdrigo González

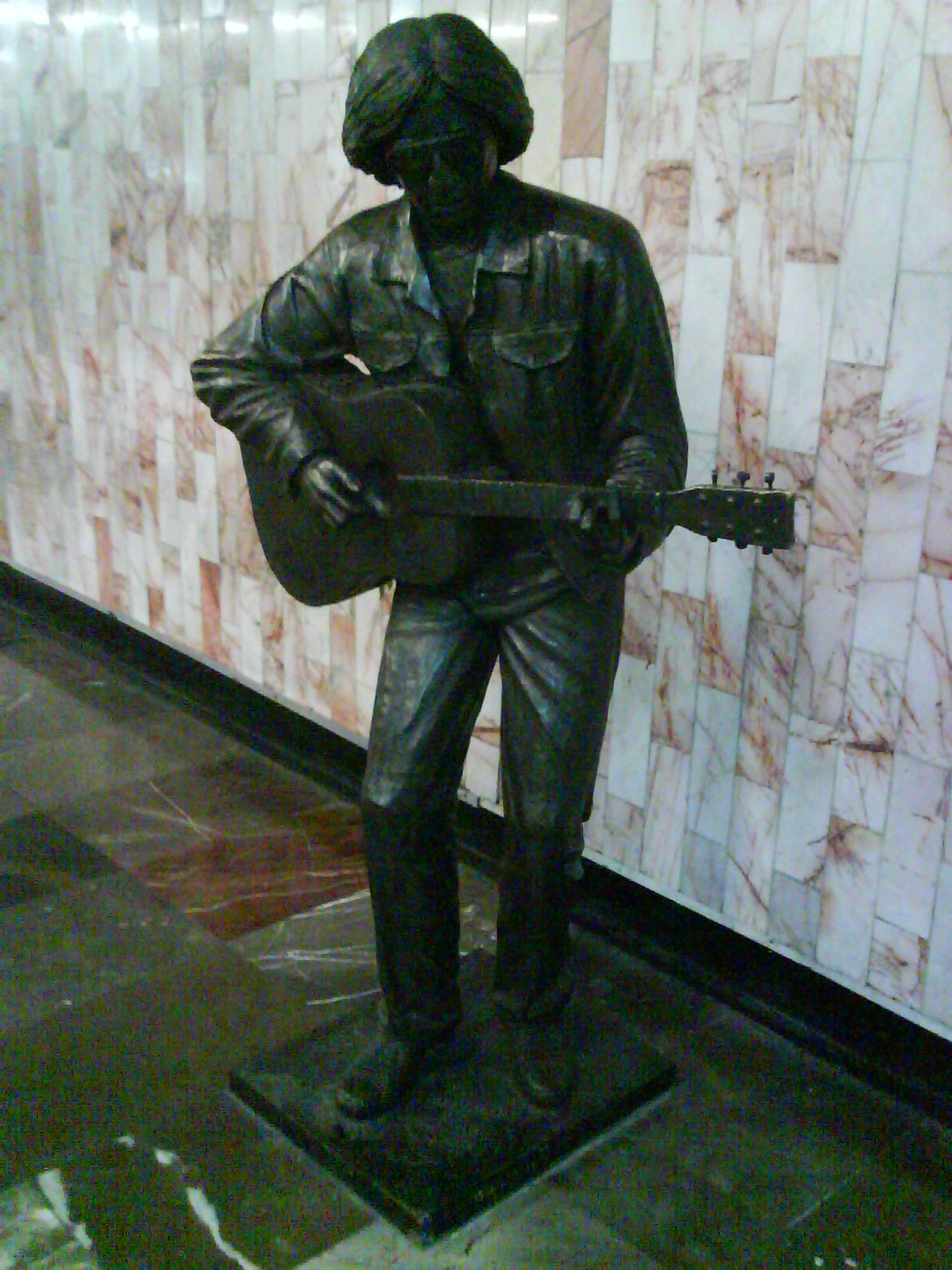
Statue honoring Rockdrigo
