= Cuauhtémoc metro station (Mexico City) =

Mexico City metro station

Cuauhtémoc
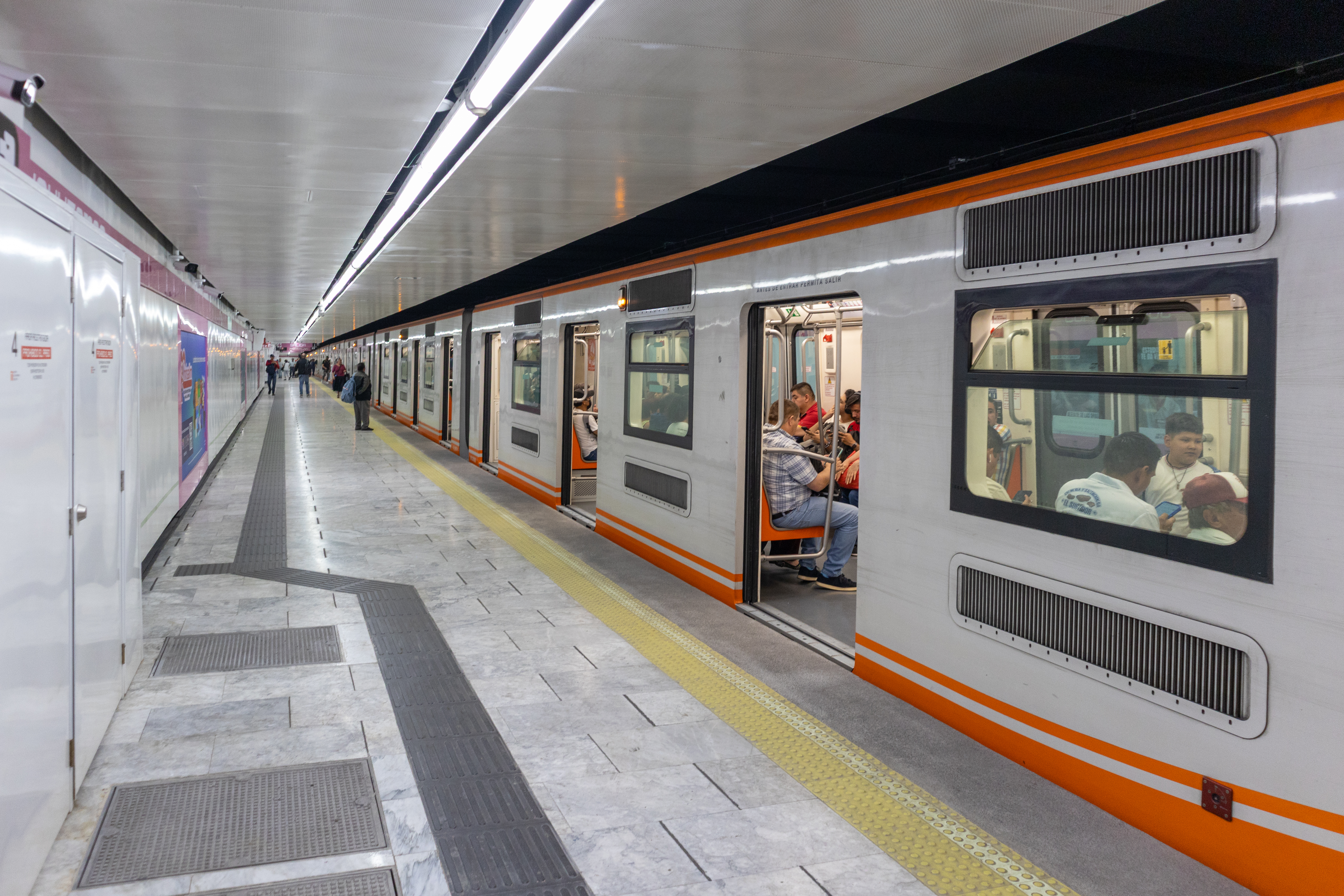
- Cuauhtémoc station, 2025

General information
- Location: Avenida Chapultepec; Cuauhtémoc; Mexico
- Coordinates: 19.425862°N 99.154701°W
- System: Mexico City Metro
- Operator: Sistema de Transporte Colectivo (STC)
- Platforms: 2
- Tracks: 2
- Connections: Cuauhtémoc; Cuauhtémoc stop (temporary)

Construction
- Structure type: Underground
- Accessible: Yes

Other information
- Status: In service

History
- Opened: 4 September 1969; 57 years ago

Passengers
- 2025: 3,027,738 (Note: The data here is limited to the most recent ten years to avoid excessive listings; earlier figures can be found in this page's history or on the Mexico City Metro website. To calculate the average daily ridership, the annual total is divided by 365 days (366 in leap years), with decimals omitted from the result. Each station per line is ranked individually, as the system counts transfer stations separately. The percentage change is calculated automatically using the data from the current year and the previous year.)
- Rank: 150/195

Services
Preceding station	Mexico City Metro	Following station
Insurgentes toward Observatorio	Line 1	Balderas toward Pantitlán
Route map
Location
- Location within Mexico City
- Area map

Cuauhtémoc is a metro station on the Mexico City Metro Line 1. It is located at the northern extreme of Avenida Cuauhtémoc, in the Cuauhtémoc borough, in the center of Mexico City. From November 2023 to April 2025, the station remained closed for modernization work on the tunnel and the line's technical equipment.

== Name and pictogram ==
The station logo depicts the head of an eagle. The station, avenue, and borough were all named after the Aztec Emperor Cuauhtémoc, whose name means "descending eagle" in Nahuatl. The station receives its name due to being located at the intersection of Avenida Chapultepec and Avenida Cuauhtémoc, in the limits of the Juárez, Roma Norte, Centro and Doctores neighborhoods.

== General information ==
This metro station is located near a number of landmarks, such as the up-market Roma and Juárez neighborhoods and the elegant tree-lined boulevard that is Paseo de la Reforma. Also nearby are two museums, the Ripley's Believe It or Not! museum and the Mexico City Wax Museum.

After renovation works that began in 2022, the station was reopened on April 23, 2025.

=== Ridership ===
Annual passenger ridership
Year	Ridership	Average daily	Rank	% change	Ref.
2025	3,027,738	8,295	150/195	NA
2024	0	0	189/195	−100.00%
2023	2,563,966	7,024	141/195	−38.88%
2022	4,194,986	11,493	102/195	+3.46%
2021	4,054,718	11,108	74/195	−7.73%
2020	4,394,193	12,005	80/195	−47.13%
2019	8,311,511	22,771	67/195	+0.92%
2018	8,235,598	22,563	73/195	+5.42%
2017	7,812,188	21,403	76/195	−8.23%
2016	8,512,525	23,258	71/195	+1.94%

== Gallery ==
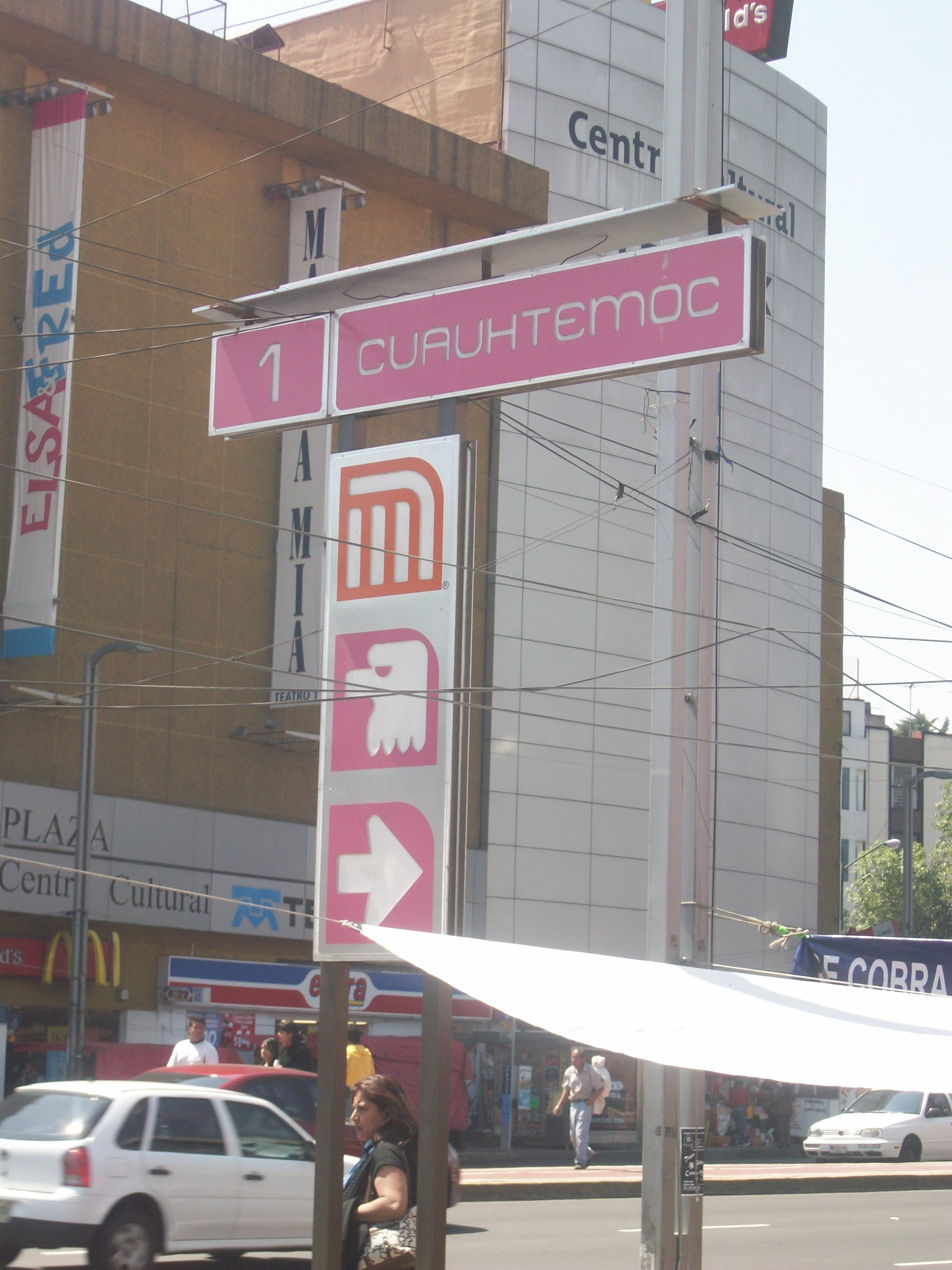
Entry sign to the station
