= Pino Suárez metro station =

Mexico City metro station

Pino Suárez
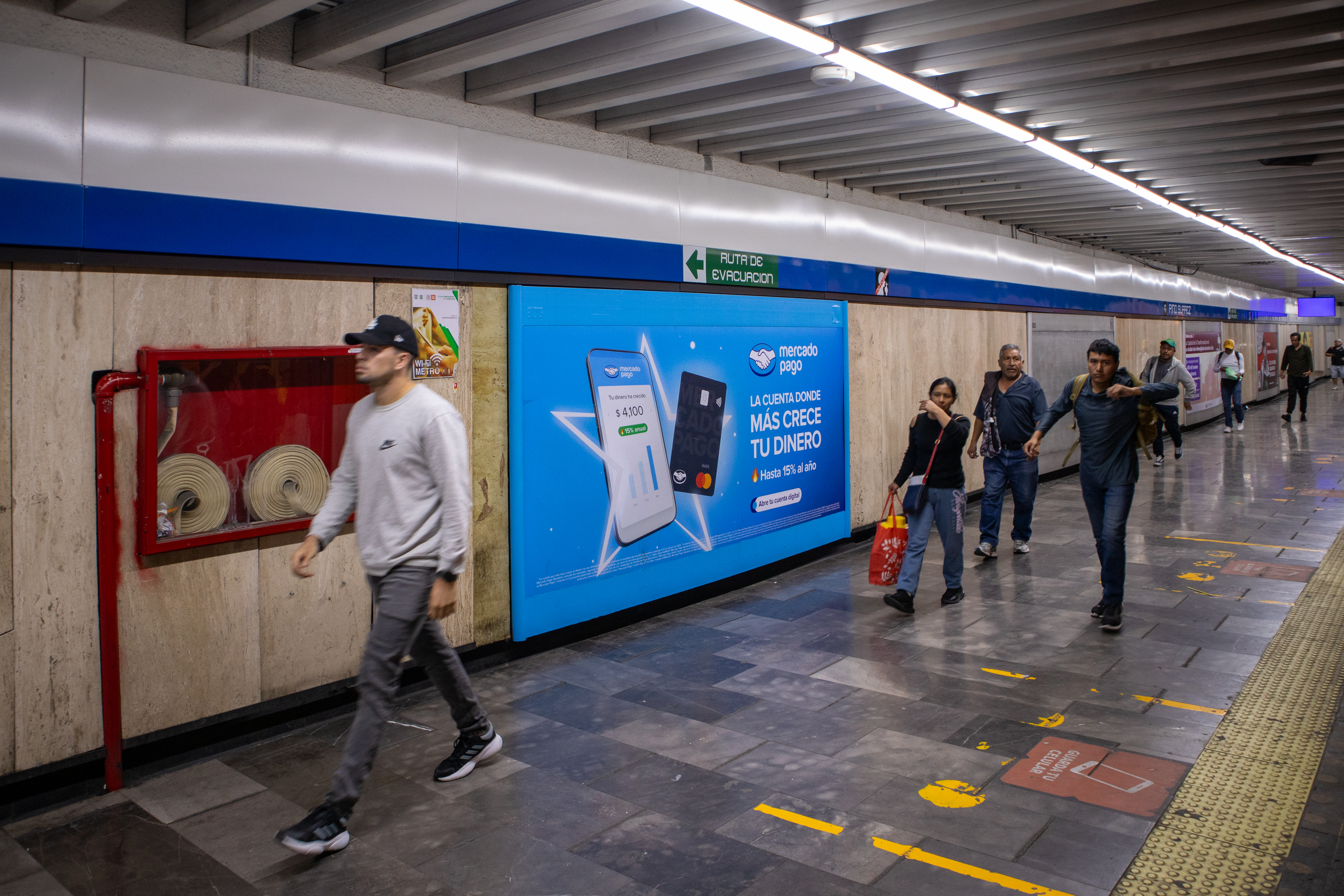
- Line 2 platforms

General information
- Location: Centro; Mexico City; Mexico
- Coordinates: 19.425336°N 99.132943°W
- System: Mexico City Metro
- Operator: Sistema de Transporte Colectivo (STC)
- Platforms: 4 side platforms
- Tracks: 4
- Connections: Pino Suárez; Routes: 2-A, 31-B, 111-A, 145-A

Construction
- Structure type: Underground
- Accessible: Yes

Other information
- Status: In service

History
- Opened: 4 September 1969; 56 years ago 1 August 1970; 56 years ago

Key dates
- 11 July 2022: Temporarily closed
- 29 October 2023: Reopened

Passengers
- 2025: Total: 19,652,259; 8,813,407 (Note: The data here is limited to the most recent ten years to avoid excessive listings; earlier figures can be found in this page's history or on the Mexico City Metro website. To calculate the average daily ridership, the annual total is divided by 365 days (366 in leap years), with decimals omitted from the result. Each station per line is ranked individually, as the system counts transfer stations separately. The percentage change is calculated automatically using the data from the current year and the previous year.); 10,838,852 ▲39.9%
- Rank: 40/195; 25/195

Services
Preceding station	Mexico City Metro	Following station
Isabel la Católica toward Observatorio	Line 1	Merced toward Pantitlán
Zócalo toward Cuatro Caminos	Line 2	San Antonio Abad toward Tasqueña
Route map
Location
- Location within Mexico City
- Area map

Pino Suárez is a station on Line 1 and Line 2 of the Mexico City Metro system. It is located in the Cuauhtémoc borough of Mexico City, on the southern part of the city center. From July 2022 to October 2023, the Line 1 station was closed due to modernization works on the tunnel and the line's technical equipment.

== Name and pictogram ==
The station is named after José María Pino Suárez, Vice President of Mexico during the term of Francisco I. Madero (1911–1913). However, the station logo depicts a pyramid dedicated to Ehecatl, the Aztec god of wind. This pyramid was discovered in the early construction of the station and it can be seen on display along the main transfer corridor.

== General information ==
The station is located at the intersection of José María Pino Suárez and José María Izazaga avenues in downtown Mexico City, a few blocks from the Zócalo.

The Ehecatl pyramid was found during the construction of the station in 1967. While excavating was unearthed a round-shaped altar and was decided to let the pyramid remains and allow the National Institute of Archeology and History (INAH) to preserve and maintain it.

This pyramid is the smallest archaeological zone in Mexico and is thought to have been part of a larger ceremonial center. The Ehecatl pyramid has 4 structural construction stages and it counts on a circular base that functioned as a pedestal for the deity placed at the top. Inside the pyramid have been found a few offerings.

Pino Suárez was opened on 5 September 1969. The station is an important link to the centre of the city. It was the first transfer station of the network and it connects the two busiest lines. Pino Suárez has many corridors, the most notable among them being the Pasaje Zócalo–Pino Suárez that connects with Metro Zócalo at the north side, filled with bookstores and a mini-cinema; other corridors have cultural displays and temporary exhibitions. The station also has an information desk.

=== Ridership ===
Annual passenger ridership (Line 1)
Year	Ridership	Average daily	Rank	% change	Ref.
2025	8,813,407	24,146	40/195	−5.28%
2024	9,304,360	25,421	35/195	+479.20%
2023	1,606,411	4,401	167/195	−57.73%
2022	3,800,443	10,412	115/195	−57.06%
2021	8,849,949	24,246	18/195	+10.21%
2020	8,030,147	21,940	22/195	−29.90%
2019	11,456,022	31,386	37/195	+2.94%
2018	11,129,108	30,490	40/195	−9.21%
2017	12,258,193	33,584	30/195	−1.51%
2016	12,445,853	34,005	31/195	+0.74%

Annual passenger ridership (Line 2)
Year	Ridership	Average daily	Rank	% change	Ref.
2025	10,838,852	29,695	25/195	−12.87%
2024	12,440,452	33,083	15/195	+49.85%
2023	12,440,452	33,083	15/195	+49.85%
2022	8,301,870	22,744	30/195	+146.58%
2021	3,366,820	9,224	93/195	−41.64%
2020	5,768,921	15,762	46/195	−39.53%
2019	9,540,733	26,138	54/195	+4.51%
2018	9,128,760	25,010	56/195	−0.30%
2017	9,155,813	25,084	52/195	−4.60%
2016	9,597,356	26,294	52/195	+2.19%

== Exits ==
=== Line 1 ===
- North: Av. José María Izazaga and Av. José María Pino Suárez, Col. Centro
- West: Av. José María Izazaga and Av. José María Pino Suárez, Col. Centro

=== Line 2 ===
- South: San Lucas street and Av. Fray Servando Teresa de Mier, Col. Centro
- North: Av. José María Izazaga and Calzada San Antonio Abad, Col. Centro

== Gallery ==
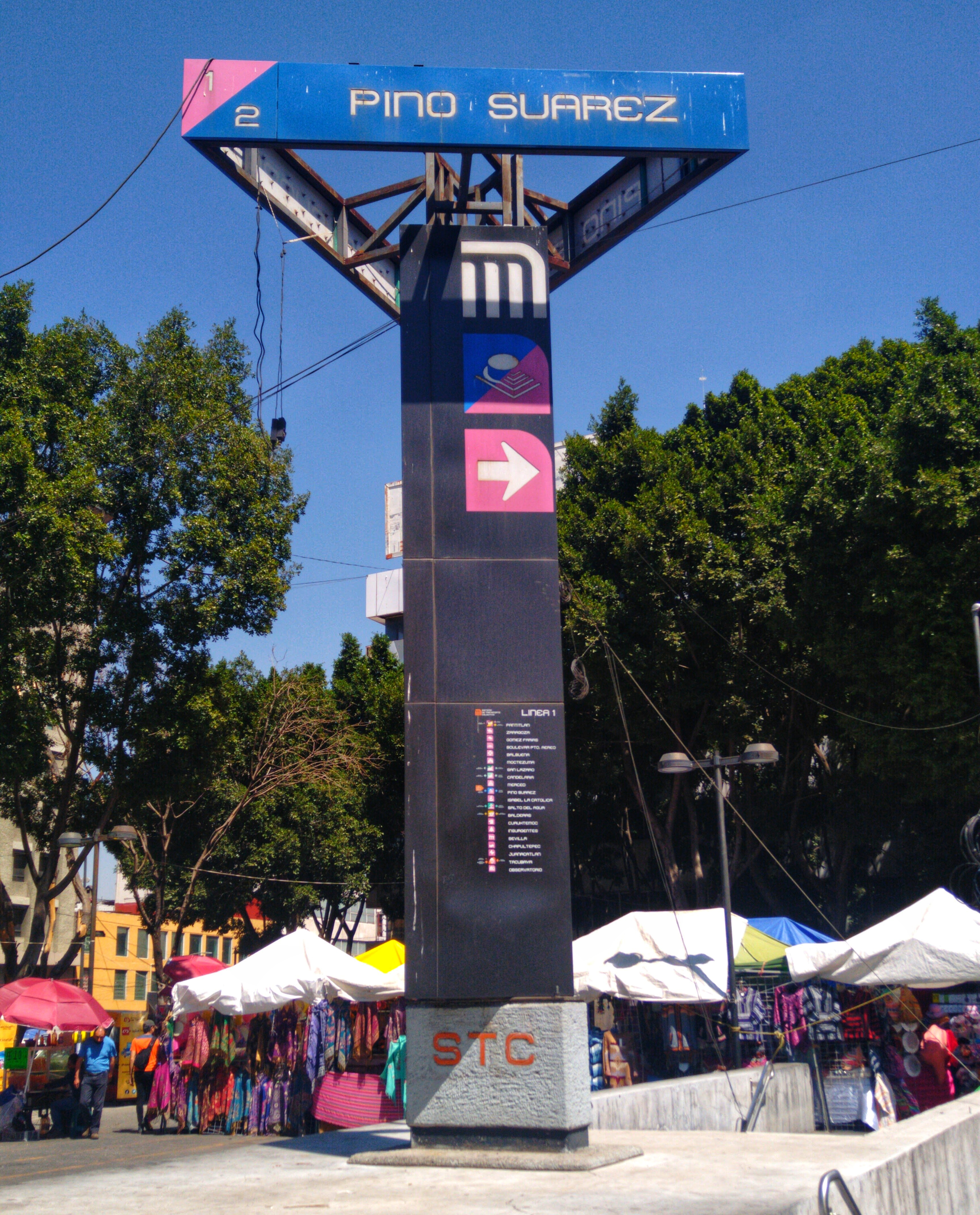
Entry sign for Metro Pino Suárez

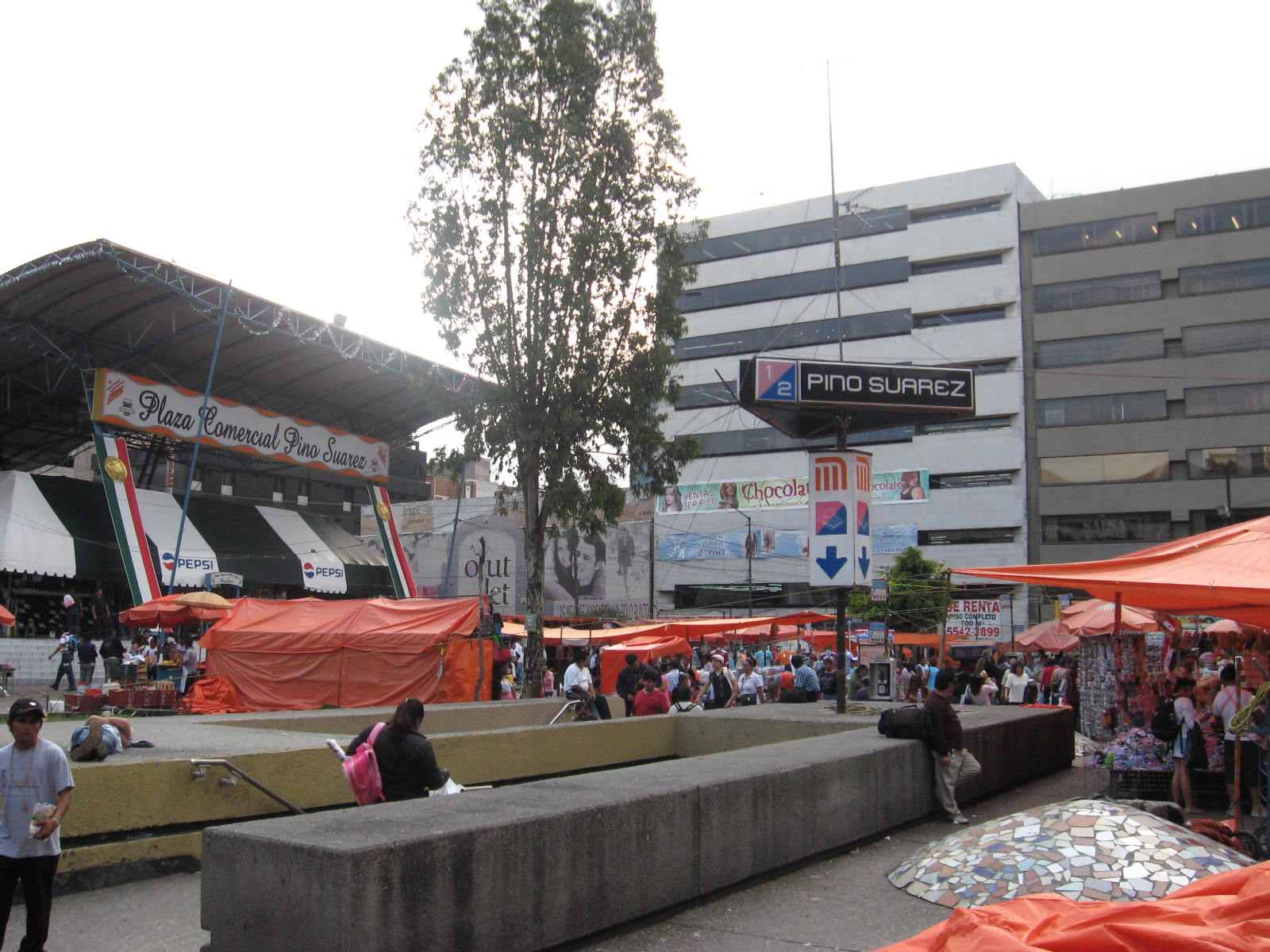
One entrance to Metro Pino Suarez

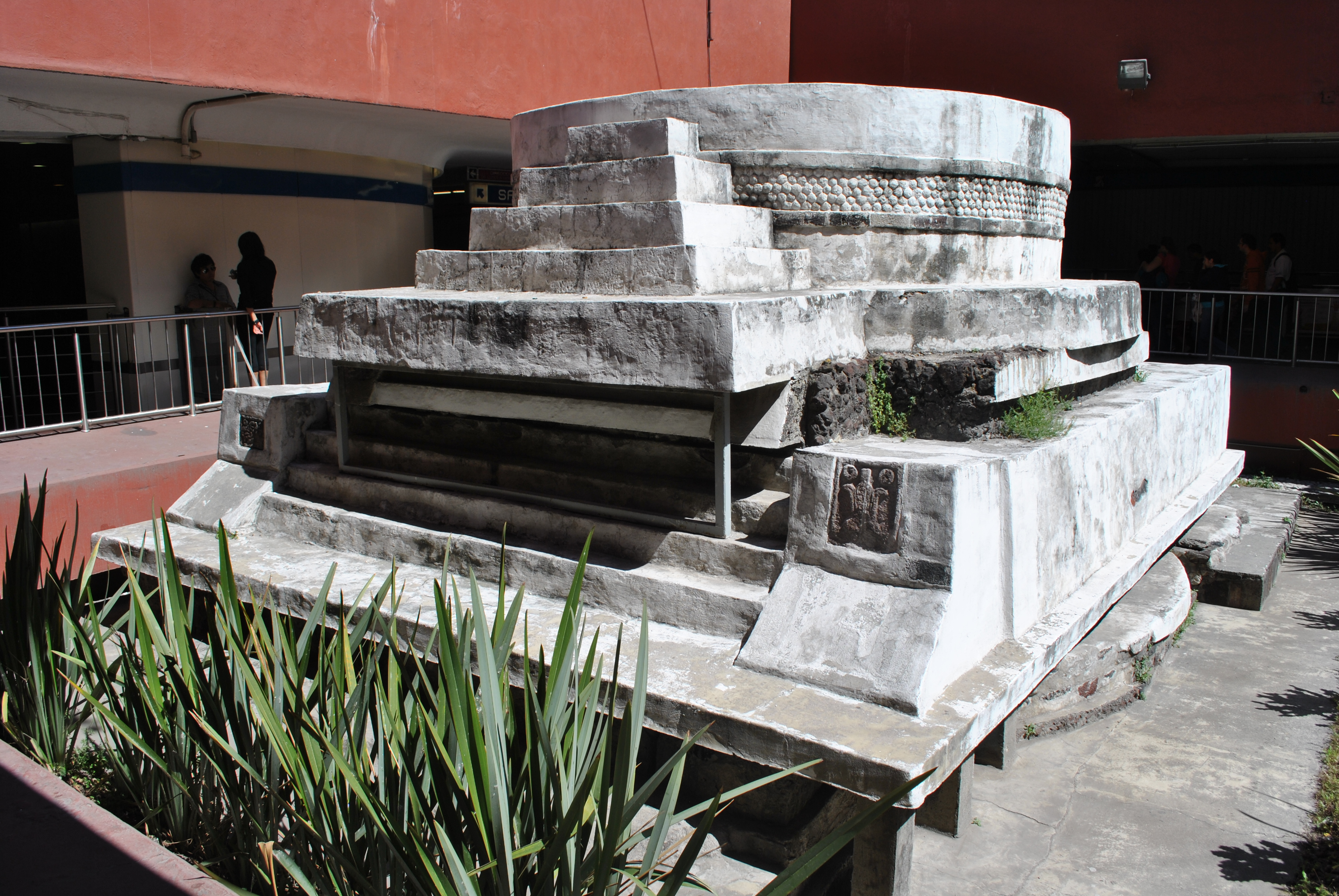
Altar dedicated to the god Ehécatl, located in the middle of Metro Pino Suárez. This altar was unearthed during construction of the station in 1967 where it remains to this day surrounded by the passageway between Lines 1 and 2

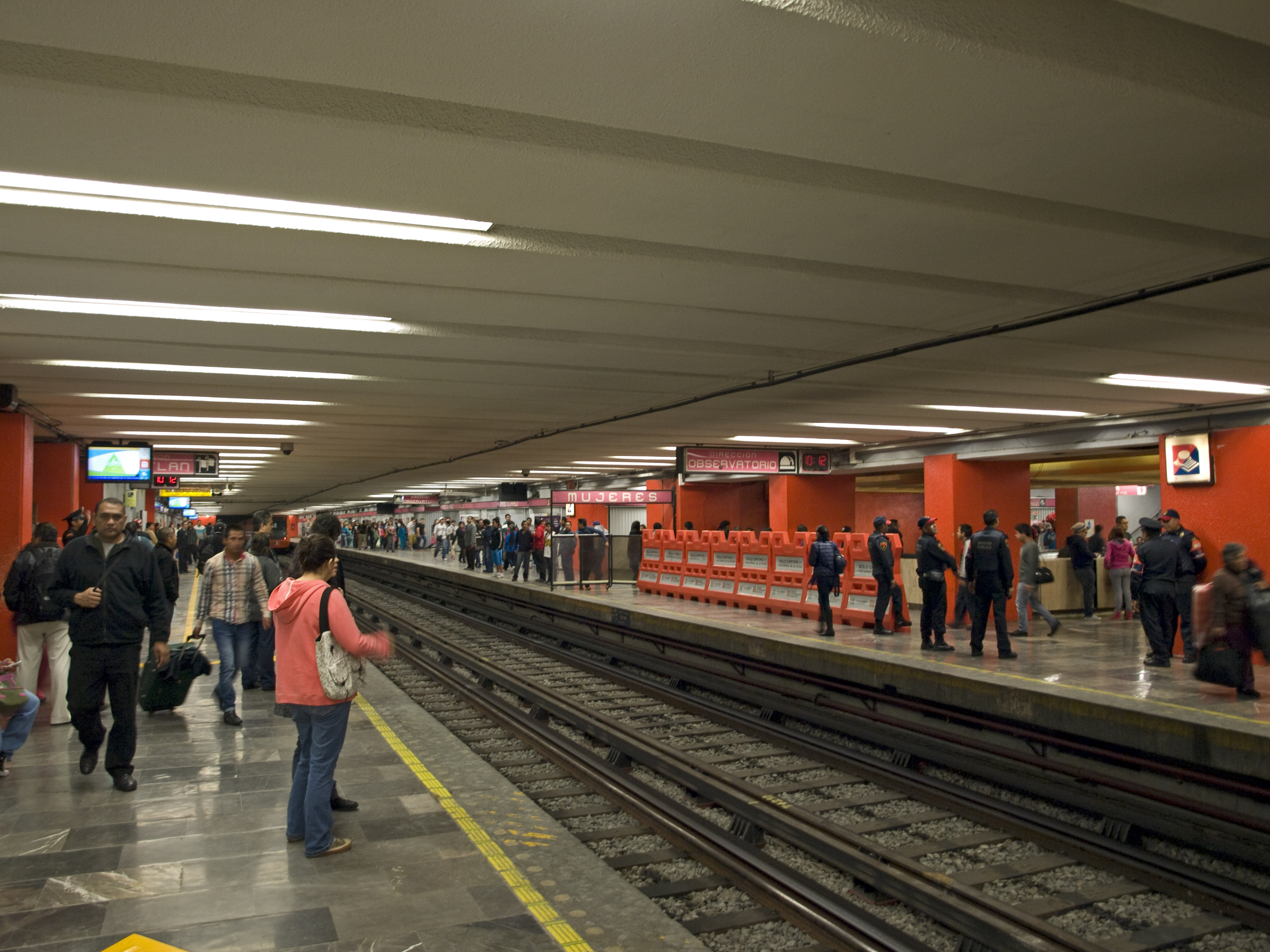
Line 1 platforms

== See also ==
- List of Mexico City metro stations
