= Juanacatlán metro station =

Mexico City metro station

Juanacatlán
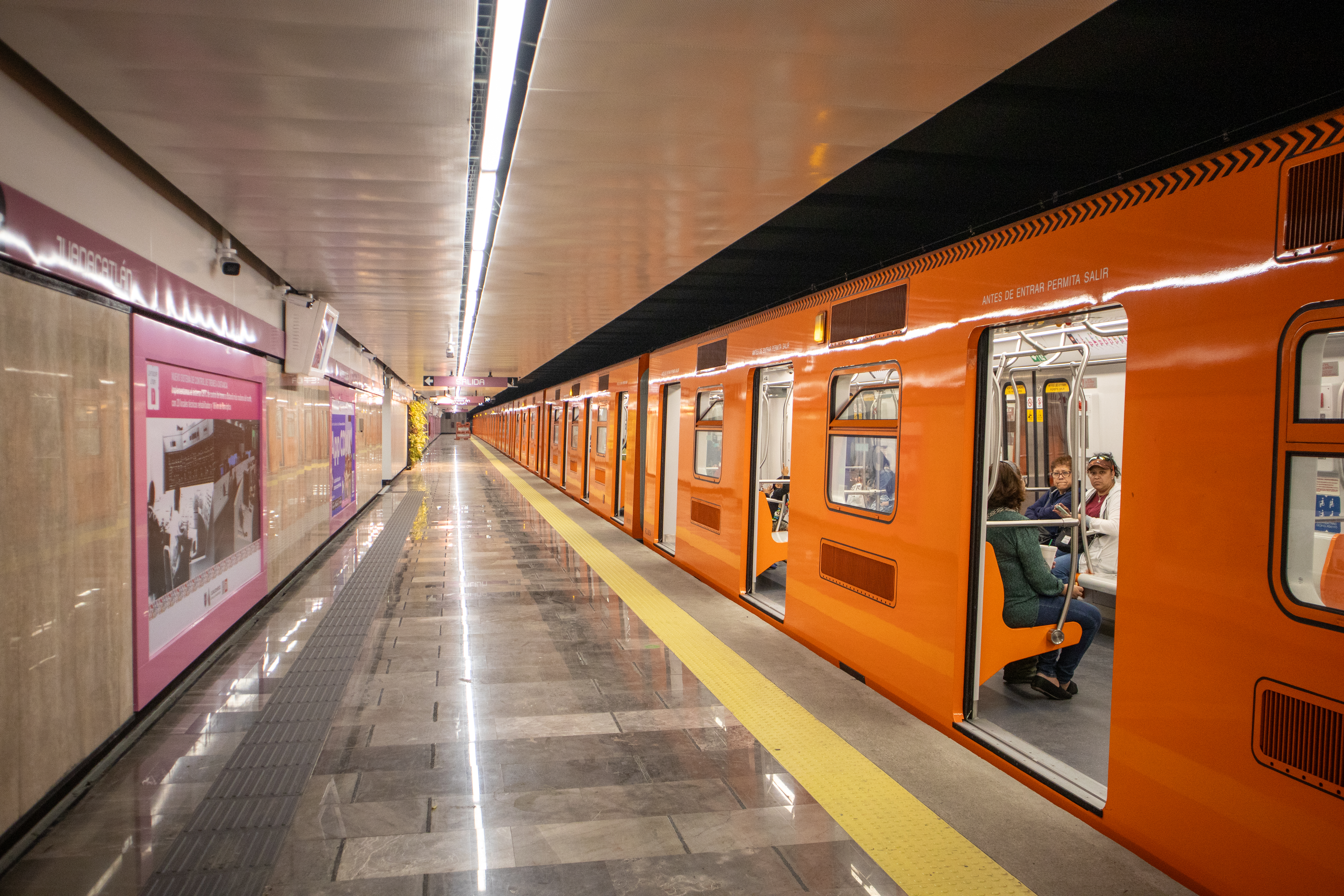
- Station in 2025

General information
- Location: San Miguel Chapultepec, Miguel Hidalgo; Mexico City; Mexico
- Coordinates: 19.41289°N 99.182167°W
- System: Mexico City Metro
- Operator: Sistema de Transporte Colectivo (STC)
- Platforms: 2
- Tracks: 2
- Connections: Juanacatlán stop (temporary)

Construction
- Structure type: Underground

Other information
- Status: In service

History
- Opened: 11 April 1970; 56 years ago

Passengers
- 2025: 227,089 (Note: The data here is limited to the most recent ten years to avoid excessive listings; earlier figures can be found in this page's history or on the Mexico City Metro website. To calculate the average daily ridership, the annual total is divided by 365 days (366 in leap years), with decimals omitted from the result. Each station per line is ranked individually, as the system counts transfer stations separately. The percentage change is calculated automatically using the data from the current year and the previous year.)
- Rank: 195/195

Services
Preceding station	Mexico City Metro	Following station
Tacubaya toward Observatorio	Line 1	Chapultepec toward Pantitlán
Route map
Location
- Location within Mexico City
- Area map

Juanacatlán is a metro station on the Mexico City Metro. It is located in Mexico City's Miguel Hidalgo borough in the San Miguel Chapultepec neighborhood, and lies on Line 1 of the Metro. In 2019 the station had an average ridership of 11,669 passengers per day, making it the least used station in Line 1. From 2023 to 2025, the station was closed for modernization work on the tunnel and the line's technical equipment.

== Name and pictogram ==
When the station opened in 1970, it was originally named for the street that was in front of the station, Juanacatlán (the name of the street changed and it is now known as Alfonso Reyes, in honor of the Mexican writer, philosopher and diplomat).

The street was in turn named for Juanacatlán in the state of Jalisco. Xonacatlan, means "place of onions" (sometimes mistakenly read as meaning "place of butterflies") in Nahuatl. Therefore, the station's pictogram depicts a butterfly.

== General information ==
The station was opened on 11 April 1970.

The station's building also contains the offices of the Metro workers' trade union, the windows of which depict the front of a metro train. This station runs under Avenida Pedro Antonio de los Santos. It serves the San Miguel Chapultepec and Condesa districts.

From 23 April to 23 June 2020, the station was temporarily closed due to the COVID-19 pandemic in Mexico.

=== Ridership ===
Annual passenger ridership
Year	Ridership	Average daily	Rank	% change	Ref.
2025	227,089	622	195/195	NA
2024	0	0	189/195	−100.00%
2023	1,904,169	5,216	158/195	−11.30%
2022	2,146,807	5,881	147/195	+15.44%
2021	1,859,621	5,094	143/195	+4.69%
2020	1,776,279	4,853	158/195	−58.30%
2019	4,259,229	11,669	143/195	−1.29%
2018	4,314,756	11,821	142/195	+3.88%
2017	4,153,639	11,379	140/195	−6.58%
2016	4,446,100	12,147	136/195	−2.21%

== Entrances ==
- Northeast: Av. Pedro Antonio de los Santos, San Miguel Chapultepec
- East: Circuito Interior Maestro José Vasconcelos, San Miguel Chapultepec
- Southwest: Av. Pedro Antonio de los Santos, San Miguel Chapultepec

== Gallery ==
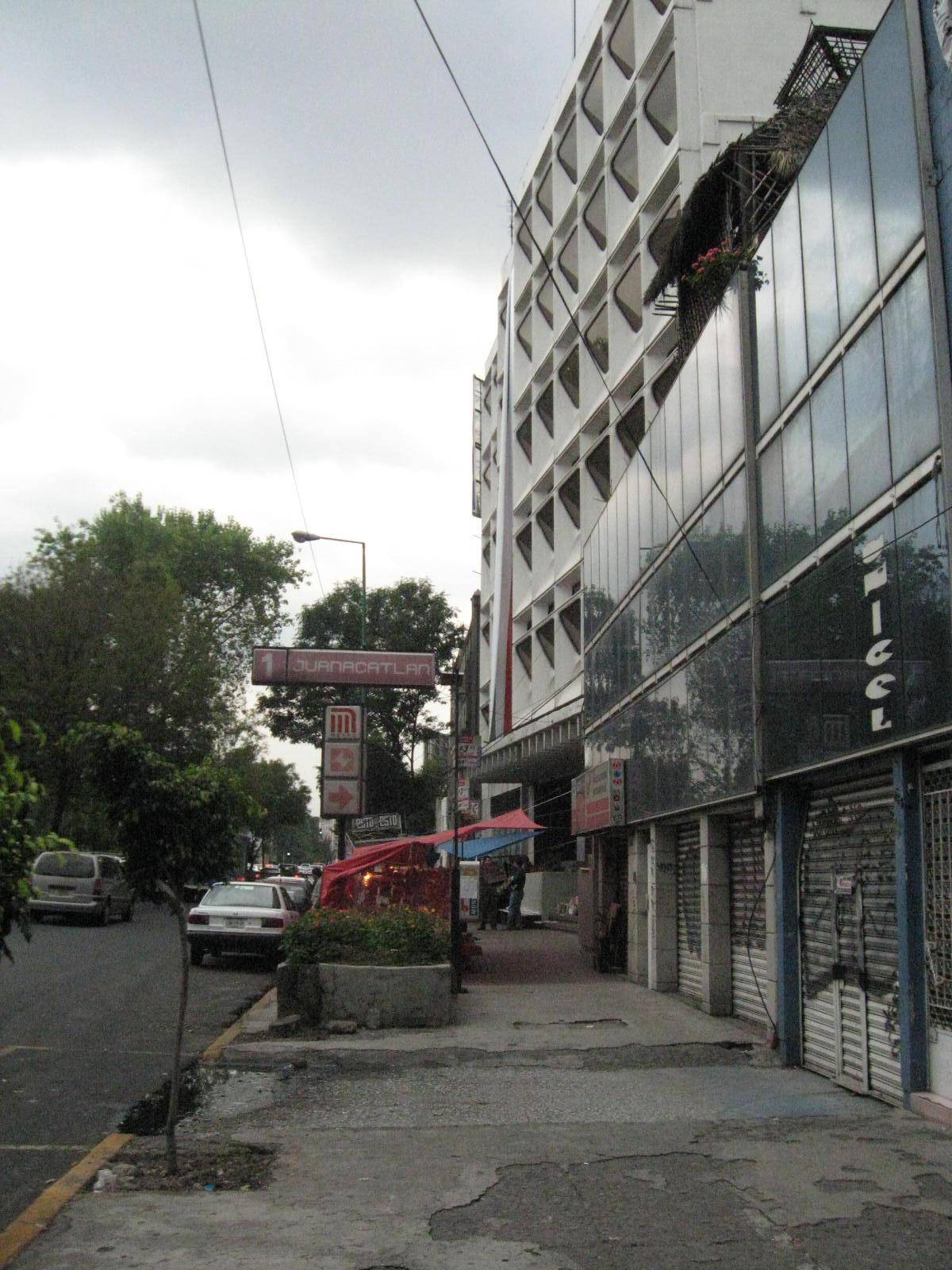
Entrance to the station on Circuito Interior Maestro José Vasconcelos

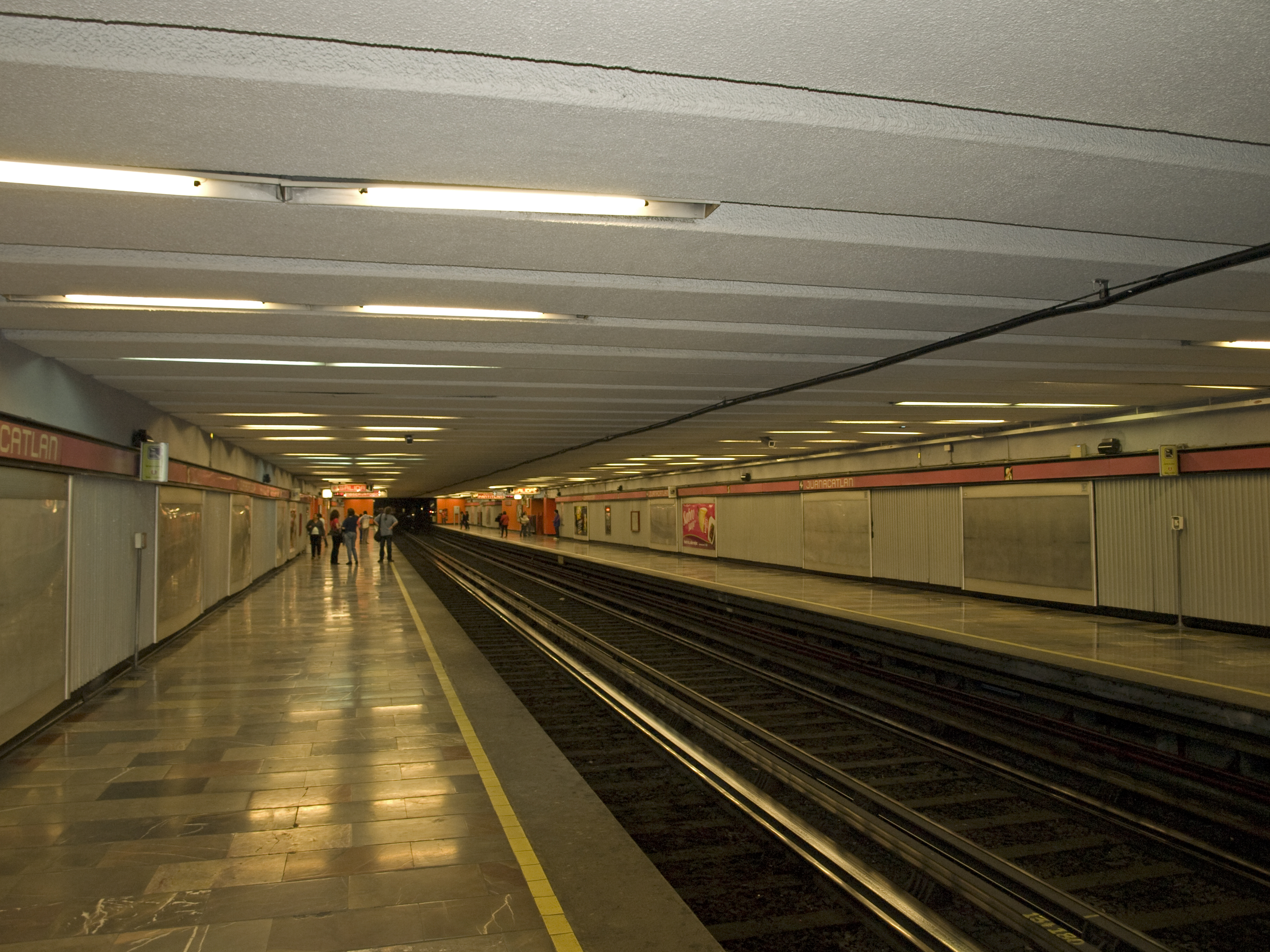
Station platforms

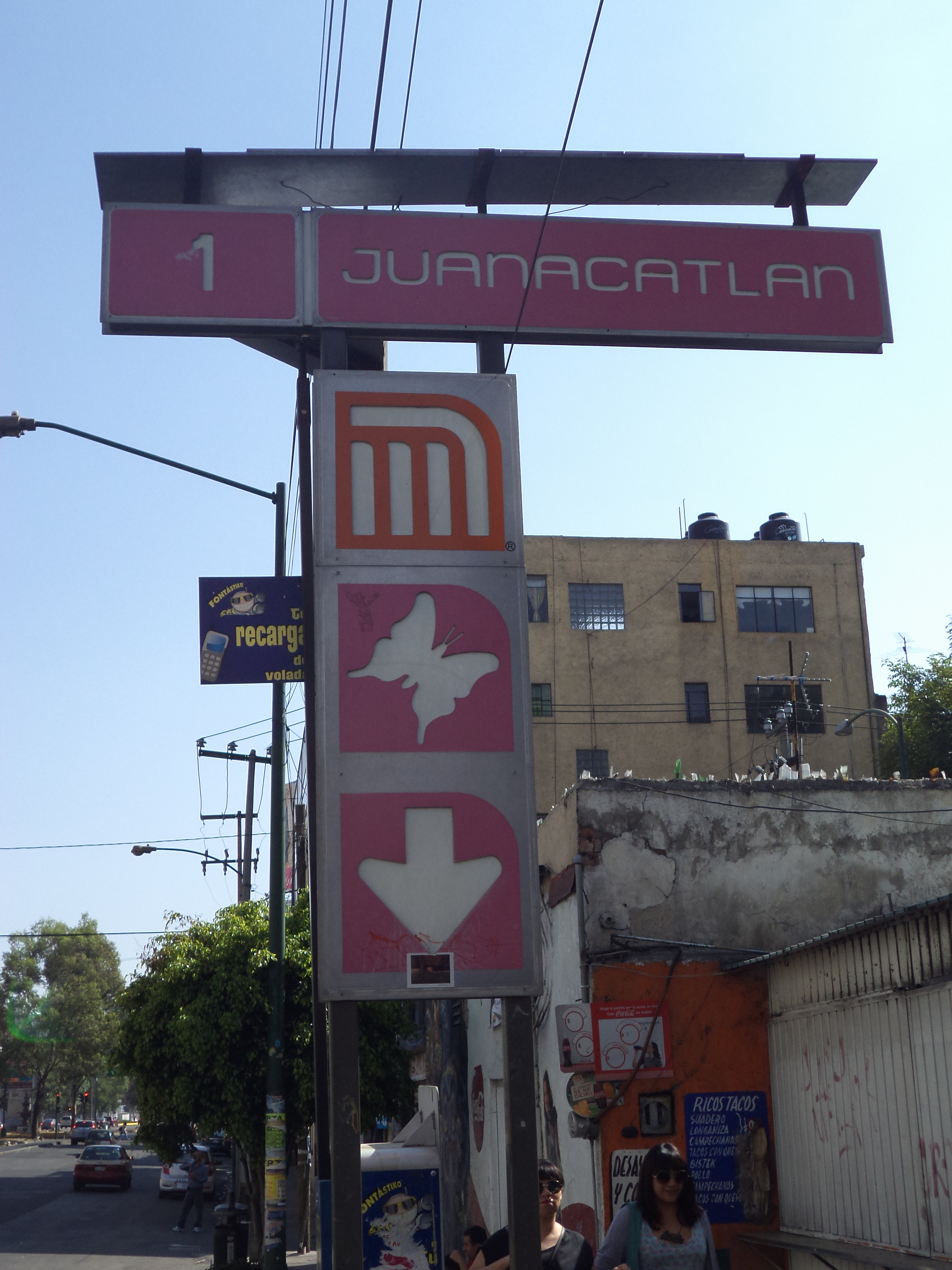
Entry sign to the station
