= Isabel la Católica metro station =

Mexico City metro station

Isabel la Católica
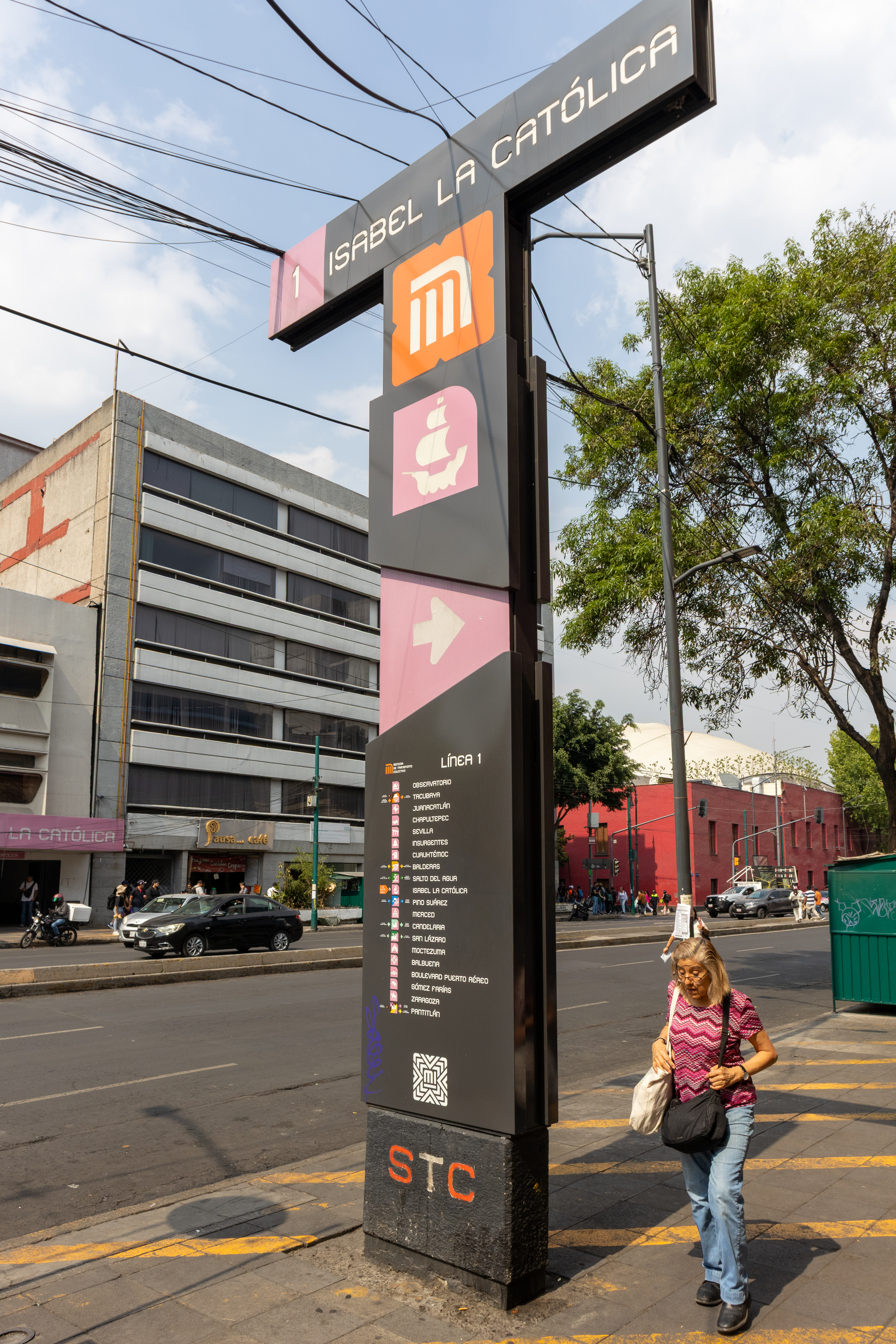

General information
- Location: Av. José María Izazaga and Isabel la Católica; Centro, Cuauhtémoc; Mexico City; Mexico
- Coordinates: 19.426732°N 99.137685°W
- System: Mexico City Metro
- Operator: Sistema de Transporte Colectivo (STC)
- Platforms: 2 side platforms
- Tracks: 2

Construction
- Structure type: Underground
- Platform levels: 1
- Parking: No
- Cycle facilities: No
- Accessible: Yes

Other information
- Status: In service

History
- Opened: 4 September 1969; 56 years ago

Key dates
- 9 July 2022; 4 years ago: Temporarily closed
- 29 October 2023; 2 years ago: Reopened

Passengers
- 2025: 4,815,351 (Note: The data here is limited to the most recent ten years to avoid excessive listings; earlier figures can be found in this page's history or on the Mexico City Metro website. To calculate the average daily ridership, the annual total is divided by 365 days (366 in leap years), with decimals omitted from the result. Each station per line is ranked individually, as the system counts transfer stations separately. The percentage change is calculated automatically using the data from the current year and the previous year.) ▲317.75%
- Rank: 108/195

Services
Preceding station	Mexico City Metro	Following station
Salto del Agua toward Observatorio	Line 1	Pino Suárez toward Pantitlán
Route map
Location
- Location within Mexico City
- Area map

Isabel la Católica is a metro station on the Mexico City Metro. It is located in the Colonia Centro neighborhood in the Cuauhtémoc borough in Mexico City's downtown. The station closed on 9 July 2022 for modernization work on the tunnel and the line's technical equipment. It was partly reopened in October 2023.

== General information ==
Its logo represents one of Christopher Columbus's three caravels. Its name comes from nearby Avenida Isabel La Católica, named after Queen Isabel of Castile, who helped Columbus finance his journeys to the Americas. The station was opened on 5 September 1969.

=== Ridership ===
Annual passenger ridership
Year	Ridership	Average daily	Rank	% change	Ref.
2025	4,815,351	13,192	108/195	+317.75%
2024	1,152,679	3,149	181/195	NA
2023	0	0	188/195	−100.00%
2022	3,196,934	8,758	126/195	−30.63%
2021	4,608,832	12,626	59/195	+1.09%
2020	4,559,016	12,456	73/195	−44.82%
2019	8,262,282	22,636	69/195	−2.75%
2018	8,495,815	23,276	65/195	−1.32%
2017	8,609,467	23,587	64/195	−0.71%
2016	8,671,069	23,691	67/195	+2.07%

== Nearby ==
- University of the Cloister of Sor Juana, private university located in the former San Jerónimo Convent.
- Museo de Charrería, museum dedicated to the sport and tradition of the charreada.

== Exits ==
- North: Avenida José María Izazaga and Isabel la Católica, Centro
- South: Avenida José María Izazaga and Isabel la Católica, Centro
