= Chapultepec metro station =

Mexico City metro station

Chapultepec
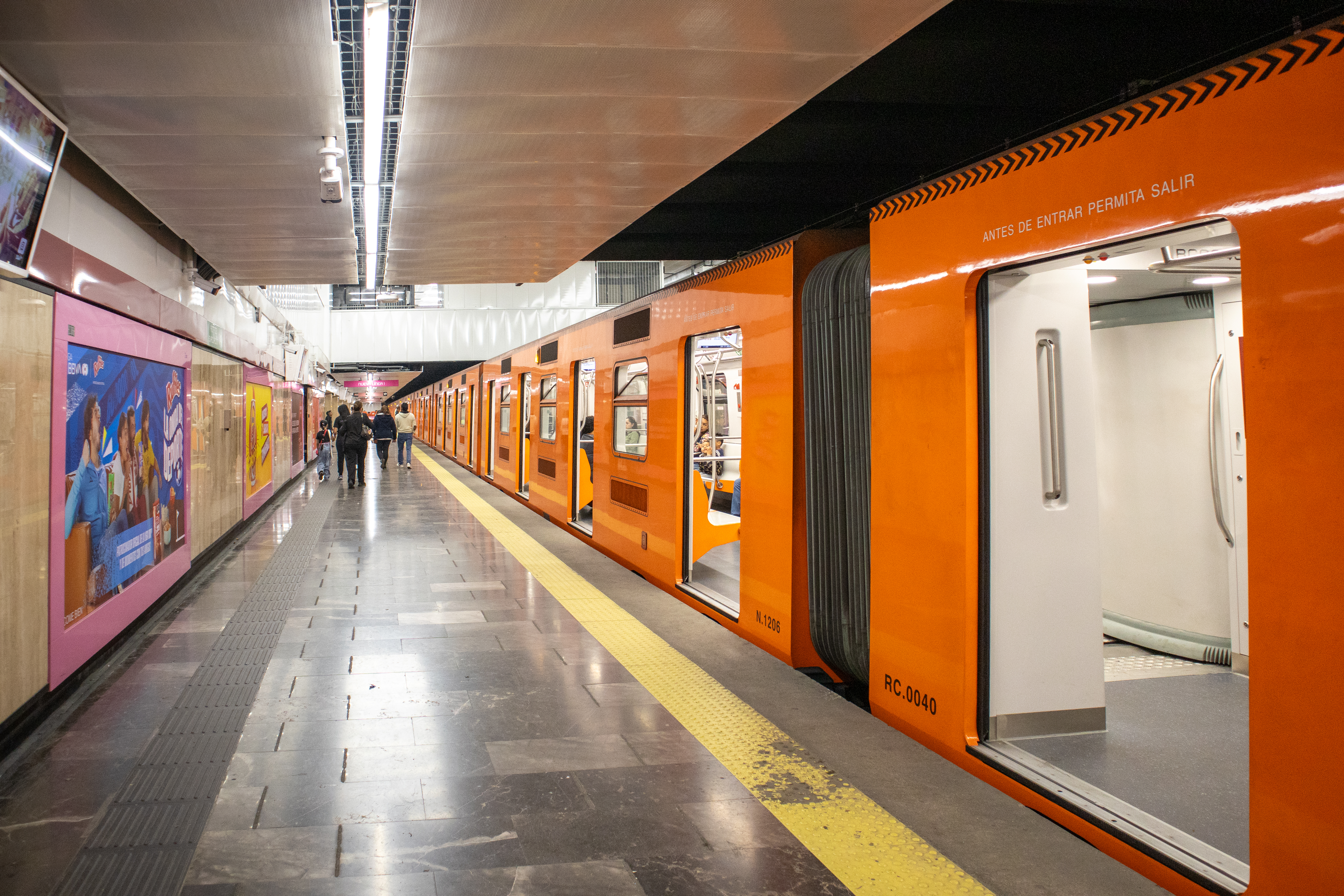
- Track view inside the Chapultepec station

General information
- Location: Avenida Chapultepec; Cuauhtémoc; Mexico City; Mexico
- Coordinates: 19.420783°N 99.176288°W
- System: Mexico City Metro
- Operator: Sistema de Transporte Colectivo (STC)
- Platforms: 2 side platforms
- Tracks: 2
- Connections: Chapultepec; Chapultepec stop (temporary)

Construction
- Structure type: Underground
- Depth: 15 m (49 ft)
- Platform levels: 1
- Parking: No
- Cycle facilities: Yes

Other information
- Status: In service

History
- Opened: 4 September 1969; 57 years ago

Passengers
- 2025: 10,165,138 (Note: The data here is limited to the most recent ten years to avoid excessive listings; earlier figures can be found in this page's history or on the Mexico City Metro website. To calculate the average daily ridership, the annual total is divided by 365 days (366 in leap years), with decimals omitted from the result. Each station per line is ranked individually, as the system counts transfer stations separately. The percentage change is calculated automatically using the data from the current year and the previous year.)
- Rank: 29/195

Services
| Preceding station | Mexico City Metro | Following station |
|---|---|---|
| Juanacatlán toward Observatorio | Line 1 | Sevilla toward Pantitlán |
Route map
Location
- Location within Mexico City
- Area map

Chapultepec is a station on the Mexico City Metro. It is located in the Cuauhtémoc borough in the center of Mexico City. In 2019, the station had an average ridership of 57,873 passengers per day, making it the 14th busiest station in the network. From November 2023 to April 2025, the station remained closed for modernization work on the tunnel and the line's technical equipment.

== General information ==
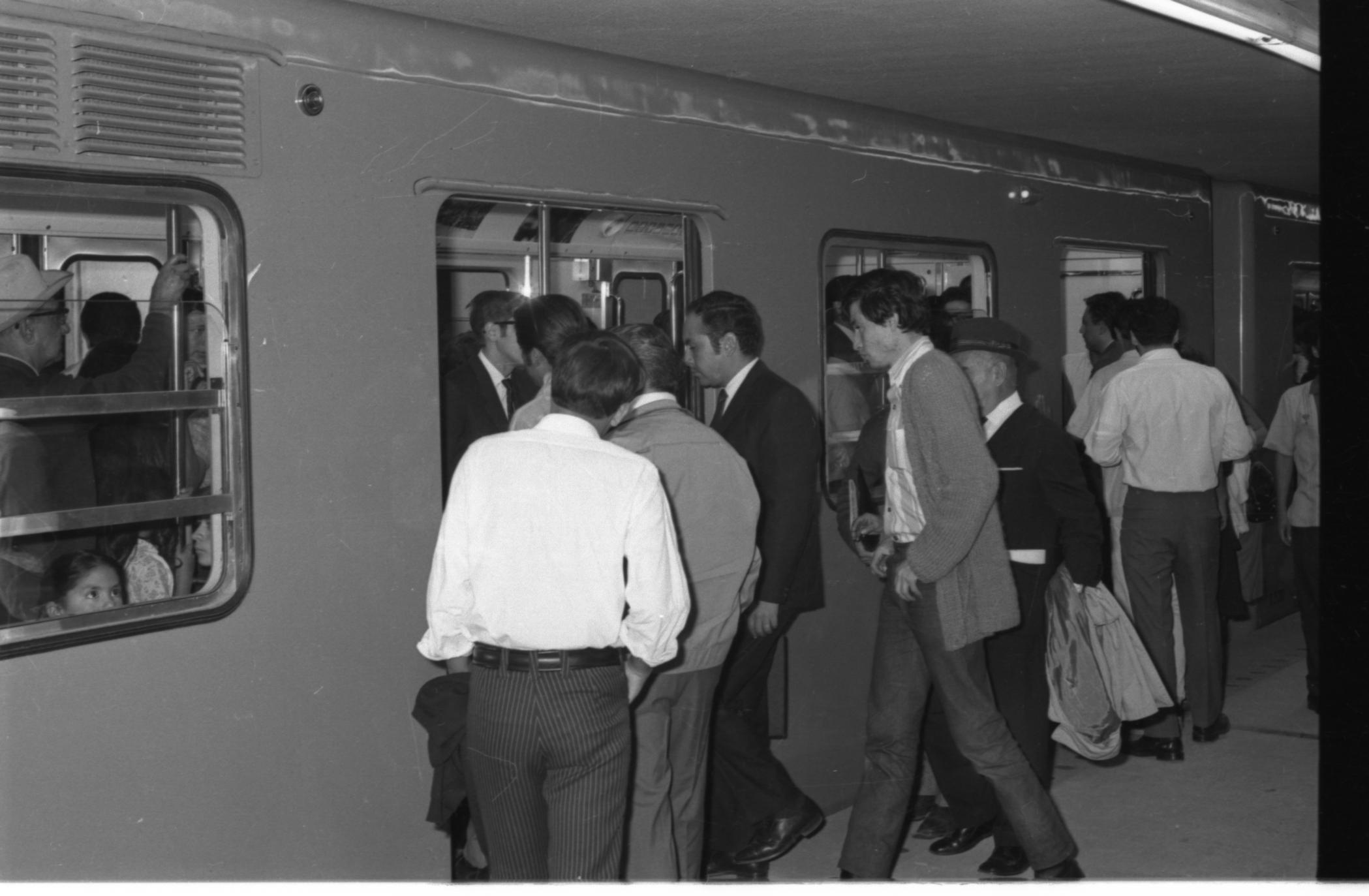
Passengers at the station during the first day of operations of the station, 5 September 1969.

The station logo depicts a grasshopper (chapulín). The station's name comes from the Bosque de Chapultepec, a large nearby park that contains a hill with the same name. Chapultepec means "grasshopper hill" in Nahuatl. The station was opened on 5 September 1969 with service eastward to Sevilla, when Chapultepec served as the western terminus of Line 1. Westward service from Chapultepec to Juanacatlán started on 11 April 1970.

Chapultepec lies along Line 1 only. Despite no longer being a terminal and not being a transfer station for other metro lines, the station plays an important role as a bus transfer station, connecting with a vast array of microbuses that service the north of Mexico City and areas in the adjacent State of Mexico, such as Ciudad Satélite, Valle Dorado, Arboledas and Cuautitlán Izcalli.

The station is also served by two trolleybus lines of the STE: One is L2 (formerly route S), which runs east from Chapultepec to Metro Velódromo along the arterial thoroughfares known as Eje 2 Sur and Eje 2A Sur and is one of two high-frequency trolleybus lines that STE calls "Zero-Emissions Corridors". The other is route I, which connects Chapultepec with Metro El Rosario, to the north.

Chapultepec has an information desk; the station forecourt also contains a collection of retail stores, including a clothes boutique, a drugstore and a record store.

The station serves the following neighborhoods: San Miguel Chapultepec, Colonia Juárez, Colonia Condesa and Colonia Roma Norte.

== Nearby ==
- Headquarters of the Secretariat of Health
- Headquarters of the Mexican Social Security Institute
- Torre Mayor, 225 metres tall skyscraper.
- Bosque de Chapultepec, the closest points of interest to the station are:
  - Museo de Arte Moderno, museum of modern art.
  - Chapultepec Castle
  - Heroic Cadets Memorial, monument dedicated to the memory of the Niños Héroes.
  - Chapultepec Zoo
- Estela de Luz, monument that commemorates the bicentenary of Mexico's independence.

== Exits ==
- East: Tampico street and Avenida Chapultepec, Colonia Roma Norte
- Northeast: Circuito Interior José Vasconcelos, Colonia Juárez
- West: Circuito Interior, San Miguel Chapultepec
- Northwest: Circuito Interior, Colonia Juárez
- North: Circuito Interior and Bosque de Chapultepec
- South: Circuito Interior José Vasconcelos, Colonia Condesa

== Ridership ==
Annual passenger ridership
| Year | Ridership | Average daily | Rank | % change | Ref. |
|---|---|---|---|---|---|
| 2025 | 10,165,138 | 27,849 | 29/195 | NA |
| 2024 | 0 | 0 | 189/195 | −100.00% |
| 2023 | 8,464,430 | 23,190 | 39/195 | −25.63% |
| 2022 | 11,382,161 | 31,184 | 18/195 | +25.20% |
| 2021 | 9,091,332 | 24,907 | 17/195 | −8.67% |
| 2020 | 9,954,625 | 27,198 | 18/195 | −48.66% |
| 2019 | 19,388,677 | 53,119 | 15/195 | +0.13% |
| 2018 | 19,363,646 | 53,051 | 14/195 | +0.42% |
| 2017 | 19,281,783 | 52,826 | 173/195 | −6.34% |
| 2016 | 20,586,480 | 56,247 | 14/195 | −4.70% |

== Gallery ==
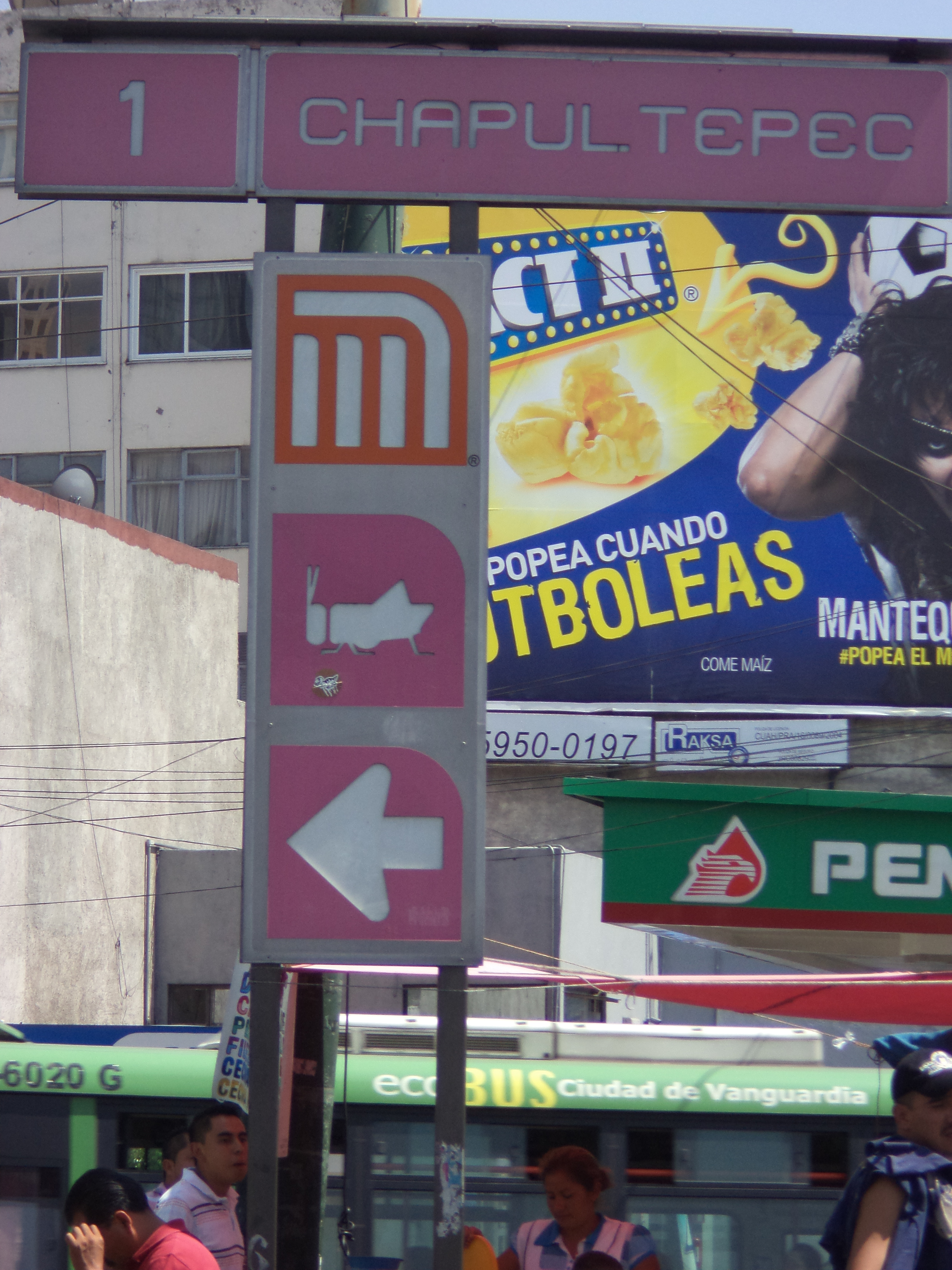
Entry sign to the station

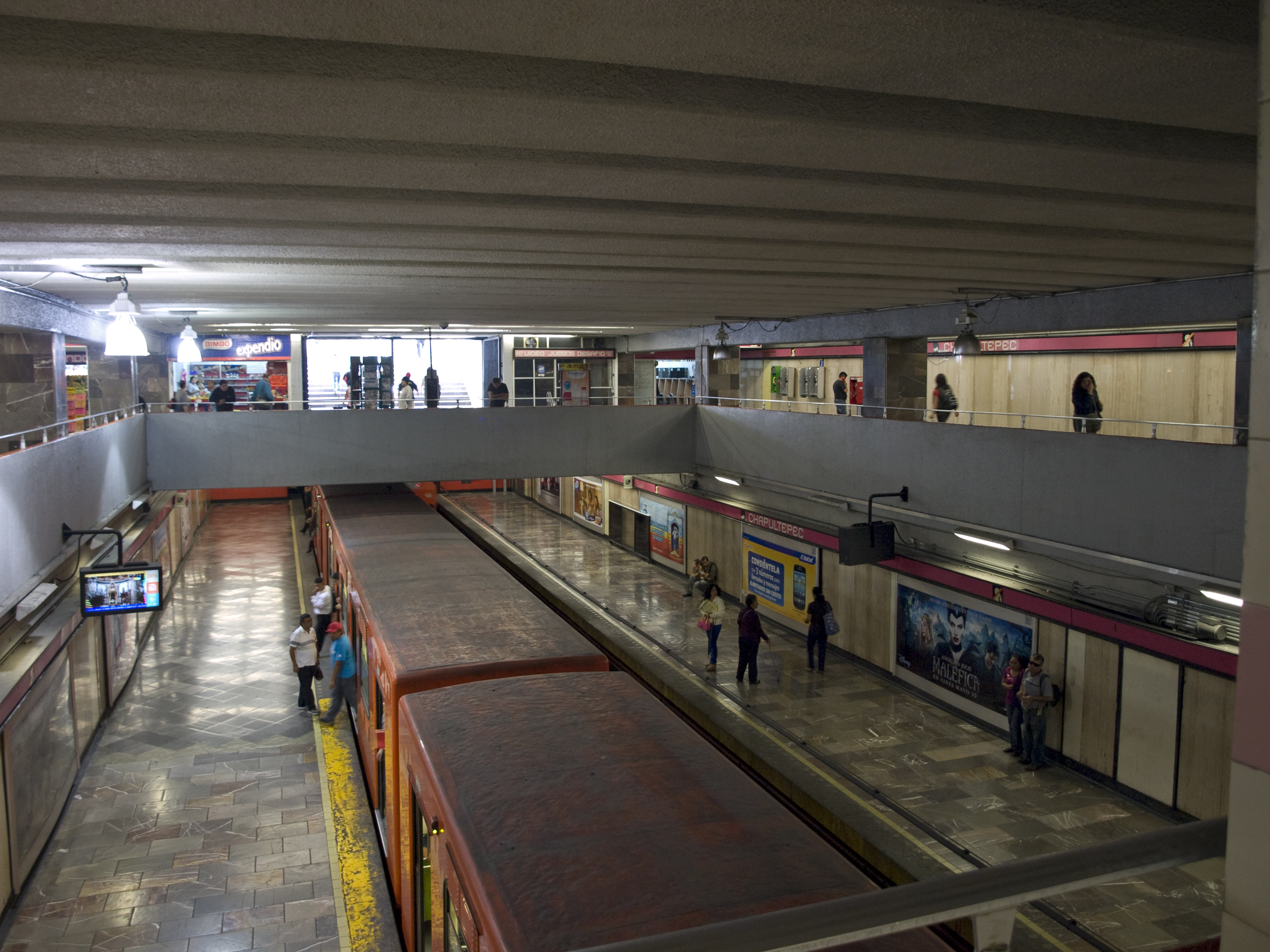
Station platforms
