= Mexico City Metro Line 1 =

Metro line in Mexico City

Line 1

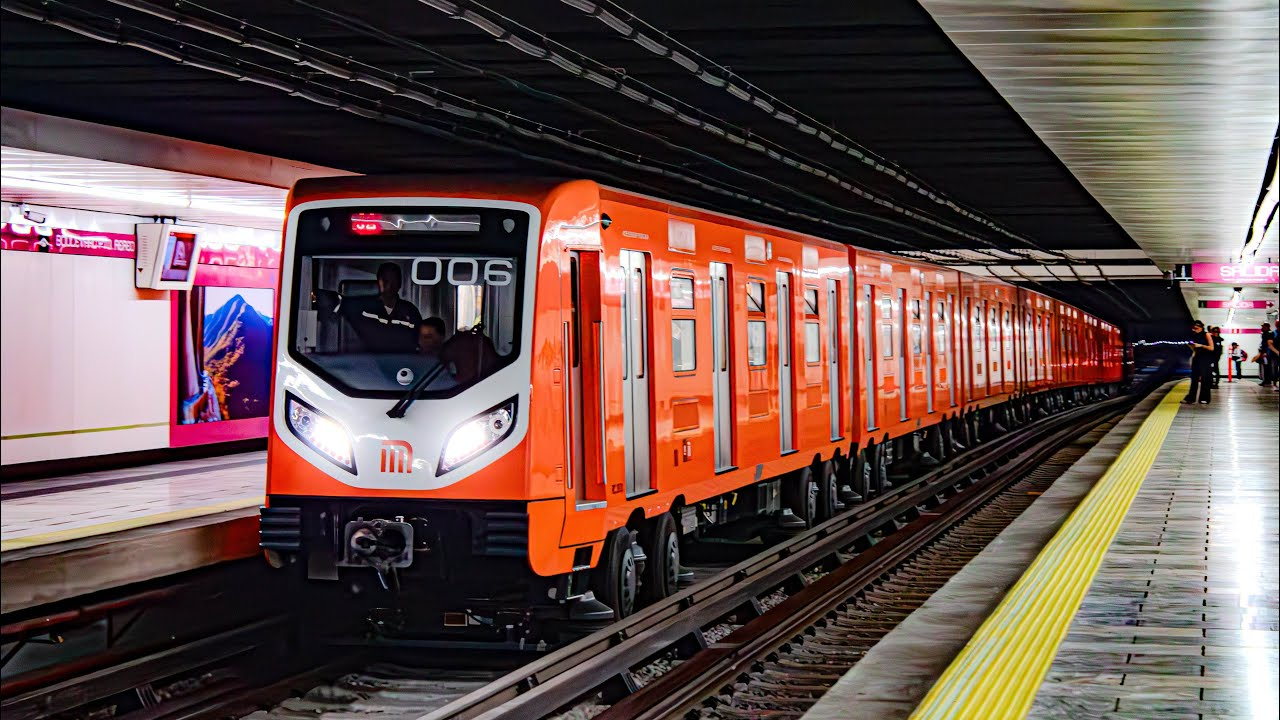
- NM-22 entering Boulevard Puerto Aéreo

Overview
- Locale: Mexico City
- Termini: Observatorio; Pantitlán
- Connecting lines: at Tacubaya; at Balderas; at Salto del Agua; at Pino Suárez; at Candelaria; at San Lázaro; at Pantitlán
- Stations: 20
- Website: metro.cdmx.gob.mx

Service
- Type: Rapid transit
- System: Mexico City Metro
- Operator: Sistema de Transporte Colectivo (STC)
- Rolling stock: NM-16, NM-22
- Ridership: 67,799,070 (2024)

History
- Opened: 4 September 1969; 56 years ago
- Last extension: 1984

Technical
- Line length: 16.654 km (10.3 mi)
- Track length: 18.828 km (11.7 mi)
- Number of tracks: 2
- Character: Underground and at-grade
- Track gauge: 1,435 mm (4 ft 8 1/2 in) standard gauge with roll ways along track
- Electrification: Guide bar, 750 V DC
- Operating speed: 80 km/h (50 mph) (max.); 36 km/h (22 mph) (avg.)
Route map
Line 1 route highlighted in gray

Mexico City Metro Line 1 is one of the twelve Metro lines operating in Mexico City, Mexico. Officially inaugurated in 1969, it was the first metro line to be built in the country. Its identifying color is pink, and it runs west–east.

The line is built under several avenues: Parque Lira, Pedro Antonio de los Santos, Circuito Interior, Avenida de los Insurgentes, Avenida Chapultepec, Arcos de Belén, Balderas, Eje Central Lázaro Cárdenas, José María Izazaga, Isabel la Católica, Anillo de Circunvalación, Congreso de la Unión, Eduardo Molina, and Ignacio Zaragoza.

It connects with Lines 7 and 9 at the Station Tacubaya, Line 3 at Balderas, Line 8 at Salto del Agua, Line 2 at Pino Suárez, Line 4 at Candelaria, Line B at San Lázaro and Lines 5, 9 and A at Pantitlán. When Line 12 extension is completed, it will also connect with Line 12 at Observatorio.

== History ==
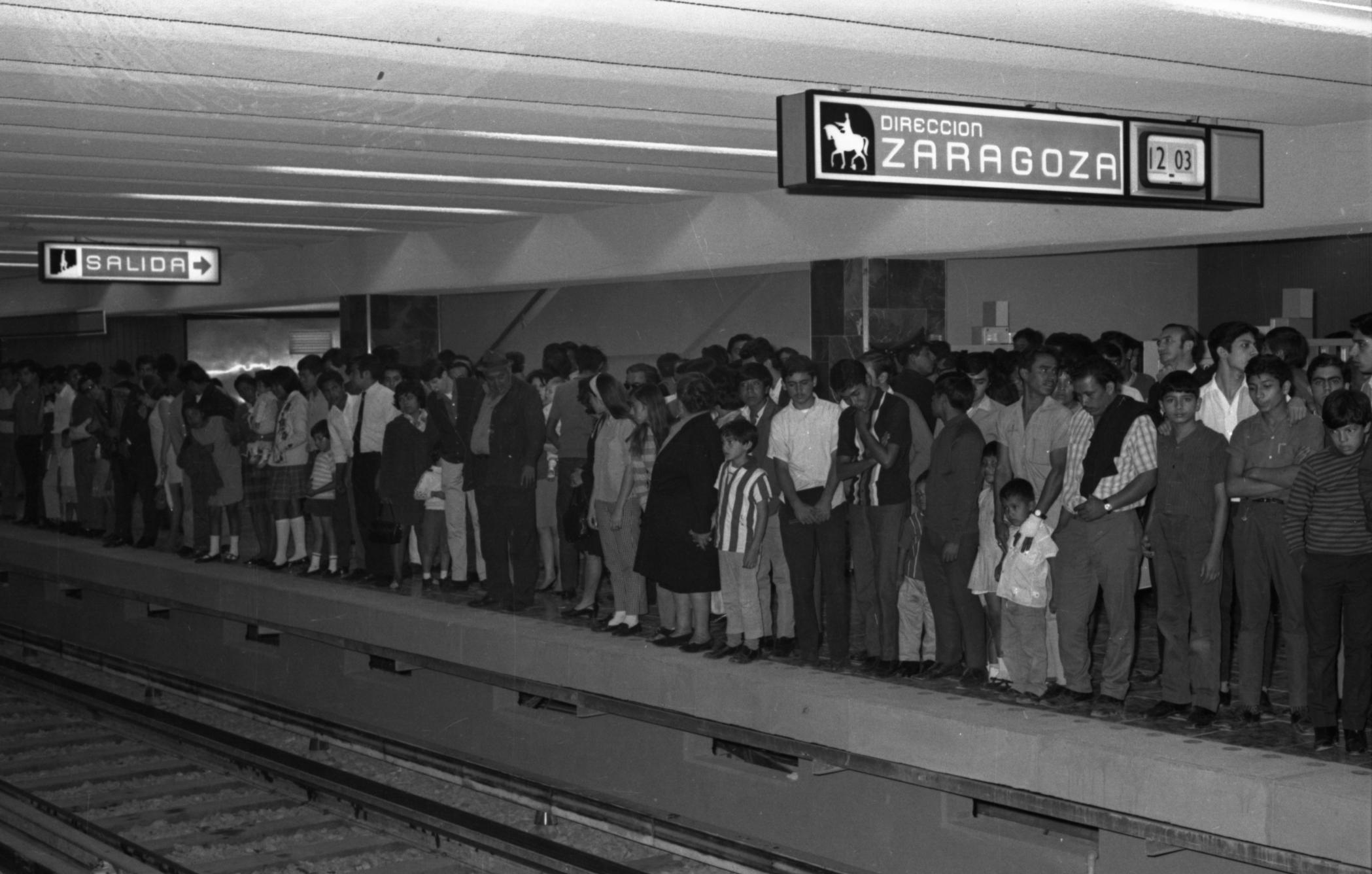
Chapultepec station during the first day of operations after the inauguration.

The first section of Line 1 was opened on 4 September 1969 as part of Mexico City Metro's first construction stage, it was inaugurated by Gustavo Díaz Ordaz, President of Mexico from 1964 to 1970, and Alfonso Corona del Rosal, Regent of the Federal District Department. The inauguration ceremony took place at the Insurgentes station.

The next day the line was opened to the public. To the original route (Chapultepec–Zaragoza) a new station, Juanacatlán, was added to the west on 11 April 1970, and the first correspondencia (a transfer station) became functional on 1 August 1970 when Line 2 was opened. The two westernmost stations Tacubaya and current terminal Observatorio were inaugurated on 20 November 1970 and 10 June 1972 respectively.

Station Pantitlán was opened on 22 August 1984 as the eastern terminal during a fourth and final expansion. All twenty stations have operated since then, running a total track length of 18.83 km (11.70 mi), of which 16.65 km (10.35 mi) are passenger track. The 1 is the only line in the network that is fully underground except for some surface track in Observatorio used for maintenance.

As of 2020, an extension of Line 12 is under construction, this stretch will connect Line 12 with Line 1 at the Observatorio station.

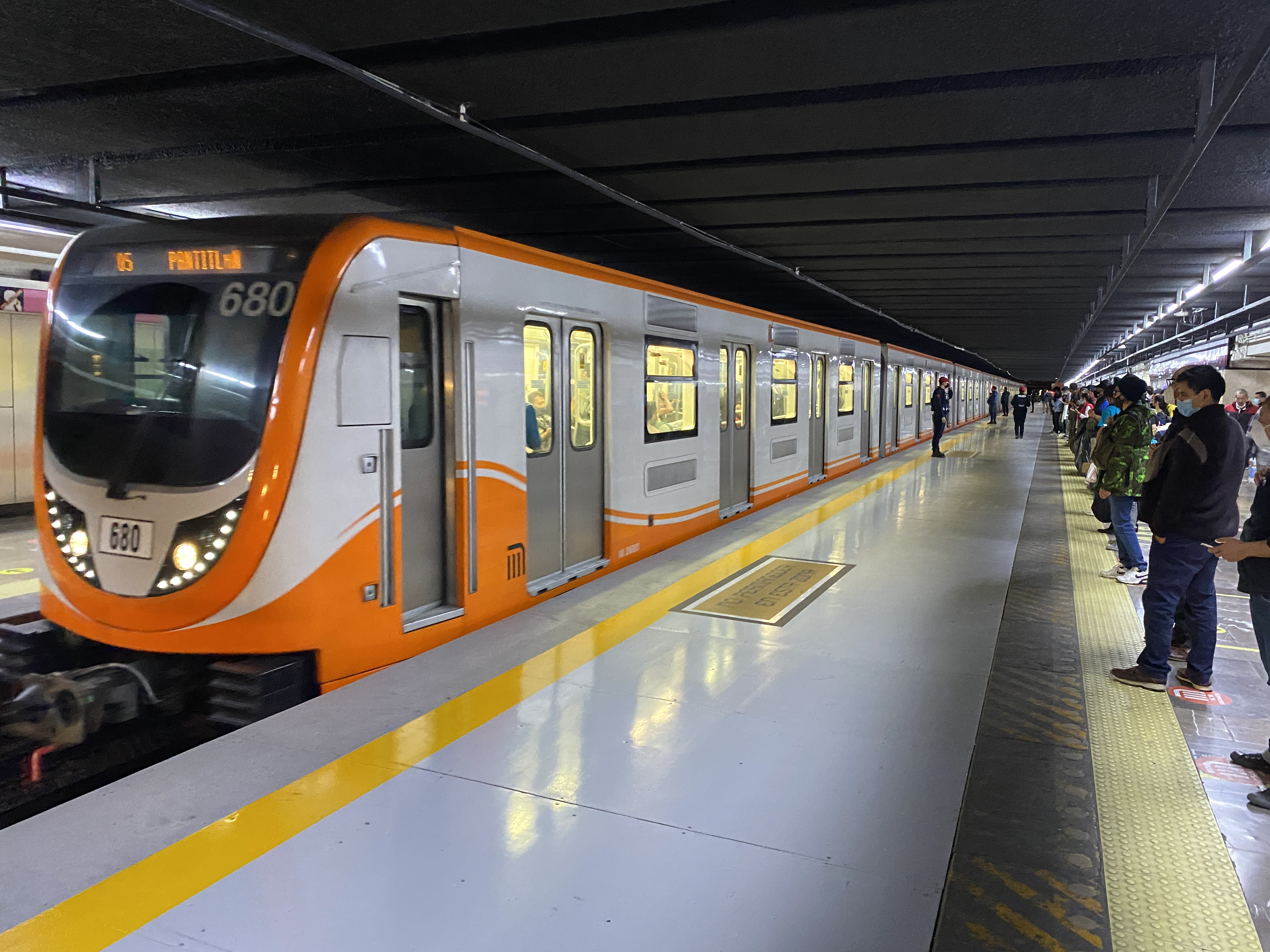
Temporary platform installed at Balderas station

Authorities warned on 10 August 2020 that Line 1 is in danger of a major fire due to an aging electrical system that is in need of major improvements. Lines 1, 2, and 3 report an average of 2.5 electrical failures daily. As a result, the line started undergo renovations that require its closure. The first closure was from Pantitlán to Salto de Agua stations, starting on 11 July 2022 with March 2023 being the expected completion date. The second closure was expected to start in March 2023 from Balderas to Observatorio stations and was expected to conclude in August 2023. During both periods, all railway elements will be replaced with modern material, the wiring will be replaced, damage due to leaks and cracks will be repaired, stations that are not yet modernized will be updated, and accessibility will be added to stations that lack it.

In April 2023, Siemens Mobility claimed that they would install CBTC on Line 1. On October 29, 2023, the modernized section of Line 1 was inaugurated. Salto del Agua and Balderas stations was reopened on September 13, 2024. The second stage is expected to begin on 9 November 2023.

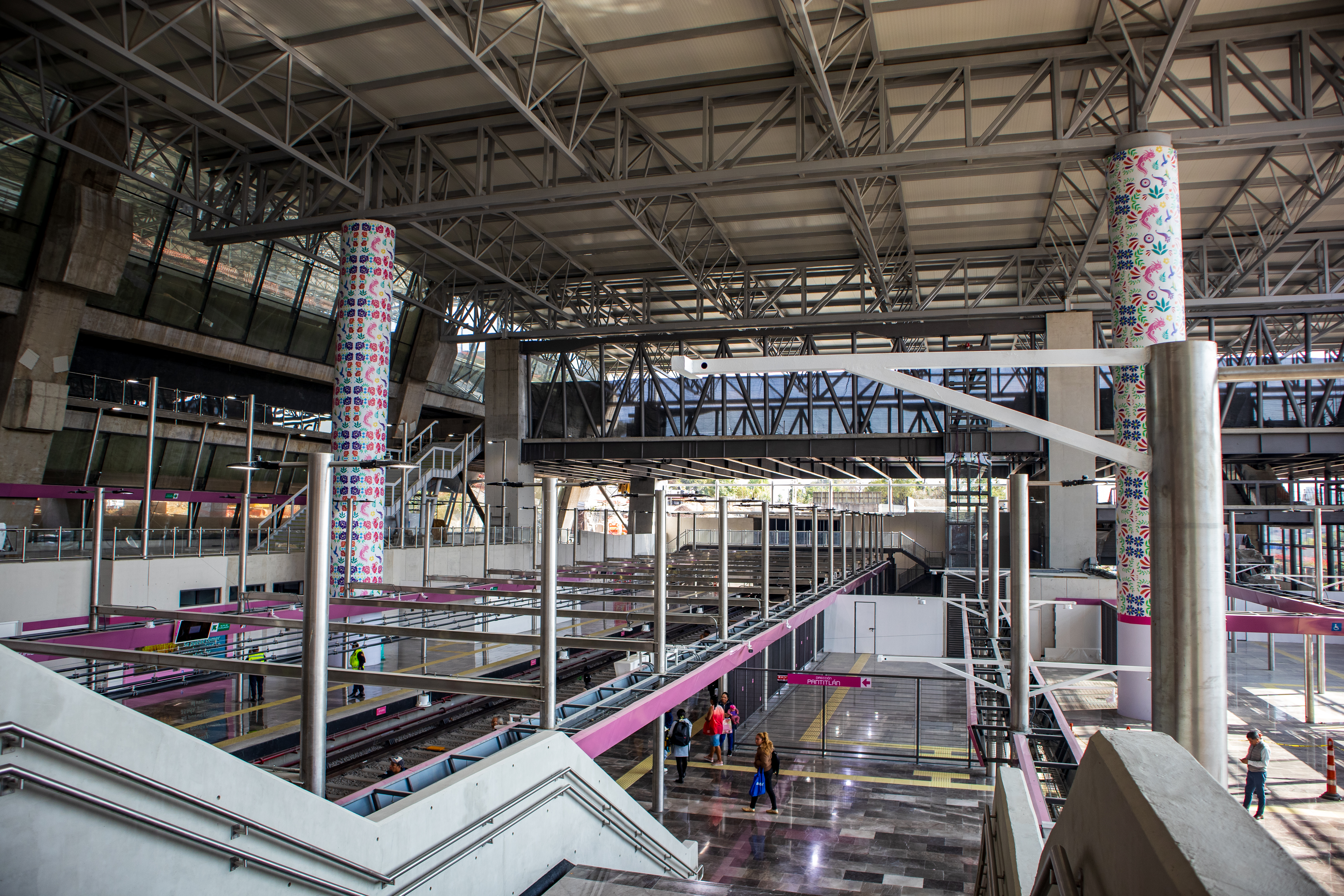
Renovated Observatorio station showing the connection to the El Insurgente train.

On November 16, 2025, the Observatorio - Chapultepec section of metro line 1 was reopened, thus completing its full modernization. The modernization, which included CBTC installation, is expected to increase capacity by 15%.

== Chronology ==
- September 4, 1969: from Chapultepec to Zaragoza.
- April 11, 1970: from Chapultepec to Juanacatlán.
- November 20, 1970: from Juanacatlán to Tacubaya.
- June 10, 1972: from Tacubaya to Observatorio.
- August 22, 1984: from Zaragoza to Pantitlán.

== Rolling stock ==
Line 1 has had different types of rolling stock throughout the years.

- Alstom MP-68, 1969–2018
- Concarril NM-73, 1978–2018
- Alstom MP-82, 1985–1994
- Concarril NM-83, 1989–2018
- CAF NE-92, 1994–2023
- Bombardier NC-82, 2006–2007
- Concarril NM-79, 2011–2012
- CAF NM-16, since 2019
- CRRC NM-22, since 2024

Currently, out of the 390 trains in the Mexico City Metro network, 49 are in service in Line 1.

== Station list ==
Key (Note: The following list was adapted from different websites and official maps.: Metro connections obtained from the official Mexico City Metro system map.; Accessibility obtained from the Mexico City Metro system map. In some cases, the map omits the accessibility icon as the station(s) are actually partially accessible. However, the respective websites of each station on the official site indicate the respective accessibility methods. Stations with the symbol ‡ are fully accessible; stations with the symbol † are partially accessible.; Cablebús obtained from their official website.; Centro de transferencia modal (CETRAM;) obtained from the official website of the Órgano Regulador de Transporte.; Ecobici obtained from their official website.; Metrobús obtained from the Mexico City Metrobús system map.; Mexibús obtained from the official Mexico City Metro system map.; Mexicable obtained from the official Mexico City Metro system map.; Public buses network (peseros) obtained from the official website of the Órgano Regulador de Transporte.; Red de Transporte de Pasajeros obtained from their official website.; Trolleybuses obtained from their official website.)
| Handicapped/disabled access | Fully accessible station | Cablebús Line {{{3}}} | Cablebús connection | Red de Transporte de Pasajeros | RTP connection |
| Handicapped/disabled access | Partially accessible station | Mexibús | Mexibús connection | Tren Interurbano | Tren Interurbano connection |
| Transfer hub | CETRAM transfer station | Mexicable | Mexicable connection | Tren Suburbano | Tren Suburbano connection |
| Transfer hub | ETRAM transfer station | Mexico City Metro | Mexico City Metro connection | Trolleybus | Trolleybus connection |
| Ecobici | Ecobici bikeshare | Mexico City minubus | Pesero connection | Xochimilco Light Rail | Xochimilco Light Rail connection |

The stations from east to west:

| Station | Handicapped/disabled access | Opened | Level | Distance (km) | | Connections | Location |
| Station | Handicapped/disabled access | Opened | Level | Between stations | Total | Connections | Location |
|---|---|---|---|---|---|---|---|
| Pantitlán | Handicapped/disabled access | August 22, 1984 | Underground | —N/a | 0.0 | 168; 11B, 11C, 19F, 19G | Venustiano Carranza |
| Zaragoza | Handicapped/disabled access | September 4, 1969 | Underground | 1.5 | 1.5 | 162B, 163, 163A, 163B, 164, 166, 167 | Venustiano Carranza |
| Gomez Farías | Handicapped/disabled access | September 4, 1969 | Underground | 0.9 | 2.4 | | Venustiano Carranza |
| Boulevard Puerto Aéreo | Handicapped/disabled access | September 4, 1969 | Underground | 0.7 | 3.1 | 43; 20B, 22D | Venustiano Carranza |
| Balbuena | Handicapped/disabled access | September 4, 1969 | Underground | 0.8 | 3.9 | Mexico City minubus | Venustiano Carranza |
| Moctezuma | Handicapped/disabled access | September 4, 1969 | Underground | 0.8 | 4.7 | | Venustiano Carranza |
| San Lázaro | Handicapped/disabled access | September 4, 1969 | Underground | 0.7 | 5.4 | East Bus Terminal | Venustiano Carranza |
| Candelaria | | September 4, 1969 | Underground | 1.1 | 6.4 | (at Cecilio Robelo); 37; 5A | Venustiano Carranza |
| Merced | Handicapped/disabled access | September 4, 1969 | Underground | 0.9 | 7.3 | 5A | Venustiano Carranza |
| Pino Suárez | Handicapped/disabled access | September 4, 1969 | Underground | 0.8 | 8.2 | 2A, 31B, 111A, 145A; 17C, 17H, 17I, 19E, 19F, 19G, 19H | Cuauhtémoc |
| Isabel la Católica | Handicapped/disabled access | September 4, 1969 | Underground | 0.5 | 8.7 | 19E, 19F, 19G, 19H | Cuauhtémoc |
| Salto del Agua | Handicapped/disabled access | September 4, 1969 | Underground | 0.6 | 9.3 | 19E, 19F, 19G, 19H | Cuauhtémoc |
| Balderas | Handicapped/disabled access | September 4, 1969 | Underground | 0.6 | 9.9 | 34A; 19E, 19F, 19G, 19H | Cuauhtémoc |
| Cuauhtémoc | Handicapped/disabled access | September 4, 1969 | Underground | 0.5 | 10.5 | 34A; 19E, 19F, 19G, 19H | Cuauhtémoc |
| Insurgentes | Handicapped/disabled access | September 4, 1969 | Underground | 0.9 | 11.4 | (at Glorieta de los Insurgentes); 34A; 19E, 19F, 19G, 19H | Cuauhtémoc |
| Sevilla | Handicapped/disabled access | September 4, 1969 | Underground | 0.8 | 12.2 | 19, 19A, 34A; 13D, 18C, 19E, 19F, 19G, 19H | Cuauhtémoc |
| Chapultepec | | September 4, 1969 | Underground | 0.6 | 12.9 | (at Chapultepec); 11A, 13A, 34A, 115A, 200; 7D, 8A, 8B, 8C, 8D, 13C, 13E, 18C, 18D, 19E, 19F, 19G, 19H, 21A | Cuauhtémoc |
| Juanacatlán | Handicapped/disabled access | April 11, 1970 | Underground | 1.1 | 14.0 | 13A, 115A; 21A | Miguel Hidalgo |
| Tacubaya | Handicapped/disabled access | November 20, 1970 | Underground | 1.3 | 15.2 | 110, 110B, 110C, 112, 113B, 115, 118, 119, 200; 1B, 9C, 9E, 21A | Miguel Hidalgo |
| Observatorio | Handicapped/disabled access | June 10, 1972 | Ground-level | 1.4 | 16.7 | (under construction); El Insurgente (at Observatorio); 21D; West Bus Terminal | Álvaro Obregón |

== Ridership ==
The following table shows each of Line 1 stations total and average daily ridership during 2019.

| † | Transfer station |
| ‡ | Terminal |
| †‡ | Transfer station and terminal |

| Rank | Station | Total ridership | Average daily |
|---|---|---|---|
| 1 | Observatorio‡ | 26,388,110 | 72,296 |
| 2 | Insurgentes | 20,753,676 | 56,859 |
| 3 | Chapultepec | 19,388,677 | 53,120 |
| 4 | Merced | 18,129,244 | 49,669 |
| 5 | Pantitlán†‡ | 17,860,457 | 48,933 |
| 6 | Zaragoza | 16,963,497 | 46,475 |
| 7 | Tacubaya† | 12,369,808 | 33,890 |
| 8 | San Lázaro† | 11,915,094 | 32,644 |
| 9 | Pino Suárez† | 11,456,022 | 31,386 |
| 10 | Sevilla | 11,123,527 | 30,475 |
| 11 | Gómez Farías | 10,360,851 | 28,386 |
| 12 | Candelaria† | 8,554,561 | 23,437 |
| 13 | Boulevard Puerto Aéreo | 8,429,972 | 23,096 |
| 14 | Cuauhtémoc | 8,311,511 | 22,771 |
| 15 | Isabel la Católica | 8,262,282 | 22,636 |
| 16 | Moctezuma | 8,050,035 | 22,055 |
| 17 | Balderas† | 7,825,656 | 21,440 |
| 18 | Salto del Agua† | 7,482,564 | 20,500 |
| 19 | Balbuena | 4,902,639 | 13,432 |
| 20 | Juanacatlán | 4,259,229 | 11,669 |
| Total | | 242,787,412 | 665,171 |

== Tourism ==
Line 1 passes near several places of interest.

- Bosque de Chapultepec, city park
  - Museo de Arte Moderno, museum of modern art
  - Chapultepec Castle
  - Heroic Cadets Memorial, a monument dedicated to the memory of the Niños Héroes
  - Chapultepec Zoo
- Estela de Luz, a monument that commemorates the bicentenary of Mexico's independence
- Paseo de la Reforma, emblematic avenue of Mexico City
- Diana the Huntress Fountain, a monumental fountain of Diana located at Paseo de la Reforma
- Angel of Independence, a victory column on a roundabout on the major thoroughfare of Paseo de la Reforma
- Zona Rosa, a neighborhood known for its shopping centers, nightlife, gay community, and Korean community
- Historic center of Mexico City

== See also ==
- List of Mexico City Metro lines
