= Observatorio metro station (Mexico City) =

Mexico City metro station

Observatorio
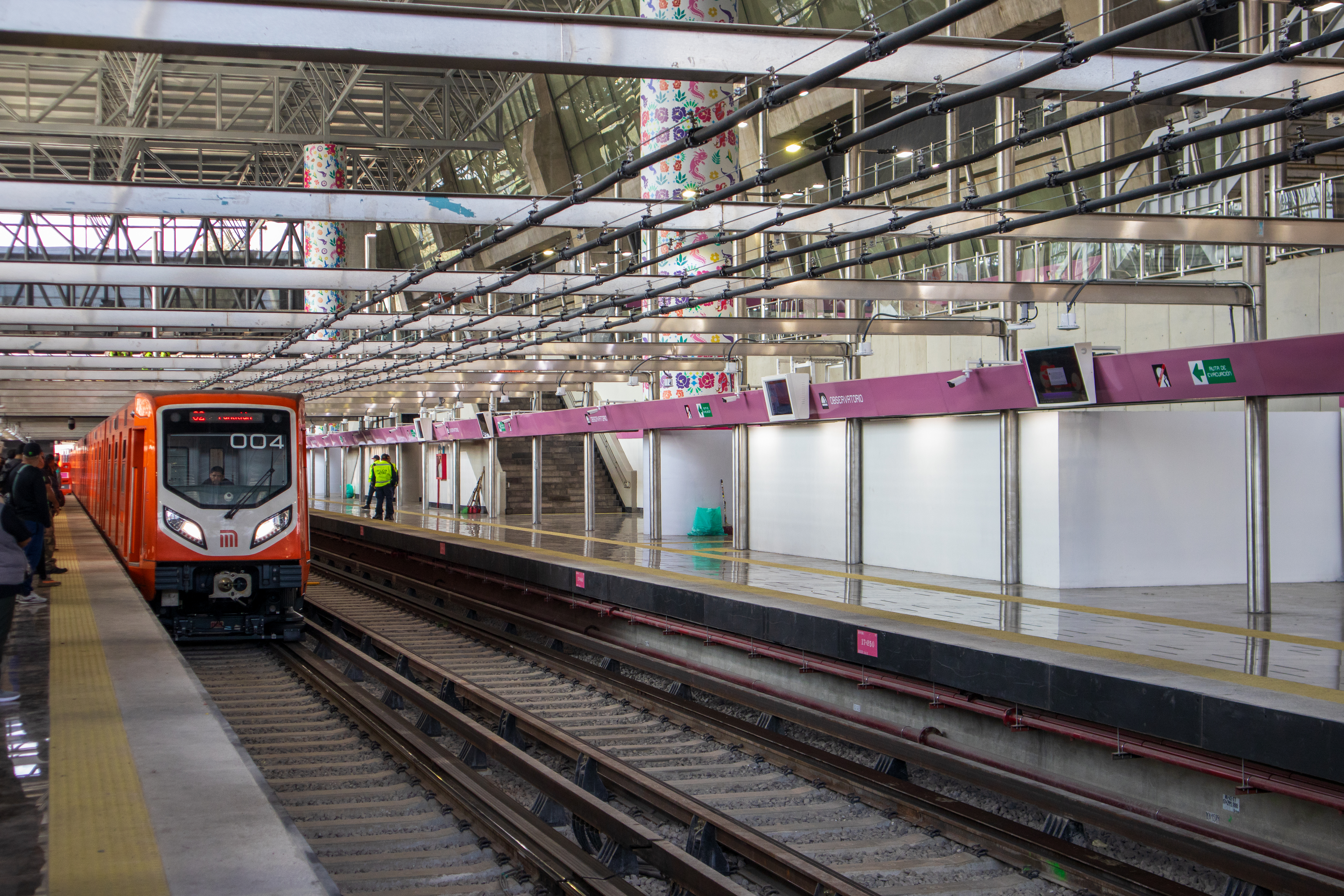
- Platforms at Observatorio station in 2025

General information
- Location: Calzada Minas de Arena; Álvaro Obregón, Mexico City; Mexico
- Coordinates: 19.398237°N 99.200363°W
- System: Mexico City Metro
- Operator: Sistema de Transporte Colectivo (STC)
- Platforms: 2 side platforms
- Tracks: 2
- Connections: Observatorio; Observatorio; West Bus Terminal

Construction
- Structure type: At grade Underground

Other information
- Status: In service Under construction

History
- Opened: 10 June 1972; 54 years ago Expected 2028–2030
- Rebuilt: 2023–2025; 1 year ago

Passengers
- 2025: 1,335,100 (Note: The data here is limited to the most recent ten years to avoid excessive listings; earlier figures can be found at Wikidata. To calculate the average daily ridership, the annual total is divided by 365 days (366 in leap years), with decimals omitted from the result. Each station per line is ranked individually, as the system counts transfer stations separately. The percentage change is calculated automatically using the data from the current year and the previous year.)
- Rank: 187/195

Services
Preceding station	Mexico City Metro	Following station
Terminus	Line 1	Tacubaya toward Pantitlán

Future services
Preceding station	Mexico City Metro	Following station
Terminus	Line 12	Álvaro Obregón toward Tláhuac
Route map
Location
- Location within Mexico City
- Area map

Observatorio is a metro station on Mexico City Metro Line 1. It is located in the Álvaro Obregón borough of Mexico City, west of the city centre. When operational it is the western terminus of Line 1. Before its shutdown for reconstruction, the station had an average ridership of 72,296 passengers per day, making it the eighth busiest station in the network.

The station will become the terminal station of Line 12. The station also connects with Observatorio railway station of the El Insurgente commuter rail system. In November 2023, Observatorio metro station was closed for modernization work on the tunnel and the line's technical equipment. The metro station was mostly demolished by December 2023, and it was reconstructed to facilitate the access between the Line 1, Line 12 and the El Insurgente stations.

== Name and iconography ==
The station logo represents the stylised dome of an astronomical observatory. It is named after Observatorio Astronómico Nacional, an observatory that was built by the Universidad Nacional Autónoma de México at the top of a hill near the station. However, due to the light pollution that came as a consequence of urban growth hardly any observations were done in the observatory, and thus it was transformed into a planetarium. Previously on the site was a colonial palace that belonged to the city's Bishop.

== General information ==
This station is one of the most important metro terminus in the city. It serves Mexico City's western bus depot, which connects with areas of western Mexico such as México state, Michoacán, Jalisco, Querétaro and others.

The Observatorio Mexico City Metro station is the 1st station of Line 1 and the Mexico City Metro system. Service at this station began on 10 June 1972. This Mexico City Metro train station is at ground level. The trains take passengers to Tacubaya, Juanacatlán, Chapultepec, Sevilla, Insurgentes, Cuáuhtemoc, Balderas, Salto del Agua, Isabel la Catolica, Pino Suárez, Merced, Candelaria, San Lazaro, Moctezuma, Balbuena, Boulevard Puerto Aéreo, Gómez Farías, Zaragoza, and Pantitlán Mexico City Metro stations.

Originally Line 9 had its plans to end here, even pictograms in Line 1 showed this station as a transfer station for Line 9. But for an unknown reason the station was not built and the Line 9 finished at Tacubaya.

In 2017, Toluca-Mexico City commuter rail started test trains and will enter full service by 2026.

On 2 February 2026, Observatorio opened as the eastern terminus of the El Insurgente commuter rail.

=== Ridership ===
Historical ridership since 2005.

Annual passenger ridership
Year	Ridership	Average daily	Rank	% change	Ref.
2025	1,335,100	3,657	187/195	NA
2024	0	0	189/195	−100.00%
2023	11,559,632	31,670	17/195	−11.47%
2022	13,057,993	35,775	14/195	+7.22%
2021	12,178,741	33,366	8/195	−8.73%
2020	13,343,431	36,457	9/195	−49.43%
2019	26,388,110	72,296	9/195	−2.16%
2018	26,970,170	73,890	9/195	+0.77%
2017	26,764,337	73,326	8/195	−3.49%
2016	27,732,577	75,772	8/195	+0.08%

== Future ==
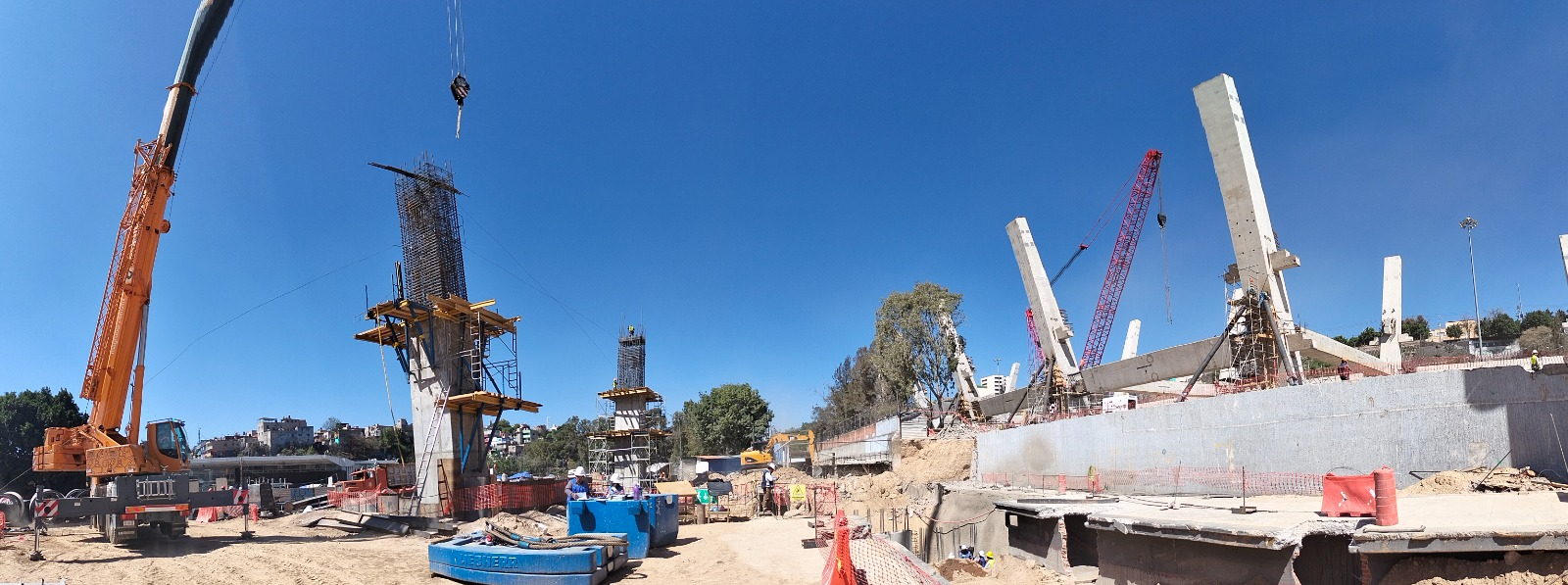
The station under reconstruction

As of March 2021, an extension of Line 12 to Observatorio is under construction, which will connect it with Line 1. The new Line 12 station is expected to open by 2021.

As of 2018, the connection from Line 9 Tacubaya station towards Observatorio is planned, but a completion date has not been announced. This would make Observatorio, together with Tacubaya, Chabacano and Pantitlán, the only transfer stations in the Mexico City Metro network to have connections with three lines, in this case Line 1, Line 9 and Line 12.

In October 2020, Mexico City's government announced a project to renovate the Observatorio area and to build a terminal that will allow users to transfer between metro, commuter rail and other public transportation services. It has been projected to be used by a million people every day and will be the most important complex of this type in Latin America. Works are expected to be finished by the end of 2026.

== Exits ==
- Northeast: Av. Minas de Arena, Col. Pino Suárez
- Northwest: Av. Minas de Arena, Col. Pino Suárez
- Southeast: Real del Monte street, Col. Pino Suárez
- Southwest: Real del Monte street, Col. Pino Suárez

== Gallery ==
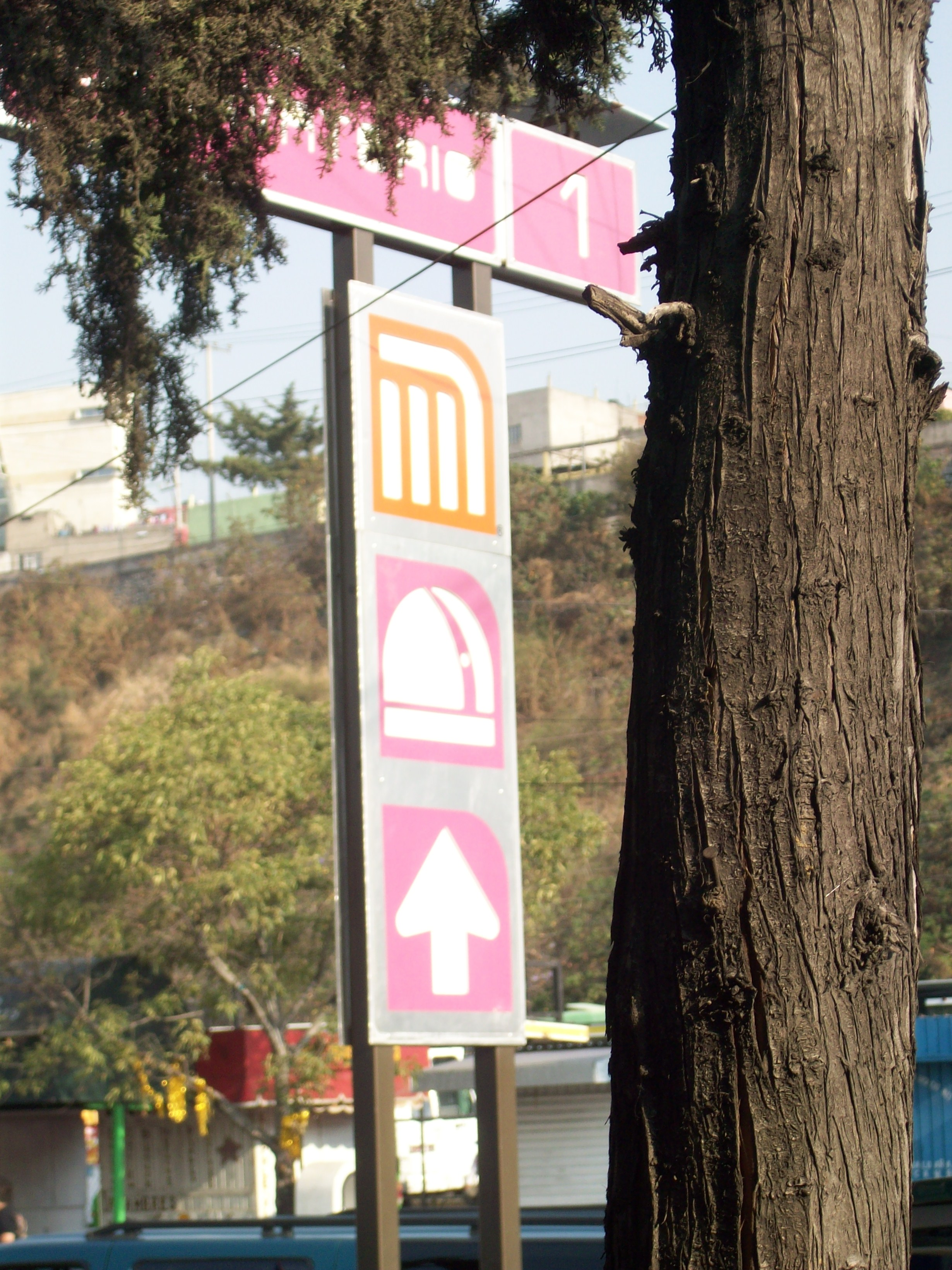
Entry sign for Metro Observatorio

== See also ==
- List of Mexico City metro stations
