= Unit Editions =

British book publishing company

- Founded: 2009; 17 years ago
- Founder: Adrian Shaughnessy, Tony Brook, Patricia Finegan
- Country of origin: United Kingdom
- Headquarters location: London
- Publication types: Books
- Nonfiction topics: Design
- Official website: uniteditions.com

Unit Editions is an independent British book publishing company founded in 2009 by Adrian Shaughnessy and Tony Brook and Patricia Finegan of the design studio Spin.

Based in London, the company is known for its elaborately produced publications that focus on niche topics in graphic design and visual culture. Its stated mission is to publish books on “subjects that are either neglected or ignored by mainstream publishers” and its founding was "prompted by frustration at the quality of design books available and a faith that quality in both design and writing would find a market".

Unit Editions was notable for establishing its reputation online and via social media and for producing a range of illustrated research papers (the first of which was on Ronald Clyne's work for the Folkways record label) as well as books.

The company distributes books directly to customers, selling about 85% of them through its website, and occasionally employing crowdfunding platforms like Kickstarter and Volume. Most of its books are produced in relatively small print runs of 1000–3000 copies, and some titles sell out quickly. The majority of its first 50 titles were designed by Spin.

In 2023, British publishing house Thames & Hudson acquired the rights to Unit Editions’ past publications and future titles. Since the acquisition, new books have been published on the work of designers MuirMcNeil, Chris Ashworth, North and Fred Troller with a second edition of its 2012 monograph on the late Ken Garland appearing in 2025.

== Awards and recognition ==
Eating with the eyes, a collection of photographs by designer and Pentagram partner Harry Pearce, designed by Pentagram and published by Unit Editions in 2016, won a 2016 D&AD Award. Unit Editions was nominated in the graphic design section of the 'Beazley Designs of the Year' exhibition at London's Design Museum in 2017 and included in Creative Review’s Creative Leaders list in 2018.

== Published titles ==
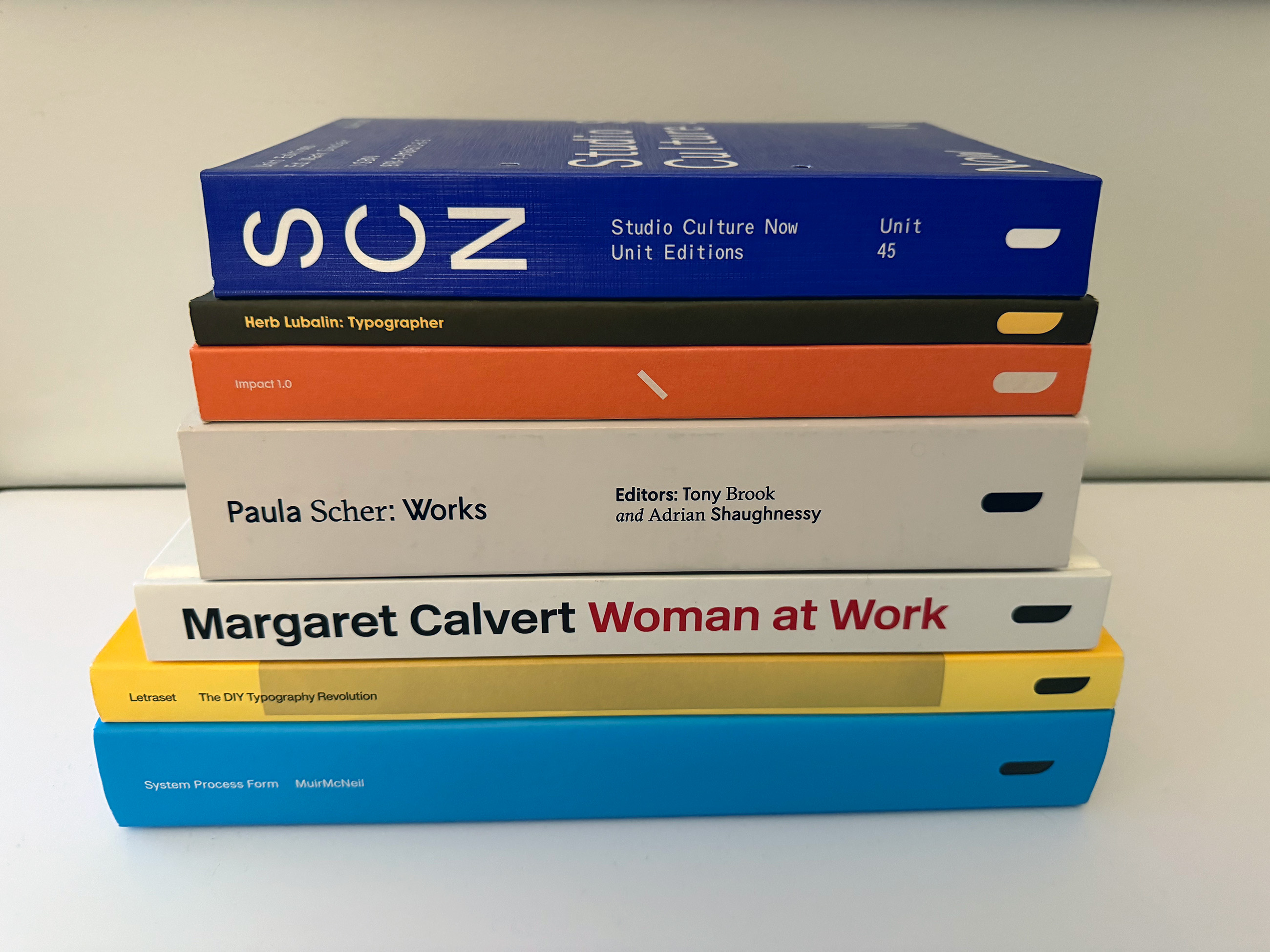
Selection of titles published by Unit Editions

As of 2025, Unit Editions’ imprint includes more than 50 published titles, including monographs on celebrated graphic designers like FHK Henrion, Lance Wyman, Pentagram, Ken Garland, Herb Lubalin, and Paula Scher. Each title published by Unit Editions is identified with a sequential number, usually placed on the book’s copyright page or covers.

Books published by Unit Editions
Unit	Title	Subject	Year	ISBN
1	Studio Culture: The Secret Life of the Graphic Design Studio	Interviews with graphic design studio owners	2009	ISBN 978-0-9562071-0-4
2	Supergraphics	Supergraphics	2010	
3	TD 63-73: Total Design and its Pioneering Role in Graphic Design	Work by Total Design	2011	
4	Wim Crouwel: a graphic odyssey catalogue	Catalogue to accompany Wim Crouwel exhibit at Design Museum	2011	ISBN 978-0-9562071-3-5
5	Projekt: The Polish Journal of Visual Art and Design	Projekt magazine	2011	ISBN 978-0-9562071-4-2
6	Kwadraat-Bladen – A Series of Graphic Experiments 1955-1974	Work by Pieter Brattinga	2012	ISBN 978-09562071-5-9
7	Herb Lubalin American Graphic Designer 1918–81	Work by Herb Lubalin	2012	ISBN 978-0-9562071-6-6
9	Ken Garland: Structure and Substance	Work by Ken Garland	2012	ISBN 978-0-9562071-9-7
10	Jurriaan Schrofer (1926-90): Restless Typographer	Work by Jurriaan Schrofer	2012	ISBN 978-0-9562071-8-0
11	Scratching The Surface: Essays 1995-2013	Essays by Adrian Shaughnessy	2013	ISBN 978-0-9575114-0-8
12	Type Only	Contemporary typography	2013	ISBN 978-0-9575114-1-5
13	FHK Henrion: The Complete Designer	Work by FHK Henrion	2013	ISBN 978-0-9575114-2-2
14	Herb Lubalin: American Graphic Designer 1918–81 (compact edition), re-issued	Work by Herb Lubalin	2014	ISBN 978-0-9575114-3-9
15	Manuals 1: Design and Identity Guidelines	Historic corporate design manuals	2014	ISBN 978-0-9575114-4-6
16	Supernew Supergraphics	Supergraphics	2014	ISBN 978-0-9575114-5-3
17	Type Plus	Contemporary typography	2014	ISBN 978-0-9575114-6-0
18	Manuals 2: Design and Identity Guidelines	Historic corporate design manuals	2014	
19	SPIN: 360º	Work by design studio Spin	2015	ISBN 978-0-9575114-8-4
20	Lance Wyman: The Monograph	Work by Lance Wyman	2015	ISBN 978-0-9575114-9-1
22	TD 63-73: Total Design and its Pioneering Role in Graphic Design, expanded	Work by Total Design	2016	ISBN 978-0-9932316-0-5
23	Eating with the eyes	Photographs by Harry Pearce	2016	ISBN 978-0-9932316-3-6
24	Graphic Stamps: The Miniature Beauty Of Postage Stamps	Postage stamps	2016	ISBN 978-0-9932316-4-3
25	Herb Lubalin: Typographer	Typography by Herb Lubalin	2016	ISBN 978-0-9932316-5-0
26	Action Time Vision – Punk & Post-Punk 7" Record Sleeves	Punk and post-punk record covers	2016	ISBN 978-0-9932316-6-7
27	Impact 1.0: Design Magazines, Journals and Periodicals (1922-1973)	Magazine covers, 1922–1973	2016	ISBN 978-0-9932316-8-1
28	Impact 2.0: Design Magazines, Journals and Periodicals (1974-2016)	Magazine covers, 1974–2016	2016	ISBN 978-0-9932316-9-8
30	Paula Scher: Works	Work by Paula Scher	2016	ISBN 978-0-9956664-1-2
31	Spin/Adventures in Typography	Experimental work by design studio Spin	2017	
32	andreas uebele material monograph volume 3, 2003–2016	Work by Andreas Uebele	2016	ISBN 978-0-9956664-2-9
33	National Theatre Posters: A Design History	Posters for National Theatre	2017	ISBN 978-0-9956664-3-6
34	Letraset: The DIY Typography Revolution	Typefaces and history of Letraset	2017	ISBN 978-0-9956664-4-3
35	Octavo Redux 1:1 — a record of Octavo, journal of typography 1986–1992	Work by design studio 8vo	2017	ISBN 978-0-9956664-5-0
36	Spin/Adventures in Typography II	Experimental work by design studio Spin	2017	ISBN 978-0-9956664-6-7
37	Paula Scher: Works (concise edition), re-issued	Work by Paula Scher	2018	ISBN 978-0-9956664-7-4
38	Vaughan Oliver: Archive Materials & Fragments	Work by Vaughan Oliver	2018	
40	VNIITE: Discovering Utopia – Lost Archives of Soviet Design	Work by VNIITE	2018	ISBN 978-1-9164573-0-0
41	Lance Wyman: Process. A proposal for the 1976 USA Bicentennial identity	Brand identity for the United States Bicentennial	2018	ISBN 978-1-9164573-1-7
42	Karlssonwilker On America	Visual essay on America by design studio Karlssonwilker	2018	ISBN 978-1-9164573-2-4
43	What is Universal Everything?	Work by Universal Everything	2019	ISBN 978-1-9164573-3-1
44	AZTDR™ – A—Z of The Designers Republic™	Work by The Designers Republic	2019	ISBN 978-1-9164573-4-8
45	Studio Culture Now: Advice and guidance for designers in a changing world	Interviews with graphic design studio owners	2020	ISBN 978-1-9164573-6-2
46	Ed Fella: A Life in Images	Work by Ed Fella	2022	ISBN 978-1-9164573-7-9
50	Pentagram: Living by Design	Work by Pentagram	2022	ISBN 978-1-9164573-8-6
52	North: Extracts from visual identities	Work by design studio North	2023	ISBN 978-0-5008802-2-7
53	1,000 Marks	Logotypes by Pentagram	2024	
54	Disorder: Swiss Grit Volume II	Work by Chris Ashworth	2025	
55	Fred Troller Design	Work by Fred Troller	2024	ISBN 978-0-500-88039-5
56	Ken Garland: Structure and Substance, re-issued	Work by Ken Garland	2025	
