= Lance Wyman =

American graphic designer

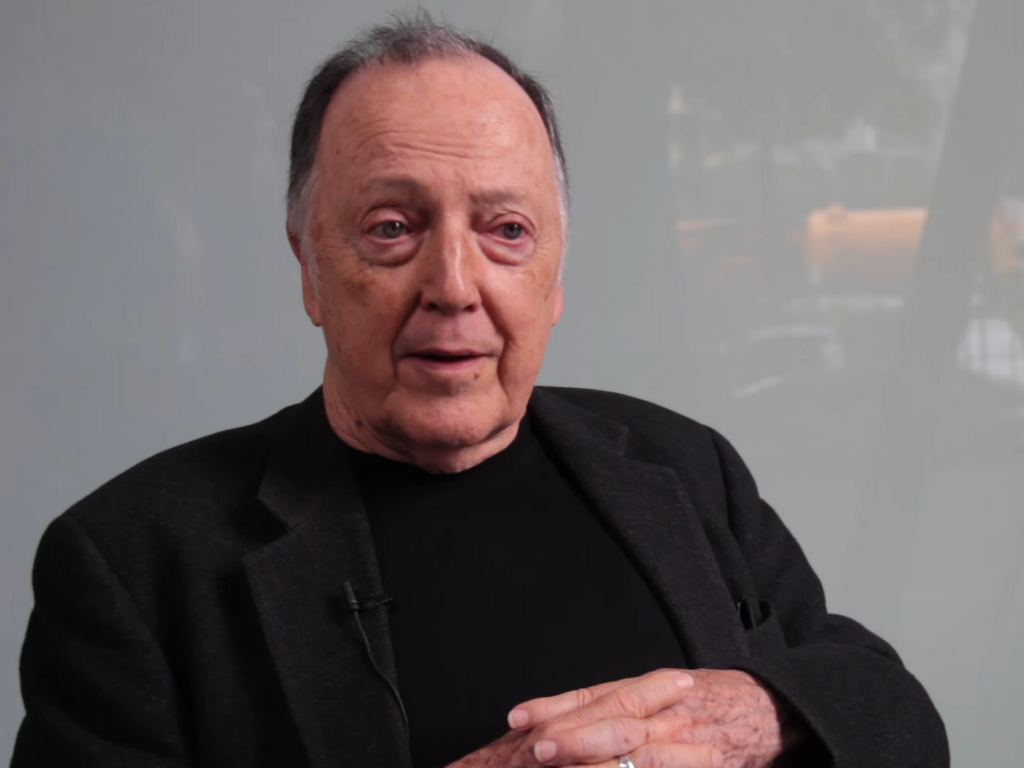
- Born: 1937 (age 88–89); Newark, New Jersey, United States
- Occupation: Graphic designer

Lance Wyman (born 1937) is an American graphic designer. He is known for his work under Mexican architect Pedro Ramírez Vázquez, doing design concept and direction in developing applications of the logo for the 1968 Summer Olympics in Mexico City.

== Life and career ==
Wyman, the son of a commercial fisherman and a typist, grew up in Kearny, New Jersey, where he worked in the factories during summers to pay for college. He acquired an appreciation for the "no-nonsense functional aesthetic of the sea and the factories", which he has described as "an important influence in my approach to design." He graduated from the Pratt Institute with a degree in industrial design in 1960. The subject of graphic design was just being introduced in American universities at the time; when Wyman met a student who studied logo design with Paul Rand at Yale, he wanted to design logos.

Wyman began his career at General Motors in Detroit, Michigan, where he worked on a packaging system for Delco automotive parts that unified 1,200 different packages. Later, he moved to the office of William Schmidt, where he produced the graphics for the U.S. pavilion at a 1962 trade fair in Zagreb, Yugoslavia.

In 1963, Wyman moved to New York, where he joined the George Nelson firm. He designed the graphics for the Chrysler Pavilion at the New York World's Fair. He later reported that devising a "pointing hand" themed logo and adapting it to the site directional signs convinced him that logos could play a more important role in an overall design program. In December 1966, he traveled to Mexico City to work at Pedro Ramírez Vázquez's office, and worked with many other designers in the identity program of the 1968 Summer Olympic Games. Wyman stopped working for the organizing committee in October 1968, he then designed the graphics programs for the Mexico City Metro.

After returning to New York, Wyman formed a partnership with Bill Cannan (Wyman & Cannan). In 1979, he established his own firm, Lance Wyman Ltd. He has also taught corporate and wayfinding design at Parsons School of Design since 1973.

== Work ==
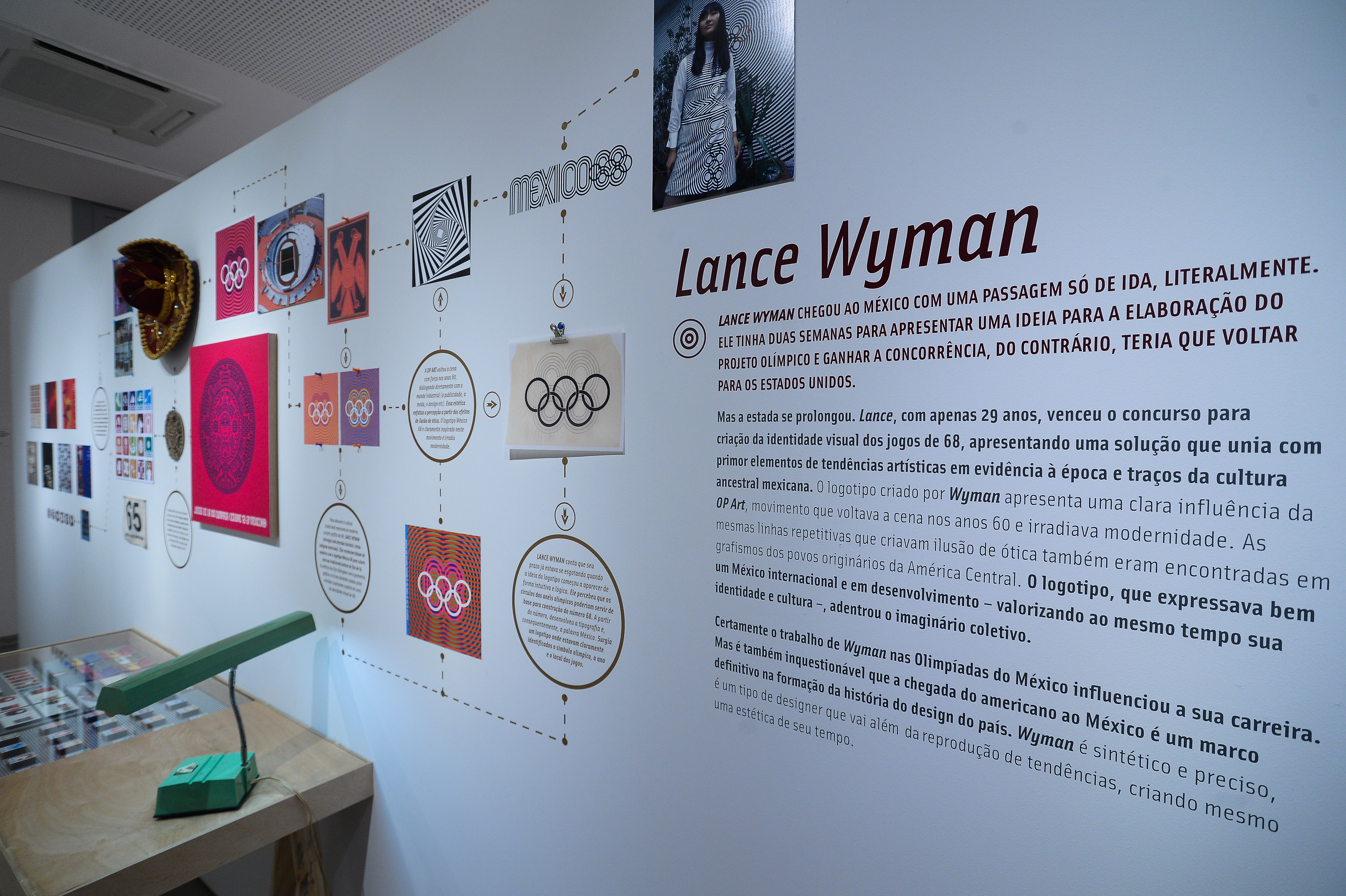
Exhibit featuring Wyman's work in Rio de Janeiro (2016)

Wyman, who has been described as a "rock star" of graphic arts, made his reputation when he collaborated with Eduardo Terrazas, under the direction of architect Pedro Ramírez Vázquez, in the development of the entire design campaign for the Mexico 1968 Summer Olympic Games. He has also designed icons for museums and many other institutions, individualized signs for buildings at the National Zoo in Washington D.C., and many other symbols. Stepping outside his usual genre, he designed a poster for the 2008 Barack Obama presidential campaign.

Perhaps his most enduring design is the stylized route map he devised for the Washington Metro in the mid-1970s, prioritizing the clear representation of routes, stations, transfer points, and certain landmarks over showing distances to scale. In 2011, Wyman was called on to design a new Metro map depicting new lines and route orientations, as well as some station names that had been expanded to the point of being cumbersome. It was one of the few occasions in which the original designer has had a chance to revise his own creation. The new map debuted March 19, 2012, and an update was announced on September 12, 2013. Wyman suggested naming the then-under-construction Metro line the Cherry Blossom Line, but it became the Silver Line instead.

Wyman's work was the subject of a retrospective exhibition called "Urban Icons" at El Museo Universitario Arte Contemporáneo (MUAC) in Mexico City (2014–15). In 2016 the Japanese design magazine Idea published a 24-page feature on his graphics for the 1968 Summer Olympics (issue No. 374). The text was written by Adrian Shaughnessy. In 2017, he was awarded the AIGA Medal for his "mastery of visual ecosystems and for setting the standard for the universal, public design experience."
