= Valentín Campa metro station =

Mexico City metro station

Valentín Campa

General information
- Location: Alta Tensión Avenue and Prolongación San Antonio; Álvaro Obregón, Mexico City; Mexico
- Coordinates: 19°22′56″N 99°12′00″W
- System: Mexico City Metro
- Platforms: 2 side platforms
- Tracks: 2

Construction
- Structure type: Underground
- Accessible: Yes

Other information
- Status: Under construction

History
- Opening: Expected 2028–2030

Services
| Preceding station | Mexico City Metro | Following station |
|---|---|---|
| Álvaro Obregón toward Observatorio | Line 12 | Mixcoac toward Tláhuac |
Route map
Location
- Location within Mexico City
- Area map

Valentín Campa is a future station of the Mexico City Metro in the borough of Álvaro Obregón, Mexico City. It will be an underground station with two side platforms, served by Line 12 (the Golden Line), between Álvaro Obregón and Mixcoac stations. It will serve the colonias of Carola and Francisco Villa.

The station will be named after Valentín Campa, a railway union leader. The expansion of Line 12 was approved in March 2013 and started in April 2016, and the station was expected to open in December 2023. The station was formerly known as Benvenuto Cellini and Alta Tensión. Like the rest of the line, Valentín Campa station will be accessible.
