= Chris Ashworth (artist) =

English graphic designer

Chris Ashworth is an English graphic designer known for being the global creative director for Getty Images, Nokia, and Microsoft, and the art director of the magazine Ray Gun in 1997. In addition to his work on Ray Gun, Ashworth also created the brochure and promotional materials for the first MTV Europe Music Awards in collaboration with John Warwicker and Simon Taylor. His work on the brochures earned him more work with MTV, as well as work with Warner Music Group and Image Bank.

Ashworth graduated from the York College of Arts & Technology in 1990 with a degree in graphic design. In collaboration with some friends, he opened a design studio called Orange, which created black and white, easily photocopiable flyers for local nightclubs.

Ashworth is inspired by Swiss design aesthetics, and refers to his own style as "Swiss grit". This style is characterized by hyper detail, barcodes, horizontal lines, and the use of multiple transparent layers. A major monograph on Ashworth's work titled Disorder: Swiss Grit Volume II was published in 2025 by Unit Editions and Thames & Hudson. Volumes I and III are forthcoming.

== Published works ==
- Eyes Only with John Holden: ISBN 0952364050, published by Umran Projects, January 1, 1999
- Soon: Brands of Tomorrow with Lewis Blackwell: ISBN 0970877919, published by fivedegreesbelowzero press, February 2002
- Disorder: Swiss Grit Volume II, published by Unit Editions and Thames & Hudson, 2025
