= Cinerama Holiday =

1955 film by Philippe De Lacy

- Directed by: Robert L. Bendick; Philippe De Lacy
- Starring: Fred Troller; Beatrice Troller; John Marsh; Betty Marsh
- Cinematography: Joseph C. Brun; Harry Squire
- Edited by: Jack McCay; Fredrick Y. Smith; Les Zackling
- Music by: Morton Gould with additional music by Jack Shaindlin and Nathan Van Cleave
- Distributed by: Cinerama Releasing Corporation
- Release date: February 8, 1955
- Running time: 119 minutes
- Country: United States
- Language: English
- Budget: $1.5 million
- Box office: $29.6 million

Cinerama Holiday is a 1955 film shot in Cinerama. Structured as a criss-cross travel documentary, it shows an American couple (John and Betty Marsh) traveling in Europe and a Swiss couple (Fred Troller and Beatrice Troller) traveling in the United States. Like all of the original Cinerama productions, the emphasis is on spectacle and scenery. The European sequences include a point-of-view bobsled ride, while the U.S. sequences include a point-of-view landing on an aircraft carrier.

== Places ==
Places visited include Davos, Paris, New Orleans & an early Las Vegas.

== Reception ==
The film earned $10 million in domestic rentals (equivalent to $120,186,335 in 2025) and became the highest-grossing film of 1955 in the United States, surpassing other motion pictures such as Mister Roberts, Battle Cry and Oklahoma!.

Largely unseen for decades, the film was released on Blu-ray in 2013, restored and remastered from the original camera negatives.
