= Mexico City Metro =

Rapid transit system in Mexico City

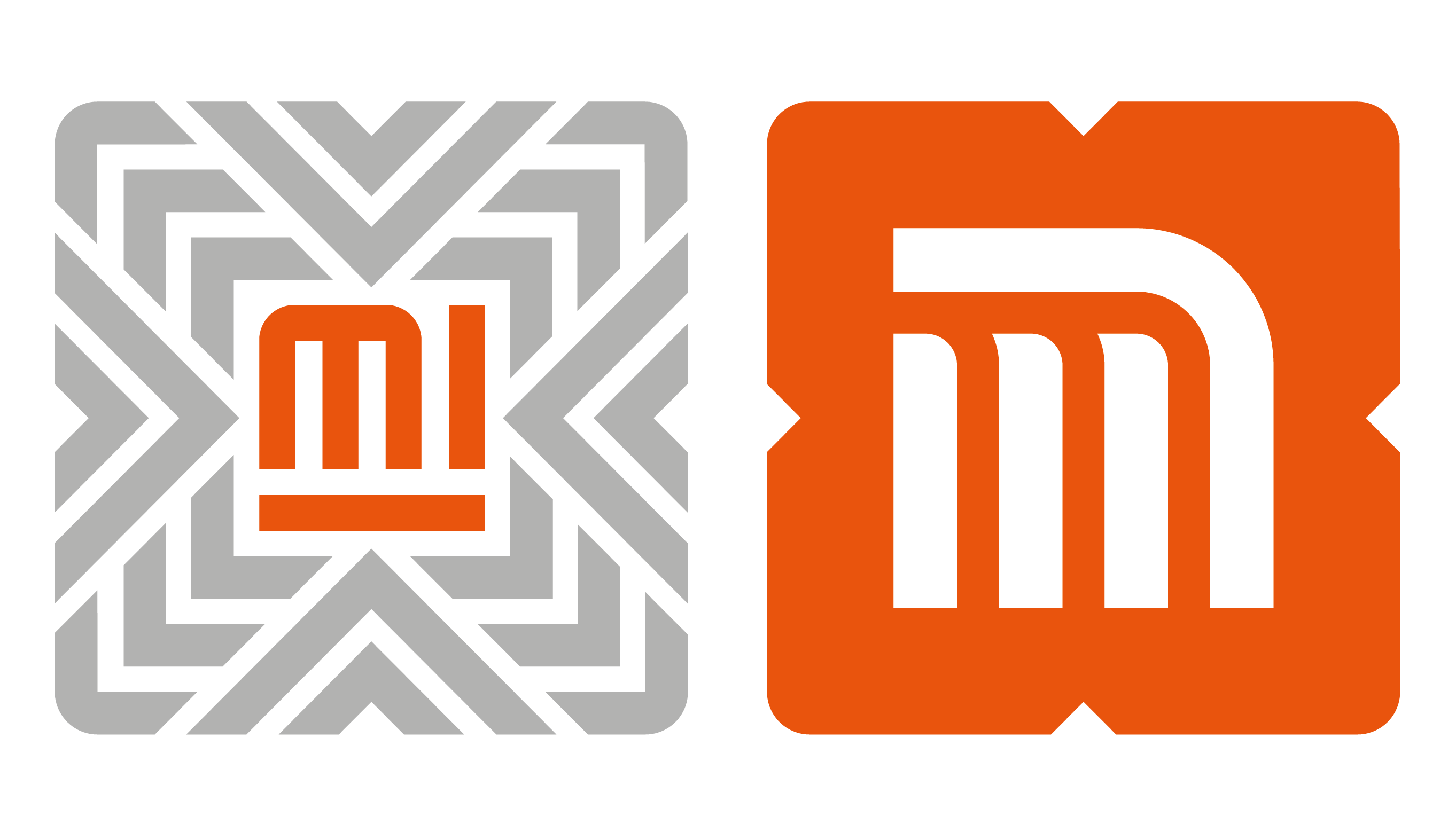

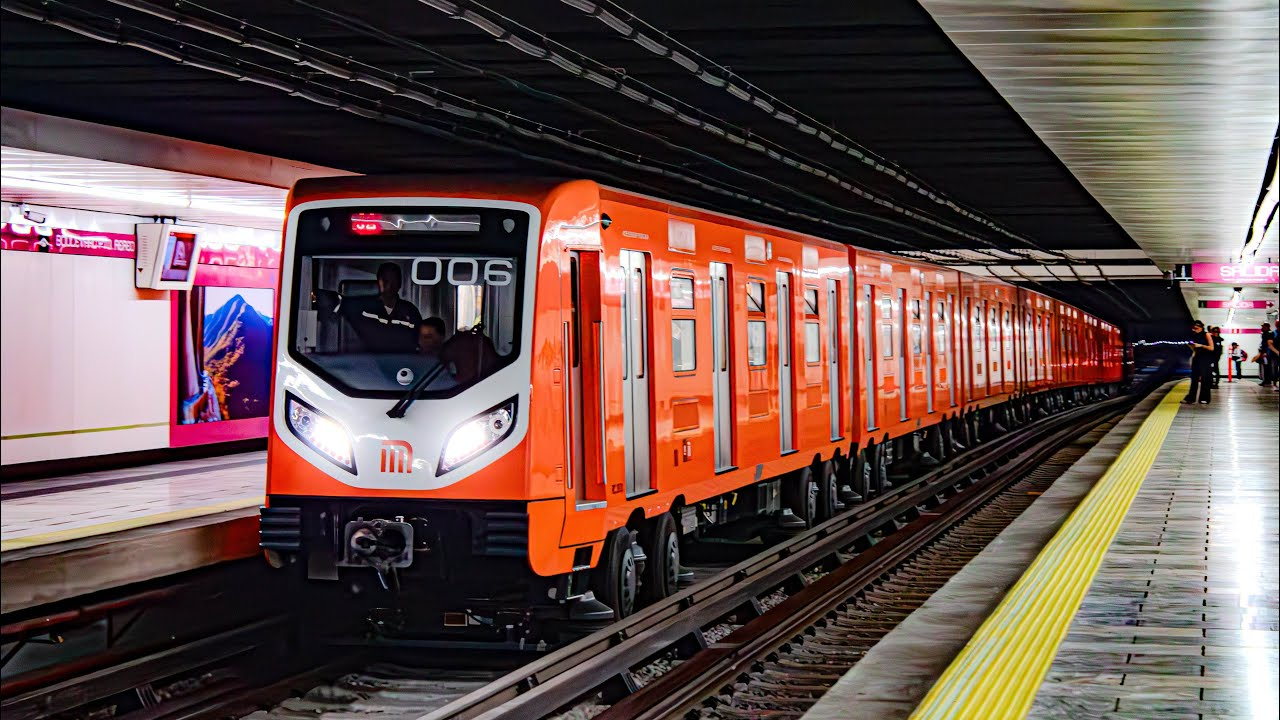
- NM-22 entering Boulevard Puerto Aéreo station on Line 1, the first to open on the network

Overview
- Owner: Mexico City Government
- Area served: Greater Mexico City
- Locale: Mexico City
- Transit type: Rapid transit
- Number of lines: 12
- Number of stations: 195
- Daily ridership: 4,534,383 (2019)
- Annual ridership: 1.155 billion (2023)
- Chief executive: Adrián Rubalcava
- Website: metro.cdmx.gob.mx

Operation
- Began operation: 4 September 1969; 57 years ago
- Operator: Sistema de Transporte Colectivo
- Number of vehicles: 390

Technical
- System length: 200.9 km (124.8 mi) revenue; 226.5 km (140.7 mi) total
- Track gauge: 1,435 mm (4 ft 8 1/2 in) standard gauge
System map
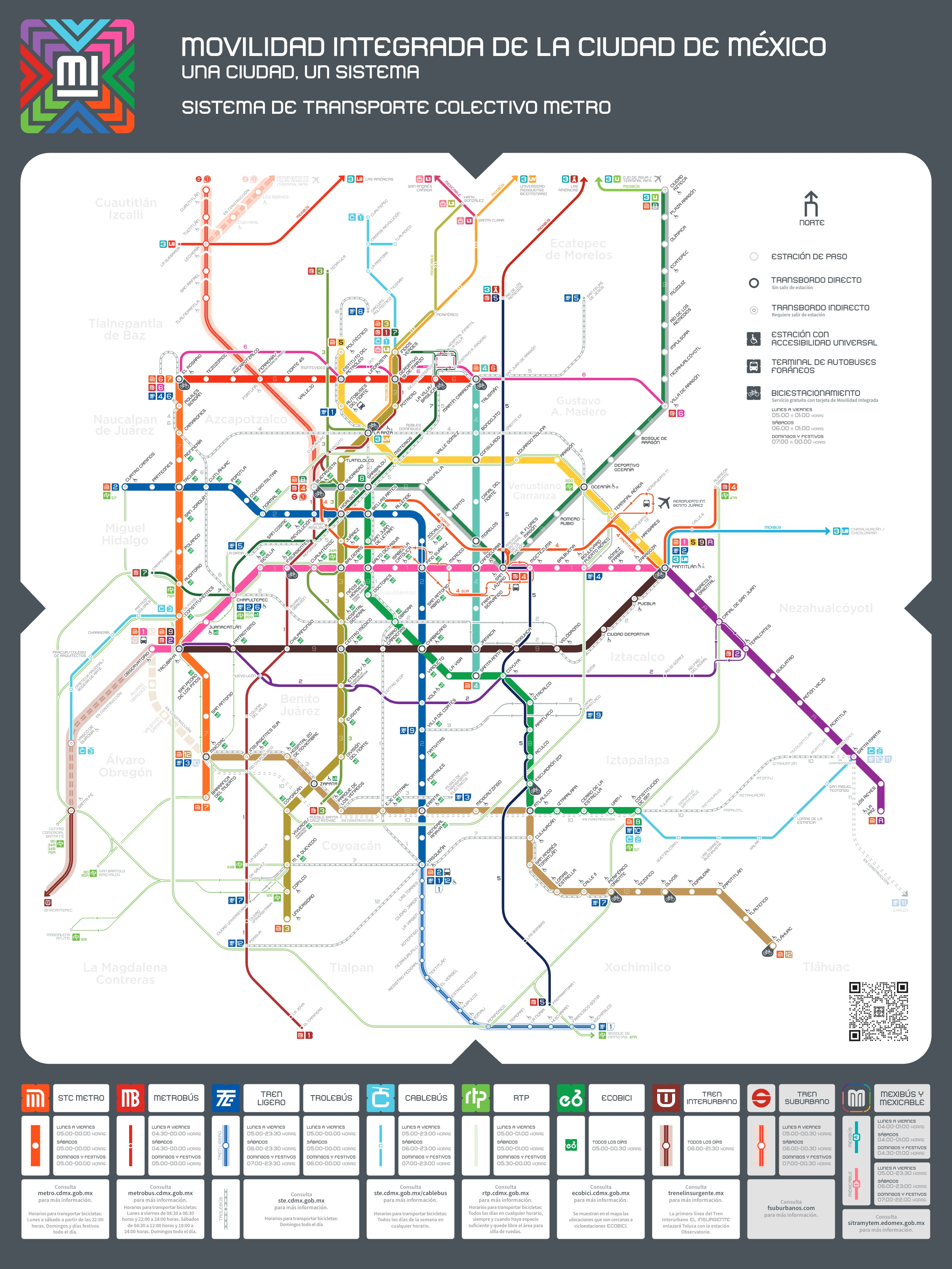

The Mexico City Metro (Spanish: Metro de la Ciudad de México) is a rapid transit system serving Greater Mexico City, including parts of the State of Mexico. Operated by the Sistema de Transporte Colectivo (STC), it is the second-largest rapid transit system in North America after the New York City Subway and forms part of the Mexico City Integrated Mobility System.

The first line opened on 4 September 1969 with 12.7 kilometres (7.9 mi) of route and 16 stations. The system was last extended in 2015 and now comprises 12 lines, 195 stations, and just over 200 kilometres (124 mi) of route. Ten lines use rubber-tired trains, a technology adopted in part because of Mexico City's unstable soils. The system remained largely operational following the 1985 Mexico City earthquake.

Of the system's 195 stations, 44 serve two or more lines as transfer stations. Many stations are named after historical figures, places, and events in Mexican history. All lines operate daily from 5 a.m. to midnight.

== History ==
Sound of Mexico City Metro train arriving at a station
At General Anaya station.

=== Concept of the Metro and early plans ===
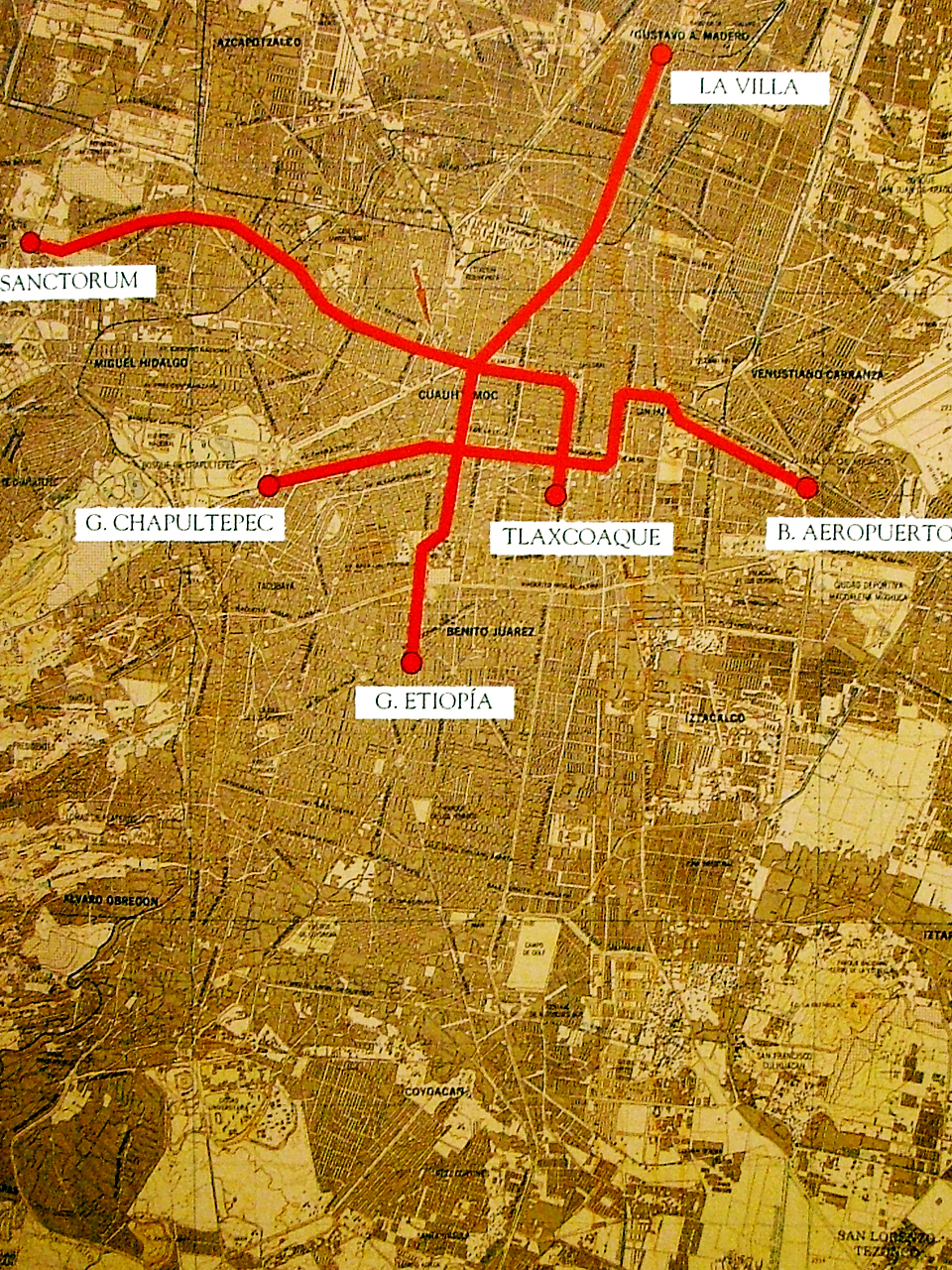
Original "Plan Maestro" for the Mexico City Metro

By the second half of the twentieth century, Mexico City had serious public transport issues, with congested main roads and highways, especially in the downtown zone, where 40 percent of the daily trips in the city were concentrated. 65 of the 91 lines of bus and electric transport served this area. With four thousand units in addition to 150,000 personal automobile peak hours, the average speed was less than walking pace.

The principal promoter of the construction of the Mexico City Metro was engineer Bernardo Quintana, who was in charge of the construction company Ingenieros Civiles y Asociados (Civil Engineers and Associates). He carried out a series of studies that resulted in a draft plan which would ultimately lead to the construction of the Mexico City Metro. This plan was shown to different authorities of Mexico City but it was not made official until 29 April 1967, when the Government Gazette ("Diario Oficial de la Federación") published the presidential decree that created a public decentralized organization, the Sistema de Transporte Colectivo, with the proposal to build, operate and run an underground rapid transit network as part of Mexico City's public transport system.

The Mexico City Metro benefited from a great amount of technical assistance provided by France. RATP's engineering branch SOFRETU played a major role in its initial planning and the design of the first lines, hence the choice of tyre/rail technology.

On 19 June 1967, at the crossroads of Chapultepec Avenue with Avenida Bucareli, the inauguration ceremony for the Mexico City Metro took place. Two years later, on 4 September 1969, an orange train made the inaugural trip between Zaragoza and Insurgentes stations, thus beginning daily operation that continues to this day.

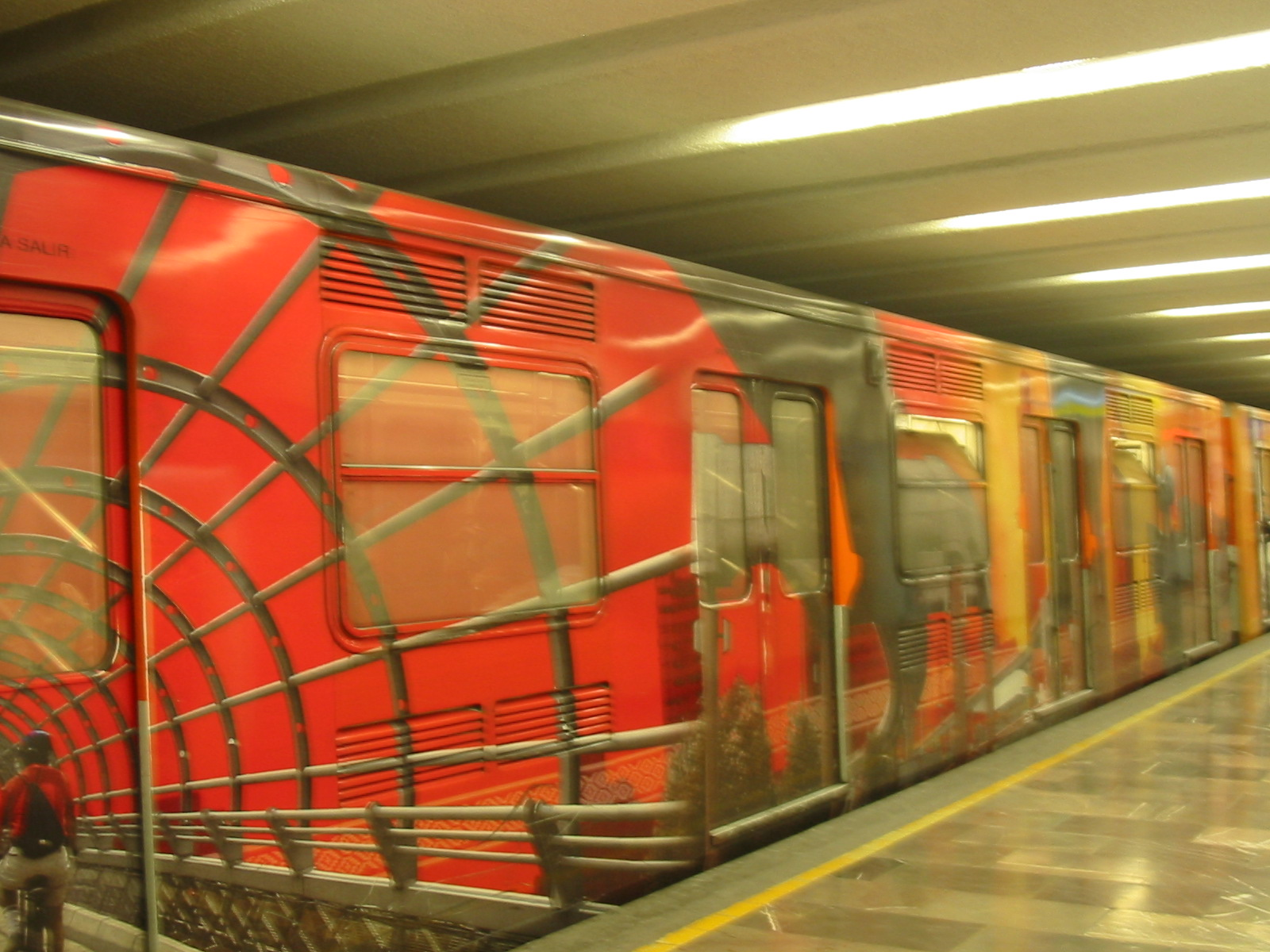
Mexico City Metro train in Bellas Artes station, decorated with images related to the city

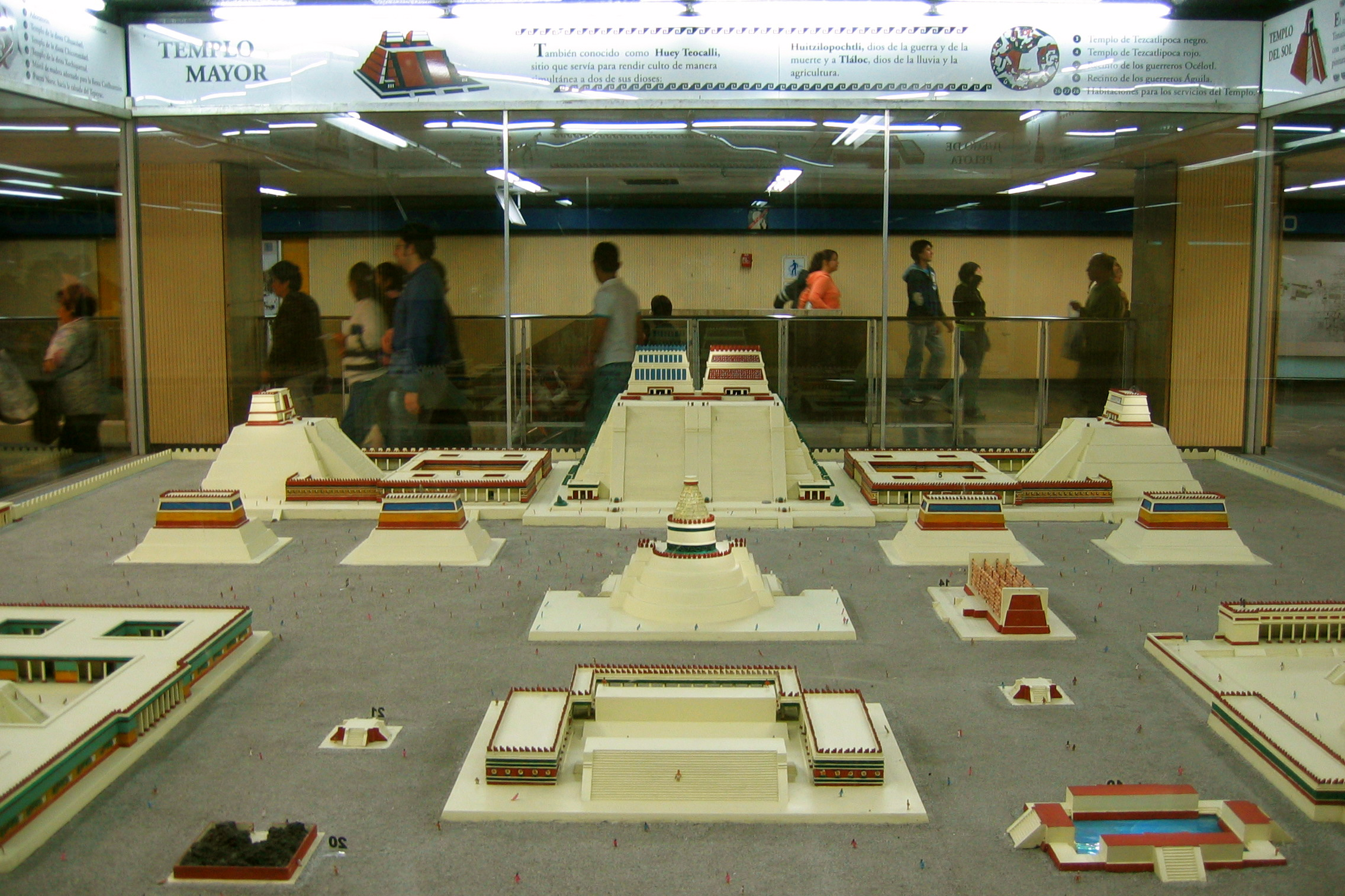
Model of the Templo Mayor of Tenochtitlan displayed at Zócalo/Tenochtitlan station. Such displays in some stations are an opportunity to educate Metro riders about the city's history.

=== First stage (1967–1972) ===
The first stage of construction comprised the construction, done by Grupo ICA, and inauguration of lines 1, 2 and 3. This stage involved engineers, geologists, mechanics, civil engineers, chemists, hydraulic and sanitation workers, electricians, archaeologists, and biologists; specialists in ventilation, statistics, computation, and in traffic and transit; accountants, economists, lawyers, workers and laborers.

Between 1,200 and 4,000 specialists and 48,000 workers participated, building at least one kilometre (0.62 mi) of track per month, the fastest rate of construction ever for a subway. During this stage of construction, workers uncovered two archaeological ruins, one Aztec idol, and the bones of a mammoth (on display at Talismán station).

By the end of the first stage, namely on 10 June 1972, the STC Metro had 48 stations and a total length of 41.41 kilometres (25.73 mi): Line 1 ran from Observatorio to Zaragoza, Line 2 from Tacuba southwest to Tasqueña and line 3 from Tlatelolco to Hospital General in the south, providing quick access to the General Hospital of Mexico.

=== Second stage (1977–1982) ===
No further progress was reached during President Luis Echeverría's government, but during José López Portillo's administration, a second stage began. The Comisión Ejecutiva del Metro (Executive Technical Commission of Mexico City Metro) was created in order to be in charge of expanding the STC Metro within the metropolitan area of Mexico City.

Works began with the expansion of Line 3 towards the north from Tlatelolco to La Raza in 1978 and to the current terminal Indios Verdes in 1979, and towards the south from Hospital General to Centro Médico in 1980 and to Zapata months later. Construction of lines 4 and 5 was begun and completed on 26 May – 30 August 1982, respectively; the former from Martín Carrera to Santa Anita and the latter from Politécnico to Pantitlán. Line 4 was the first STC Metro line built as an elevated track, owing to the lower density of big buildings.

=== Third stage (1983–1985), and the 1985 earthquake ===
This construction stage took place from the beginning of 1983 through the end of 1985. Lines 1, 2 and 3 were expanded to their current lengths, and new lines 6 and 7 were built. The length of the network was increased by 35.29 kilometres (21.93 mi) and the number of stations to 105.

Line 3's route was expanded from Zapata station to Universidad station on 30 August 1983. Line 1 was expanded from Zaragoza to the current terminal Pantitlán, and line 2 from Tacuba to the current terminal Cuatro Caminos. These last two were both inaugurated on 22 August 1984.

Line 6's route first ran from El Rosario to Instituto del Petróleo; Line 7 was opened from Tacuba to Barranca del Muerto and runs along the foot of the Sierra de las Cruces mountain range that surrounds the Valley of Mexico at its west side, outside of the ancient lake zone. This made it possible for Line 7 to be built as a deep-bore tunnel.

On the morning of 19 September 1985, a magnitude 8.0 earthquake struck Mexico City. Many buildings as well as streets were left with major damage making transportation on the ground difficult, but the STC Metro was not damaged because a rectangular structure had been used instead of arches, making it resistant to earthquakes, thus proving to be a safe means of transportation in a time of crisis.

On the day of the quake, the Metro stopped service and completely shut down for fear of electrocution. This caused people to get out of the tunnels from wherever they were and onto the street to try to get where they were going. At the time, the Metro had 101 stations, with 32 closed to the public in the weeks after the event. On Line 1, there was no service in stations Merced, Pino Suárez, Isabel la Católica, Salto del Agua, Balderas or Cuauhtémoc. On Line 2, there was no service between stations Bellas Artes and Tasqueña. On Line 3 only Juárez and Balderas were closed. Line 4 continued to operate normally. All of the closed stations were in the historic center area, with the exception of the stations of Line 2 south of Pino Suárez. These stations were located above the ground. The reason these stations were closed was not due to damage to the Metro proper, but rather because of surface rescue work and clearing of debris.

=== Fourth stage (1985–1987) ===
Fourth stage saw the completion of Line 6 from Instituto del Petróleo to its eastern terminal Martín Carrera and Line 7 to the north from Tacuba to El Rosario. Line 9 was the only new line built during this stage. It originally ran from Pantitlán to Centro Médico, and its expansion to Tacubaya was completed on 29 August 1988. For Line 9, a circular deep-bore tunnel and an elevated track were used.

=== Fifth stage (1988–1994) ===
For the first time, a service line of the Mexico City Metro ran into the State of Mexico: planned as one of more líneas alimentadoras (feeder lines to be named by letters, instead of numbers), line A was fully operational by its first inauguration on 12 August 1991. It runs from Pantitlán to La Paz, located in the municipality of the same name. This line was built almost entirely above ground, and to reduce the cost of maintenance, steel railway tracks and overhead lines were used instead of pneumatic traction, promoting the name metro férreo (steel-rail metro) as opposed to the previous eight lines that used pneumatic traction.

The draft for Line 8 planned a correspondencia (transfer station) in Zócalo, namely the exact center of the city, but it was canceled due to possible damage to the colonial buildings and the Aztec ruins, so it was replanned and now it runs from Garibaldi, which is still downtown, to Constitución de 1917 in the southeast of the city. The construction of line 8 began in 1988 and was completed in 1994.

With this, the length of the network increased 37.1 kilometres (23.1 mi), adding two lines and 29 more stations, giving the metro network at that point a total of 178.1 kilometres (110.7 mi), 154 stations and 10 lines.

=== Sixth stage (1994–2000) ===
Assessment for Line B began in late 1993. Line B was intended as a second línea alimentadora for northeastern municipalities in the State of Mexico, but, unlike line A, it used pneumatic traction. Construction of the subterranean track between Buenavista (named after the old Buenavista train station) and Garibaldi began in October 1994. Line B was opened to the public in two stages: from Buenavista to Villa de Aragón on 15 December 1999, and from Villa de Aragón to Ciudad Azteca on 30 November 2000.

=== Seventh stage (2008–2014) ===
Plans for a new STC Metro line started in 2008, although previous surveys and assessments were made as early as 2000. Line 12's first service stage was planned for completion in late 2009 with the creation of track connecting Axomulco, a planned new transfer station for Line 8 (between Escuadrón 201 and Atlalilco) to Tláhuac. The second stage, connecting Mixcoac to Tláhuac, was to be completed in 2010.

Construction of Line 12 started in 2008, assuring it would be opened by 2011. Nevertheless, completion was delayed until 2012. Free test rides were offered to the public in some stations, and the line was fully operational on 30 October 2012. With minor changes, Line 12 runs from Mixcoac to Tláhuac, serving southern Mexico City for the first time. At 24.31 kilometres (15.11 mi) long, it is the longest line in the system.

Line 12 differs from previous lines in several aspects: no hawkers are allowed, either inside the train or inside the stations; it is the first numbered line to use steel railway tracks; one must have a Tarjeta DF smart card to access any station since Metro tickets are no longer accepted.

In the book Los hombres del Metro, the original planning of Line 12 is described; although it was to begin at Mixcoac as it does today, Atlalilco and Constitución de 1917 stations of Line 8 were to be part of Line 12. The same map shows that Line 8 would have reached the Villa Coapa area and that it would not have had a terminal at Garibaldi, but at Indios Verdes, linking with Line 3. In addition, the book shows that Line 7 would have terminated at San Jerónimo. None of these plans have been confirmed by the Mexico City government.

In 2015, mayor Miguel Ángel Mancera announced the construction of two more stations and a terminal for Line 12: Valentín Campa, Álvaro Obregón and Observatorio, both west of Mixcoac. With this, Line 12 is to be connected to Line 1, providing new metro access to the Observatorio zone, which will become the terminal for the intercity train between Mexico City and Toluca.

=== Archaeological finds ===
The metro system's construction has resulted in more than 20 thousand archeological finds, from various time periods in the history of the indigenous people. The excavations needed to make way for the rails gave opportunities to find artifacts from different periods of the region's inhabitants, in areas that are now densely urbanized. Objects and small structures were found, with origins spanning from prehistoric times to the 20th century. Some examples of artifacts preserved by the Mexican National Institute of Anthropology and History (Instituto Nacional de Antropología e Historia de México (INAH)) are: parts of pyramids (like an altar to the Mexica god Ehecatl), a sculpture of the goddess Coatlicue, and remains of a mammoth. The altar to Ehécatl is now in Pino Suárez station, between lines 1 and 2, and is called by the INAH the smallest archeological site in Mexico. The metro has led to a large quantity of archeological finds, and has also let archaeologists understand more about the pattern of ancient civilisations in the Mexican capital by analysing its underground from various time periods.

=== Architecture ===
Distinguished architects were hired to design and construct the stations on the first metro line, such as Enrique del Moral, Félix Candela, Salvador Ortega and Luis Barragán. Examples of Candela's work can be seen in San Lázaro, Candelaria, and Merced stations on Line 1.

=== Cultural references ===
The Metro has figured in Mexico's cultural history, as the inspiration for a musical composition for strings, "Metro Chabacano" and Rodrigo "Rockdrigo" González's 1982 song, "Metro Balderas". It was also a filming location for the 1990 Hollywood movie Total Recall. Public intellectual Carlos Monsiváis has commented on the cultural importance of the Metro, "a space for collective expression, where diverse social sectors are compelled to mingle every day".

== Lines ==
Each Metro line is identified by a number or letter (in the case of the feeder lines that travel into the surrounding State of Mexico) and an assigned color. All lines operate local service, with trains stopping at every station. The line colors are used throughout the system on station signage, maps, and logos and have remained unchanged since their introduction. Line B is the only bicolour line, using green and gray to distinguish it from the similar green used by Line 8.

Line	Termini		Stations	Length km (mi)	Opened	Ridership (2024)
Line	Northern/Western	Southern/Eastern	Stations	Length km (mi)	Opened	Ridership (2024)
Line 1	Observatorio	Pantitlán	20	16.654 (10.3)	4 September 1969	67,799,070
Line 2	Cuatro Caminos	Tasqueña	24	20.713 (12.9)	1 August 1970	212,233,035
Line 3	Indios Verdes	Universidad	21	21.278 (13.2)	20 November 1970	172,315,795
Line 4	Martín Carrera	Santa Anita	10	9.363 (5.8)	29 August 1981	24,858,632
Line 5	Politécnico	Pantitlán	13	14.435 (9.0)	19 December 1981	59,639,476
Line 6	El Rosario	Martín Carrera	11	11.434 (7.1)	21 December 1983	38,808,804
Line 7	El Rosario	Barranca del Muerto	14	17.011 (10.6)	20 December 1984	85,606,835
Line 8	Garibaldi / Lagunilla	Constitución de 1917	19	17.679 (11.0)	20 July 1994	124,612,151
Line 9	Tacubaya	Pantitlán	12	13.033 (8.1)	26 August 1987	80,632,078
Line A	Pantitlán	La Paz	10	14.893 (9.3)	12 August 1991	71,683,242
Line B	Ciudad Azteca	Buenavista	21	20.278 (12.6)	15 December 1999	128,639,393
Line 12	Mixcoac	Tláhuac	20	24.110 (15.0)	30 October 2012	105,030,602

Under construction

Line	Termini		Stations	Length km (mi)
Line	Northern/Western	Southern/Eastern	Stations	Length km (mi)
Line 12	Observatorio	Mixcoac	3	4.2 (2.6)

== Stations, names, and logos ==
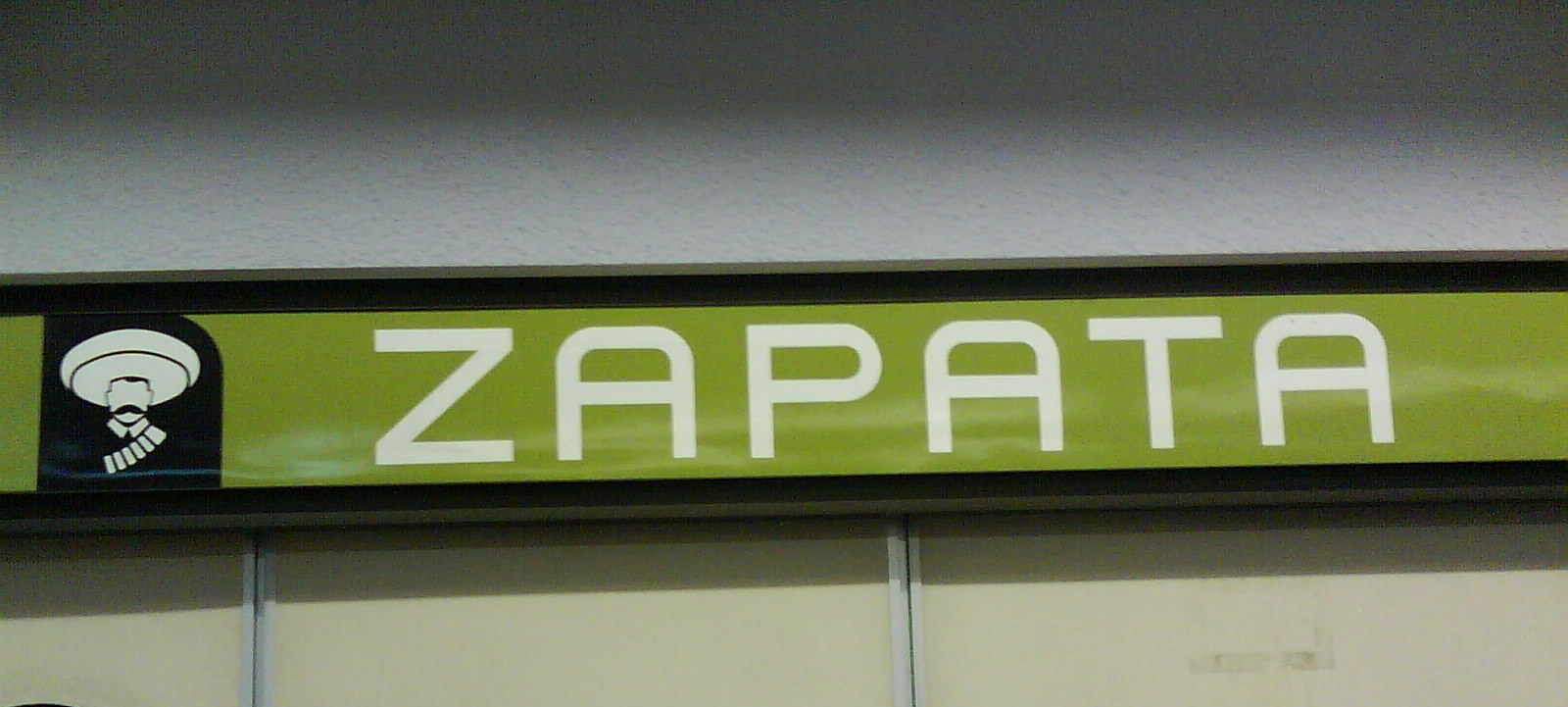
Zapata logo depicting Emiliano Zapata

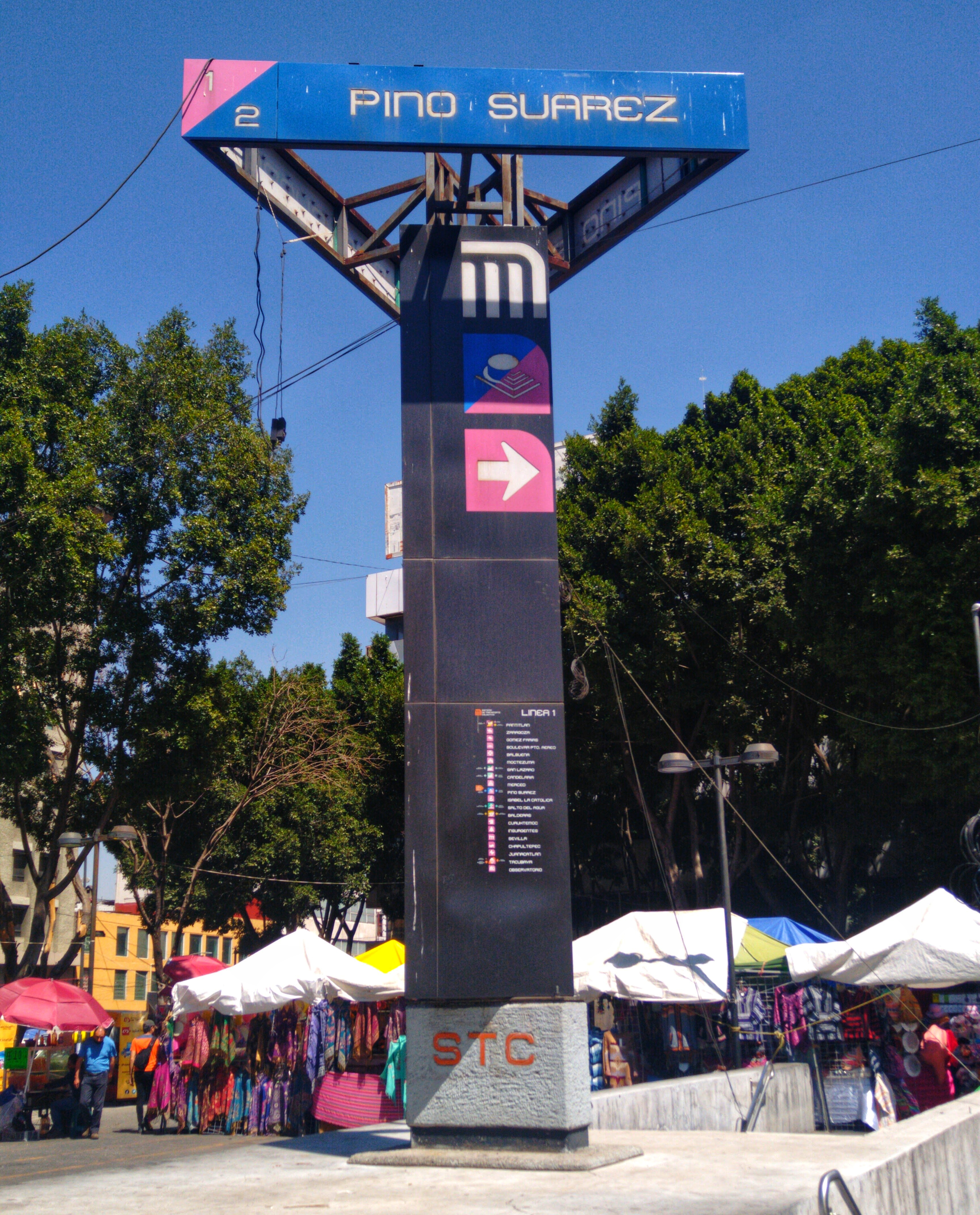
Pino Suárez logo, showing the intersection of Line 1 and Line 2

Many Metro stations are named after historical figures, places, and events in Mexican history, including several associated with the Mexican Revolution. Stations such as Pino Suárez, Revolución, Zapata, División del Norte, Lázaro Cárdenas, and Constitución de 1917 commemorate people, places, and events associated with the revolutionary period.

Each station is identified by a minimalist logo designed by Lance Wyman, who also designed graphics for the 1968 Summer Olympics. The logos generally relate to the station's name or its surrounding area. Examples include the fountain depicted at Salto del Agua, the coyote at Coyoacán, and the silhouette of Benito Juárez at Juárez. The logo system was introduced when illiteracy rates in Mexico remained relatively high, with visual symbols and colors intended to facilitate navigation for passengers regardless of literacy level.

Station logos use the color of the line they serve. Interchange stations display the colors of each line in diagonal stripes. The system of colors and pictograms was later adopted by the Guadalajara and Monterrey metro systems and by the Mexico City Metrobús.

== Transfers to other systems ==
Annual passenger ridership
Year	Ridership	% Change
2002	1,396,408,190	-
2003	1,375,089,433	-1.55%
2004	1,441,659,626	+4.84%
2005	1,440,744,414	-0.06%
2006	1,416,995,974	-1.65%
2007	1,352,408,424	-4.56%
2008	1,460,144,568	+7.38%
2009	1,414,907,798	-3.20%
2010	1,530,352,732	+8.16%
2011	1,594,903,897	+4.22%
2012	1,608,865,177	+0.88%
2013	1,684,936,618	+4.73%
2014	1,614,333,594	-4.19%
2015	1,623,828,642	+0.59%
2016	1,662,562,714	+2.39%
2017	1,615,652,411	-2.82%
2018	1,647,475,013	+1.97%
2019	1,655,049,615	+0.46%
2020	935,176,702	-43.50%
2021	837,473,413	-10.45%
2022	1,057,461,875	+26.27%
2023	1,115,160,023	+5.46%

Transfer sign, "C" stands for correspondencia

The Mexico City Metro offers in and out-street transfers to four major rapid transit systems: the Mexico City Metrobús and State of Mexico Mexibús bus rapid transit systems, the Mexico City light rail system and the Ferrocarril Suburbano (FSZMVM) commuter rail. None of these are part of the Sistema de Transporte Colectivo network and an extra fare must be paid for access.

Metrobús line 1 was inaugurated in 2005. According to the 1985 STC Metro Master Plan, Metrobús Line 1 roughly follows the route planned for STC Metro Line 15 by 2010, which was never built. Every transfer is out-of-station, but the same smart card may be used for payment. All five lines (Line 5 to be built during 2013) offer a connection to at least one STC Metro station. STC Metro stations that connect to Metrobús lines include Indios Verdes, La Raza, Chilpancingo, Balderas, Etiopía / Plaza de la Transparencia, Insurgentes Sur and others.

The sole light rail line running from Tasqueña to Xochimilco is operated by the Servicio de Transportes Eléctricos and is better known as Tren Ligero. Line 2 terminal Tasqueña offers an in-station transfer, but an extra ticket must be purchased.

In 2008, the Ferrocarril Suburbano commuter rail, commonly known as Suburbano, was inaugurated with a sole line running from Cuatitlán to Buenavista as of 2013. STC Metro offers two in-station transfers: Line B terminal Buenavista to the Suburbano terminal of the same name, and Line 6 station Ferrería / Arena Ciudad de México into Suburbano station Fortuna. An extra fare must be paid, and a Ferrocarril Suburbano smart card is required for access.

Another commuter rail, Tren Interurbano de Pasajeros Toluca-Valle de México is estimated to be completed in 2023. This line will connect Observatorio station in Mexico City with Toluca.

== Fares and pay systems ==
Previously, a single ticket of MXN $5.00, allowed a rider one trip anywhere within the system with unlimited transfers. A discounted rate of MXN $3.00 is available upon application for women head of households, the unemployed, and students with scarce resources. Mexico City Metro offers free service to the elderly, the physically impaired, and children under the age of 5 (accompanied by an adult). Tickets could be purchased at booths (except on Line 12). They were made of paper and had a magnetic strip on them, and were recycled upon being inserted into a turnstile. As of February 2024, tickets have been discontinued and riders must obtain a rechargeable card.

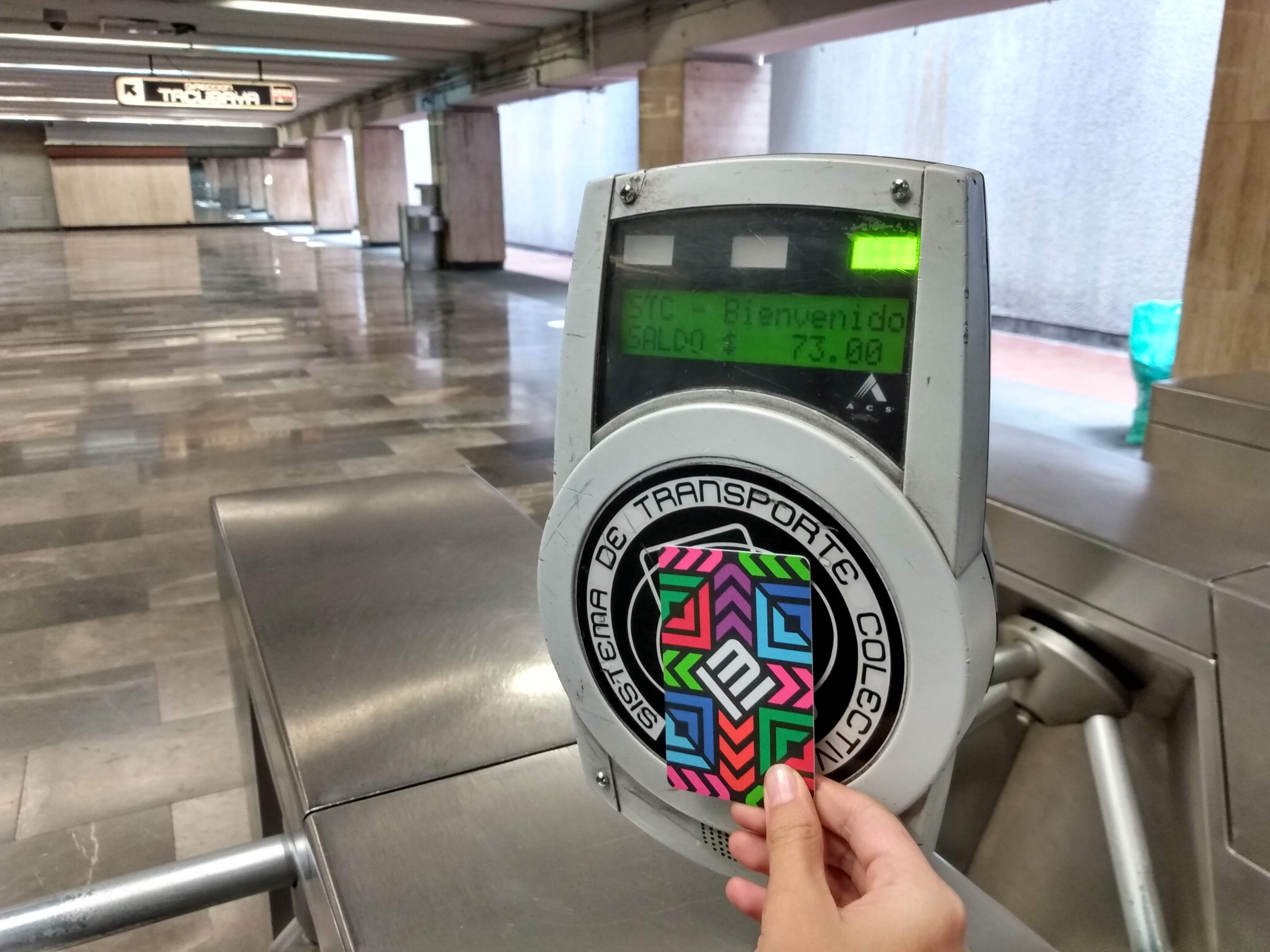
Rechargeable card in use

Until 2009, a STC Metro ticket cost MXN $2.00 (€ 0.10, or US$ 0.15 in 2009); one purchased ticket allowed unlimited distance travel and transfer at any given time for one day, making the Mexico City Metro one of the cheapest rail systems in the world. Only line A's transfer in Pantitlán required a second payment before 13 December 2013. In January 2010, the price rose to MXN $3.00 (€0.15, or US$0.24), a fare that remained until 13 December 2013; a 2009 survey showed that 93% of citizens approved of the increase, while some said they would be willing to pay even more if needed.

STC Metro rechargeable cards were first available for an initial cost of MXN $10.00. The card would be recharged at the ticket counter in any station (or at machines in some Metro stations) to a maximum of MXN $120.00 (around € 6.44, or US$ 7.05 in 2015) for 24 trips.

In an attempt to modernize public transport, in October 2012, the Mexico City government implemented the use of a prepaid fare card, or stored-value card, called Tarjeta DF (Tarjeta del Distrito Federal, literally Federal District Card) as a payment method for STC Metro, Metrobús and the city's trolleybus and light rail systems, though they are all managed by different organizations. Servicio de Transportes Eléctricos manages both the Mexico City Light Rail line and the city's trolleybus system. Previous fare cards that were valid only on STC Metro or Metrobús remained valid for the system for which they were acquired.

== Rolling stock ==
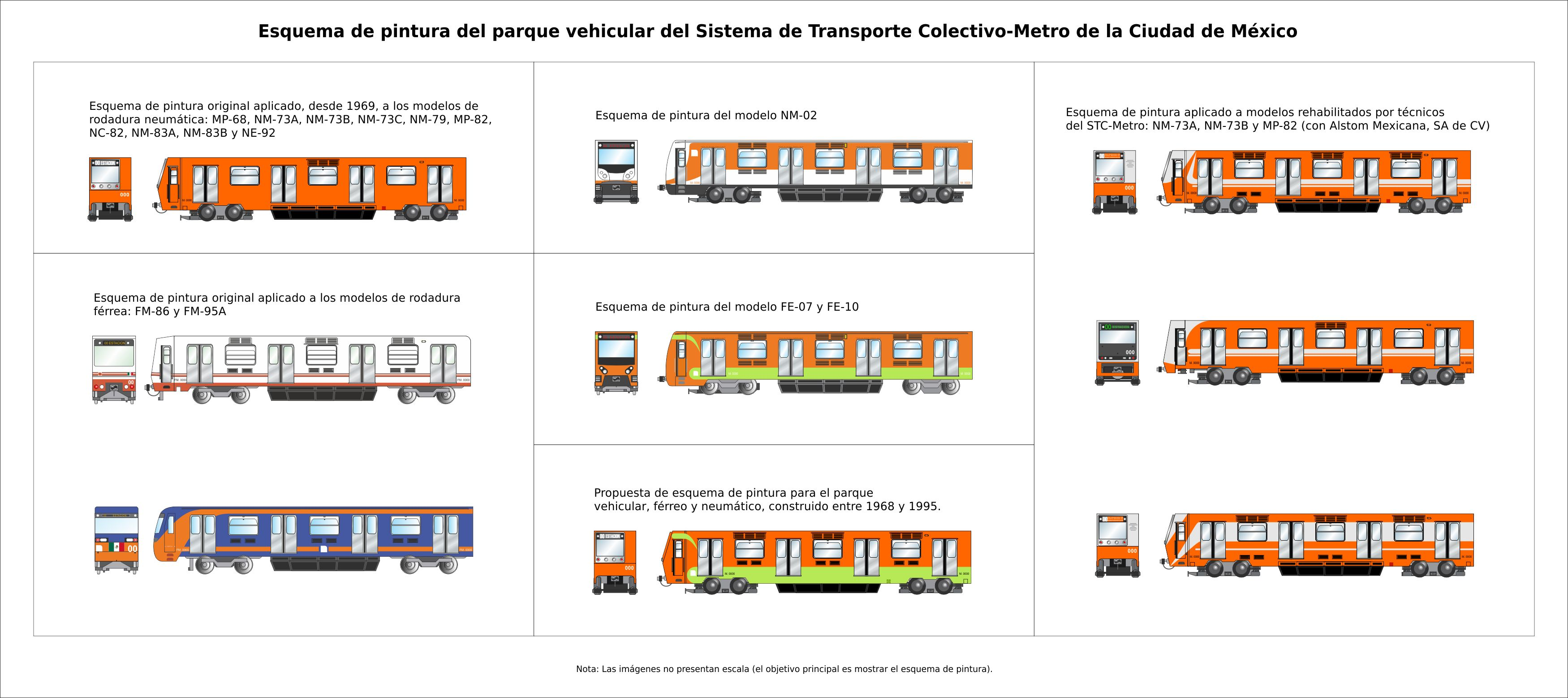
Schematic of rolling stock used on the Mexico City Metro

As of April 2012, 14 types of standard gauge rolling stock totalling a number of 355 trains running in 6-or 9-car formation are currently in use on the Mexico City Metro. Most of the stock is rapid transit type, with the exception of the Line A stock, which is light metro. Four manufacturers have provided rolling stock for the Mexico City Metro, namely the French Alstom (MP-68, NM-73, NM-79), Canadian Bombardier (FM-95A and NM-02), Spanish CAF (NM-02, FE-07, FE-10 and NM-16) and Mexican Concarril (NM-83 and FM-86) (now Bombardier Transportation Mexico, in some train types with the help of Alstom and/or Bombardier).

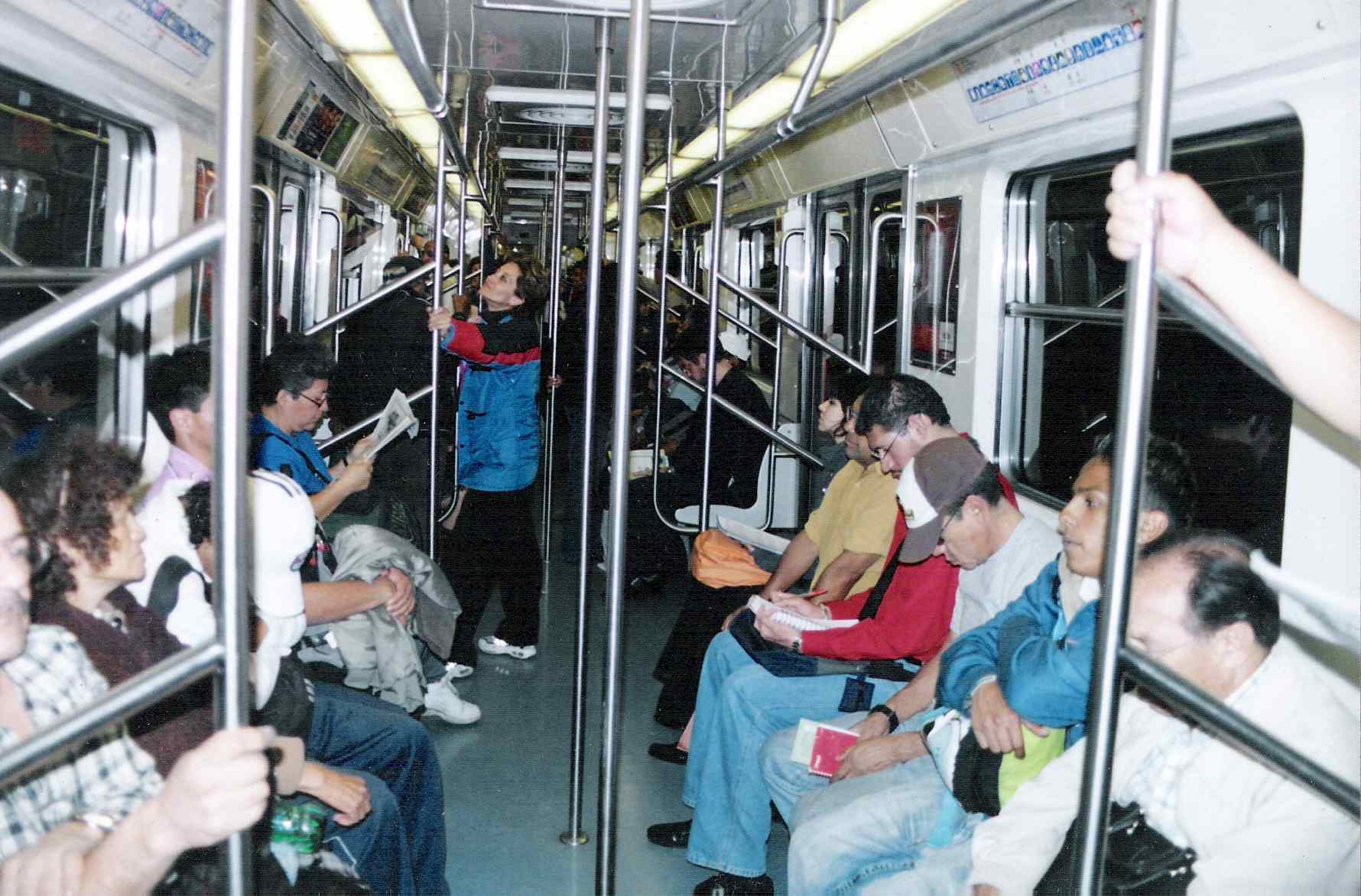
Interior of a subway on line 2 of the subway in Mexico City.

The maximum design speed limit is 80 km/h (50 mph) (average speed 35.5 km/h or 22.1 mph) for rubber-tired rolling stock and 100 km/h (62 mph) (average speed 42.5 km/h or 26.4 mph) for steel-wheeled rolling stock. Forced-air ventilation is employed and the top portion of windows can be opened so that passenger comfort is enhanced by the combination of these two types of ventilation. Like the rolling stock used in the Paris Métro and the Montreal Metro, the numbering of the Mexico City Metro's rolling stock are specified by year of design (not year of first use).

In chronological order, the types of rubber-tired rolling stock are: MP-68, NM-73A, NM-73B, NM-73C, NM-79, MP-82, NC-82, NM-83A, NM-83B, NE-92, NM-02, NM-16 and NM-22; and the types of steel-wheeled rolling stock are: FM-86, FM-95A, FE-07, and FE-10.

From May 2024, Line 1 will receive 29 new rubber-tired trains manufactured by CRRC Zhuzhou Locomotive in China, replacing earlier rolling stock. This is in line with ongoing upgrading works for Line 1, including the installation of CBTC.

=== Gallery ===
Steel-wheeled rolling stock

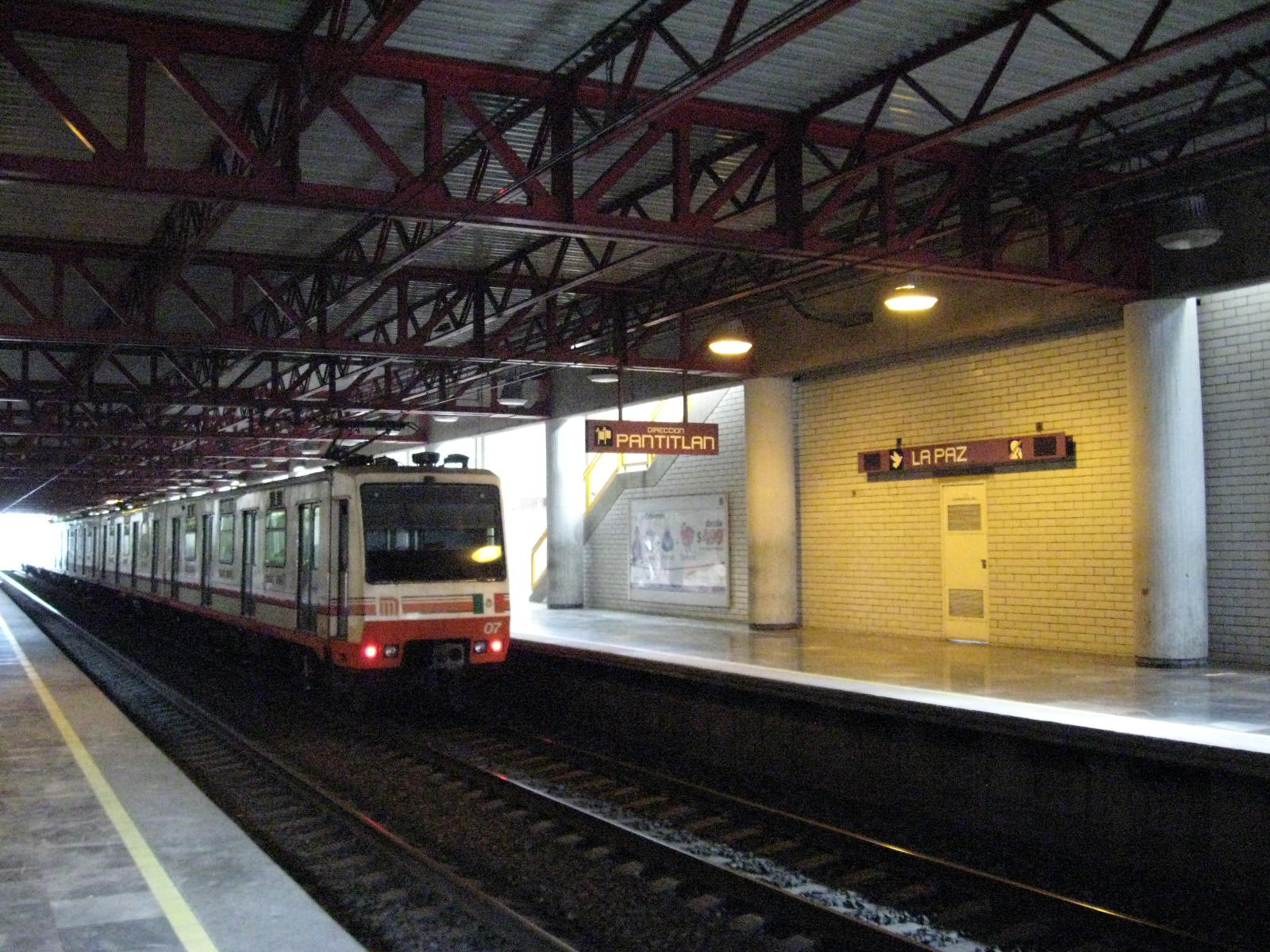
FM-86

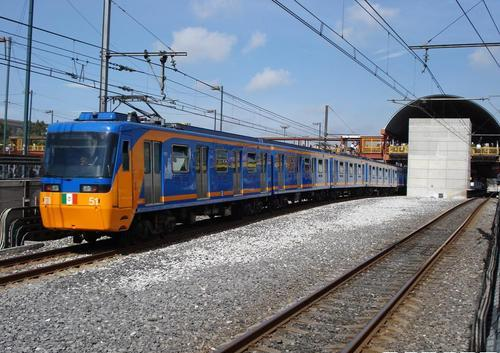
FM-95A

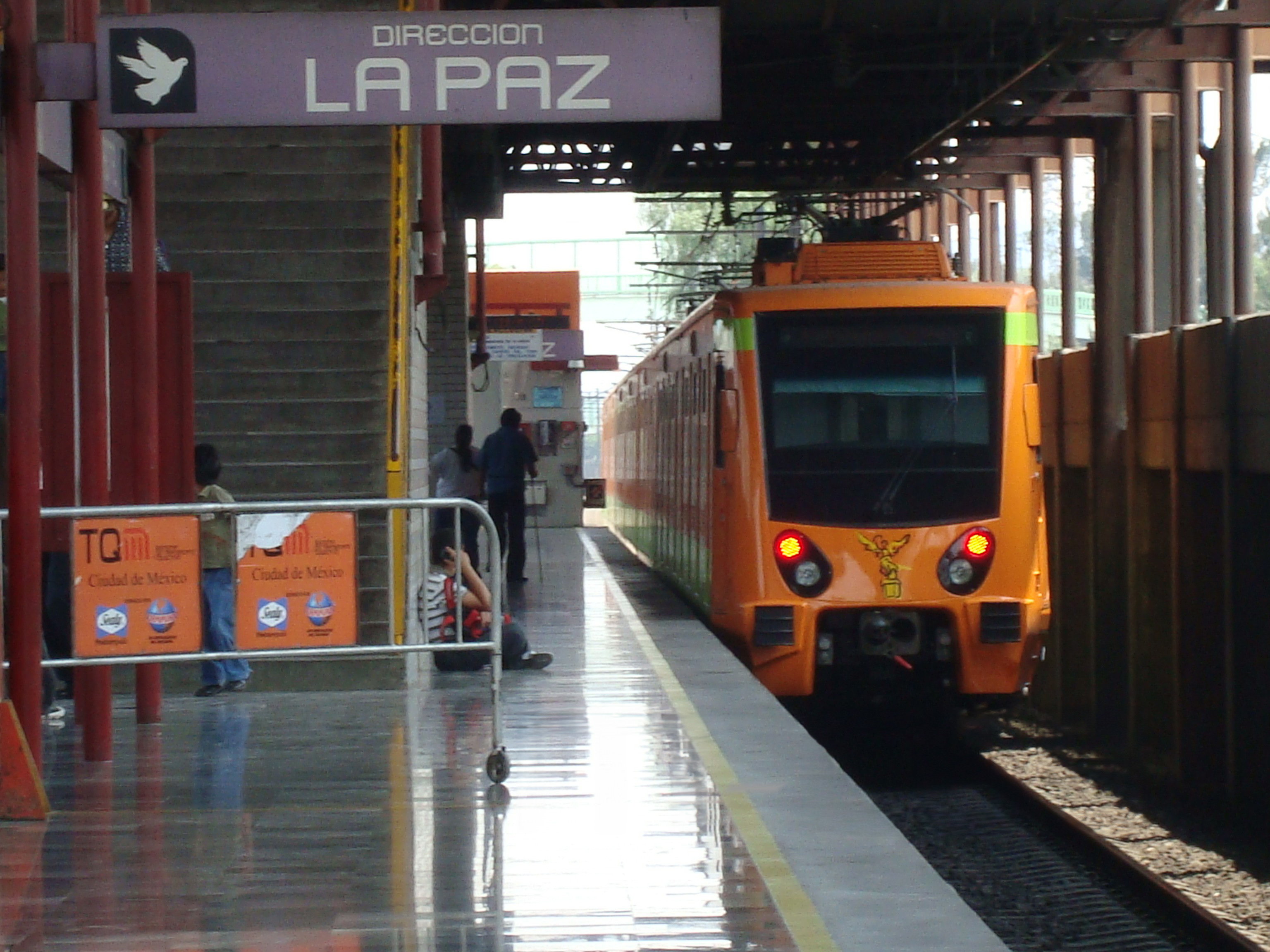
FE-07

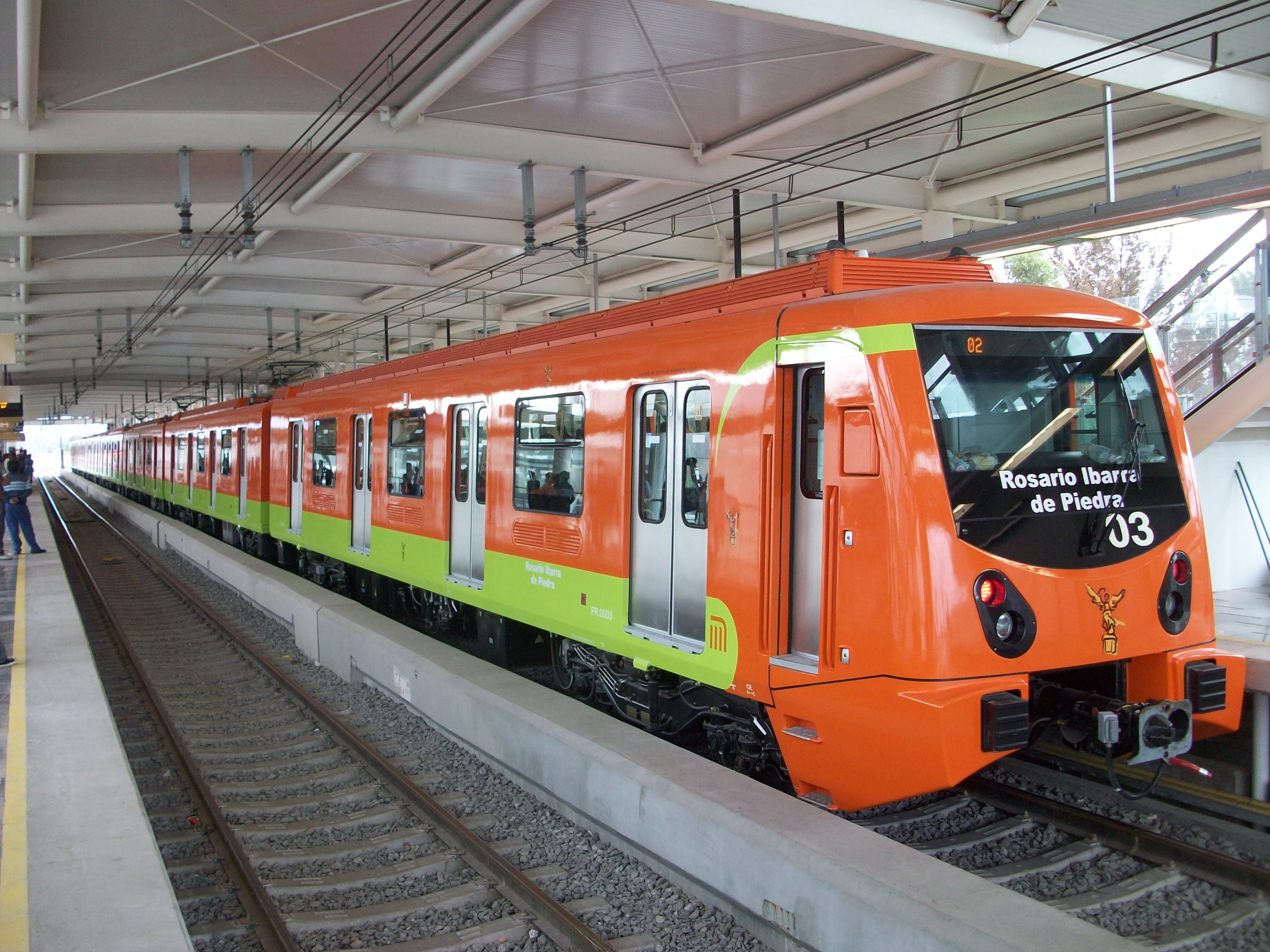
FE-10
Rubber-tired rolling stock

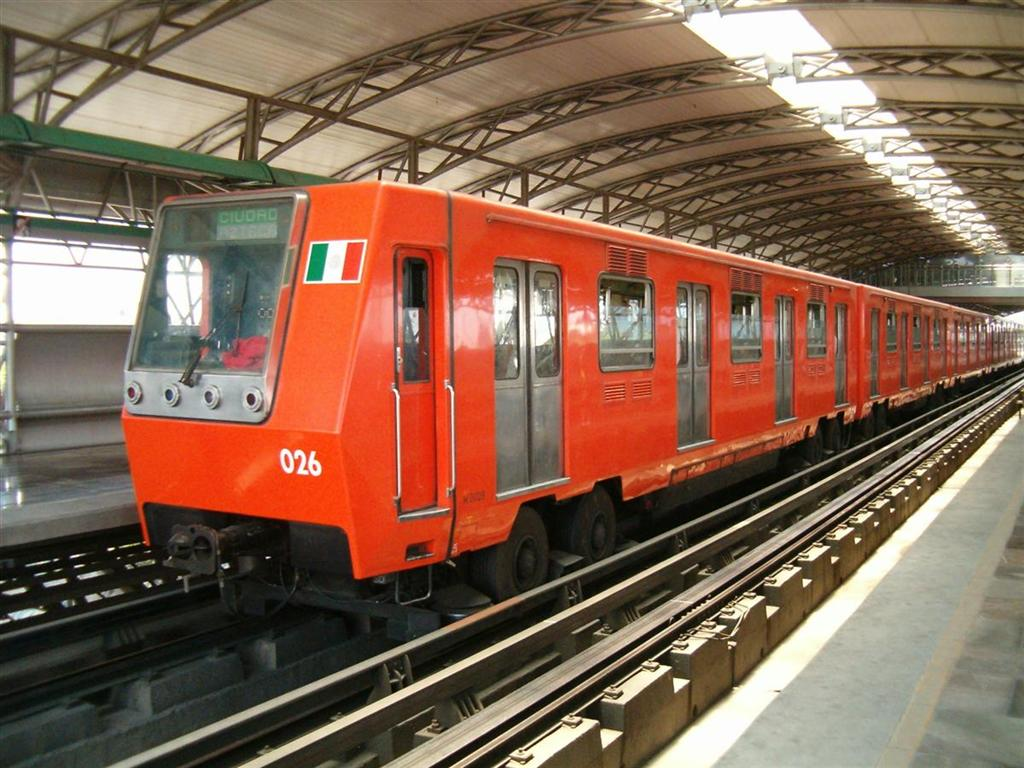
MP-68

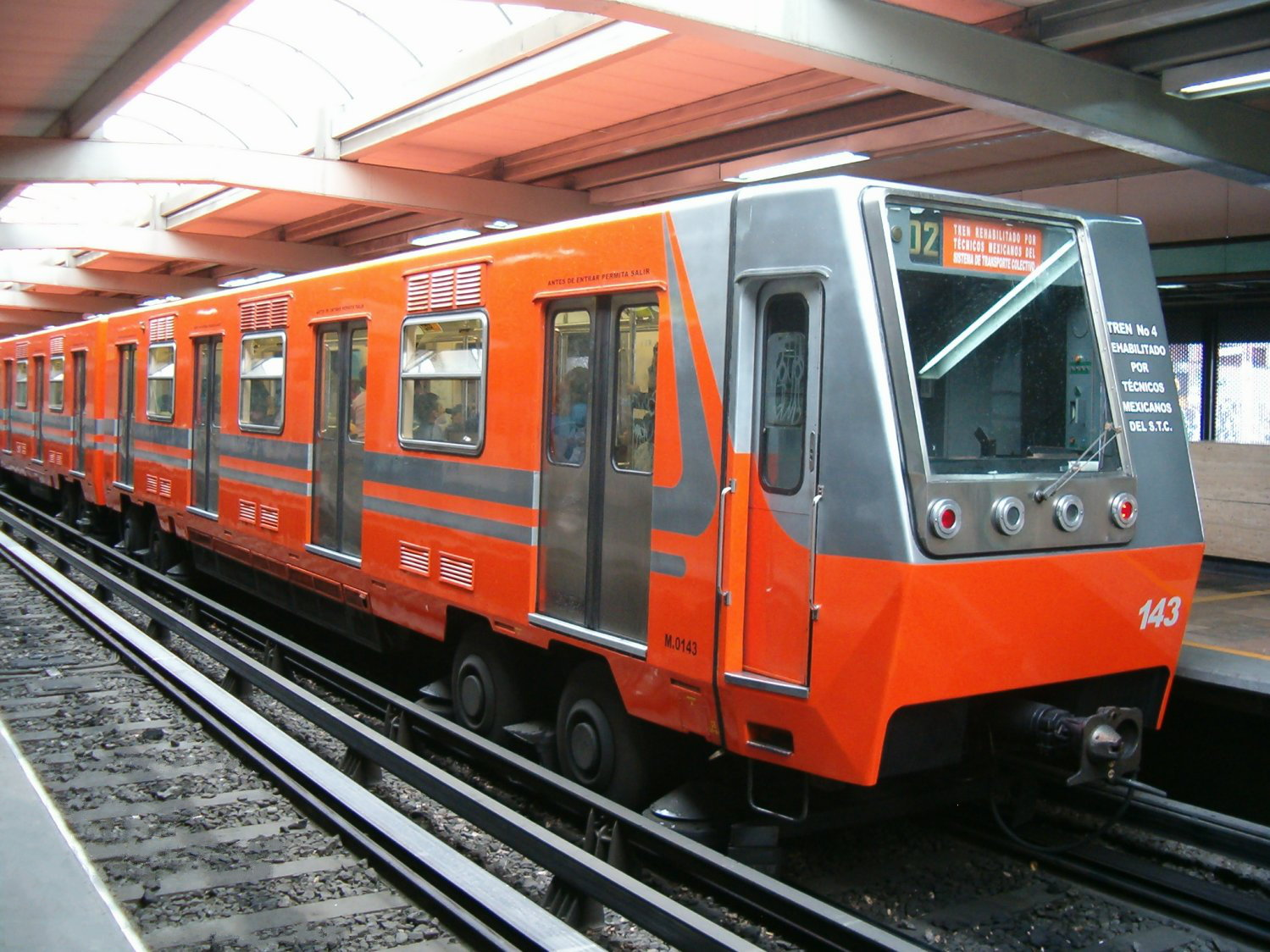
NM-73

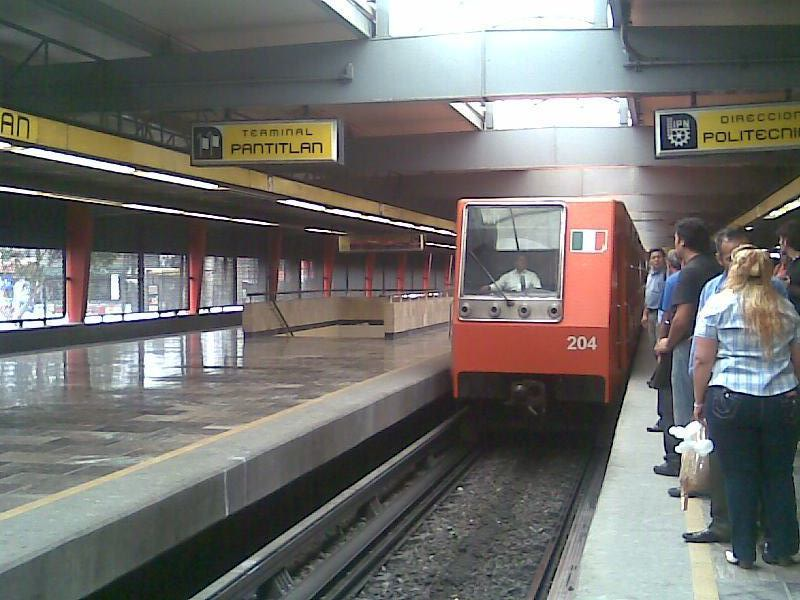
NM-79

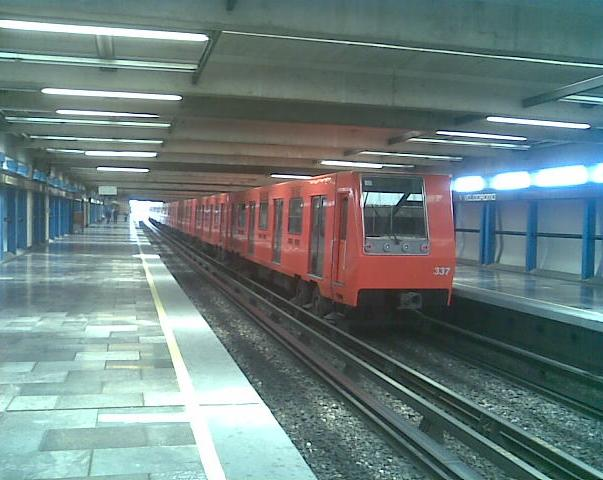
NC-82

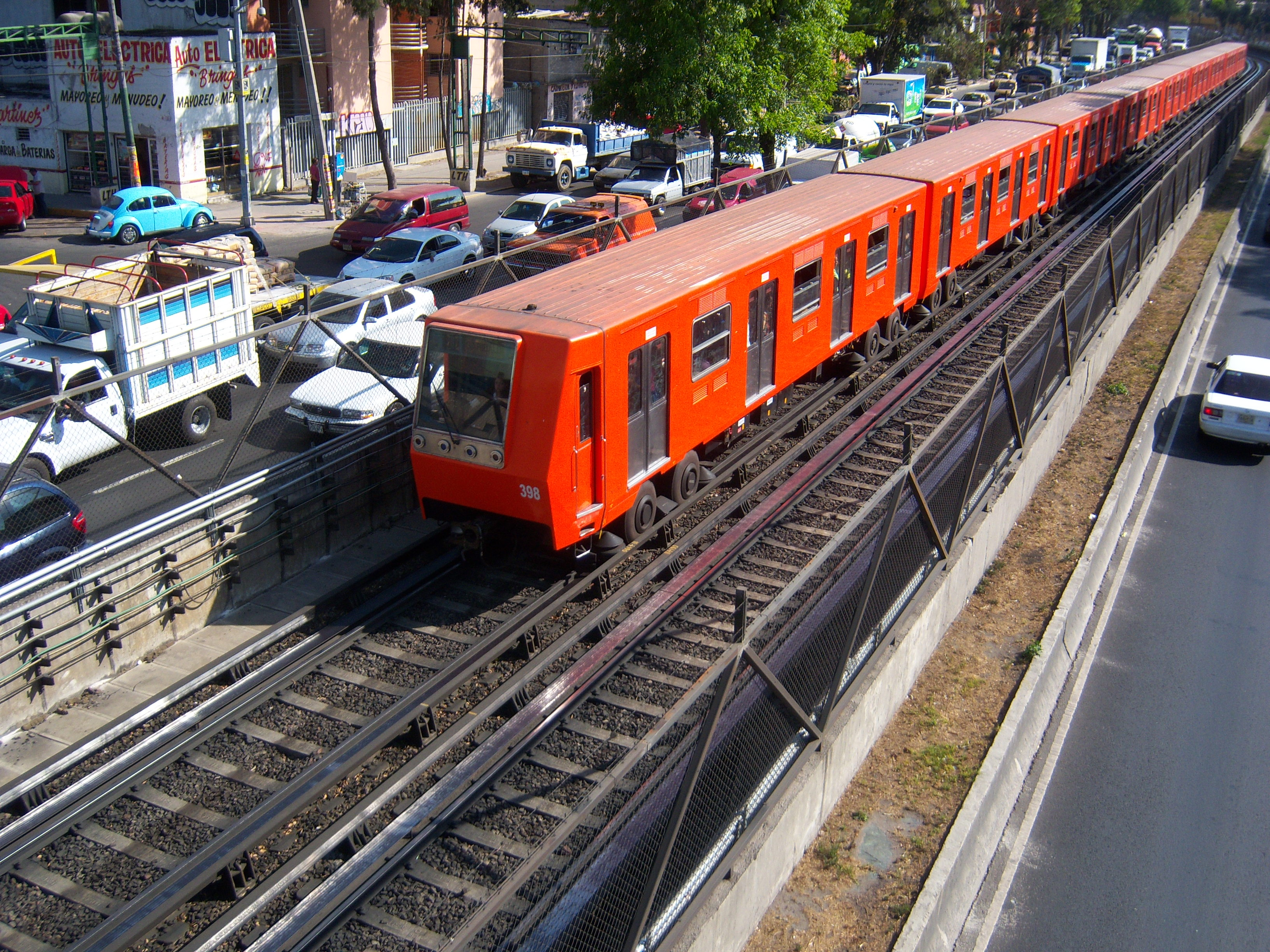
MP-82

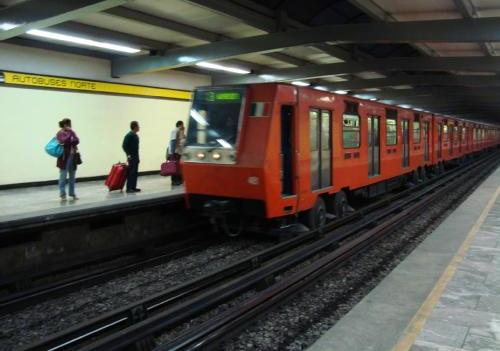
NM-83

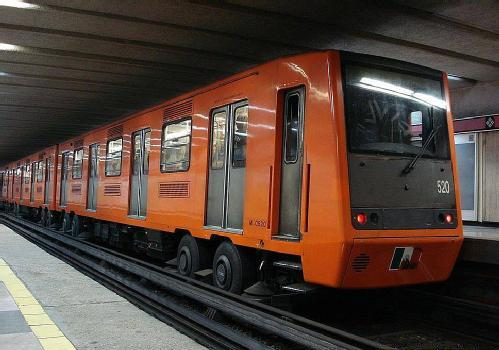
NE-92

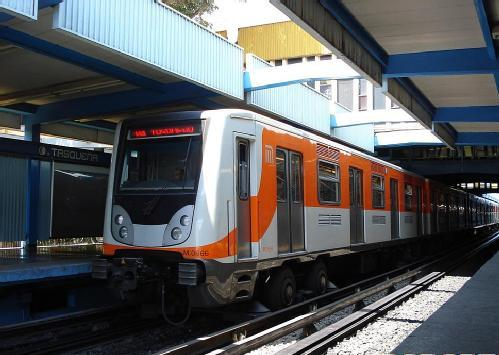
NM-02

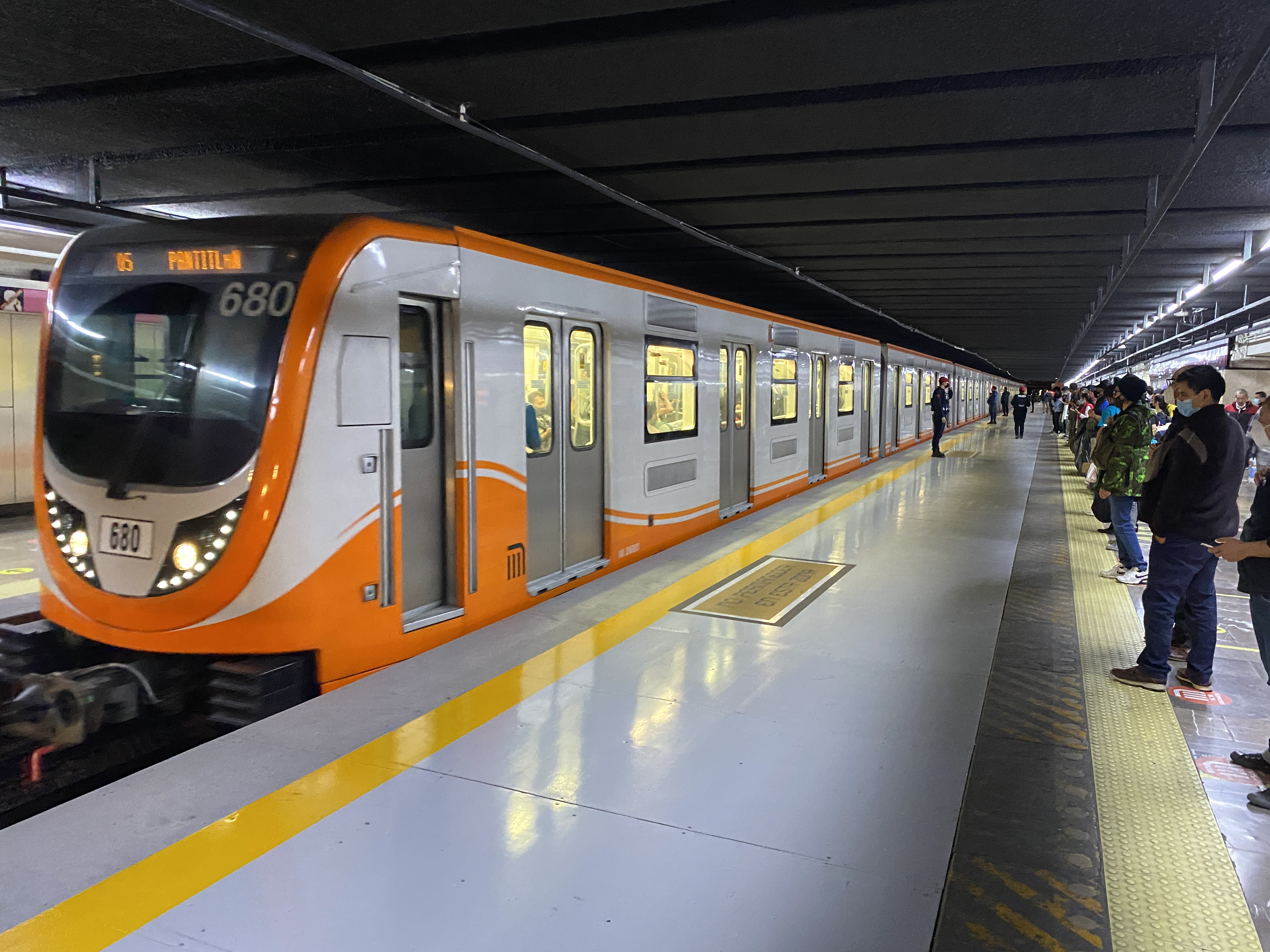
NM-16

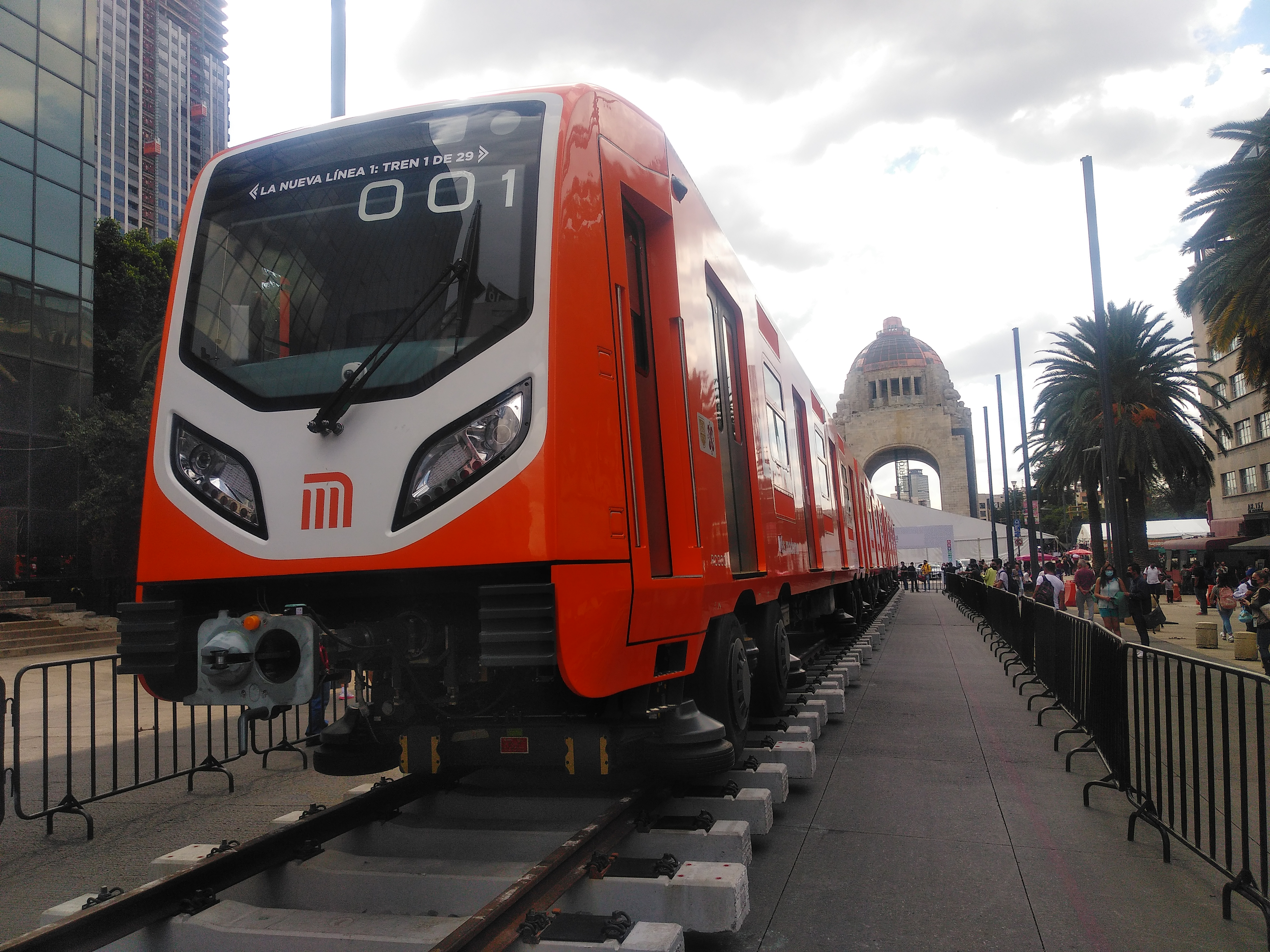
NM-22

== Major incidents ==
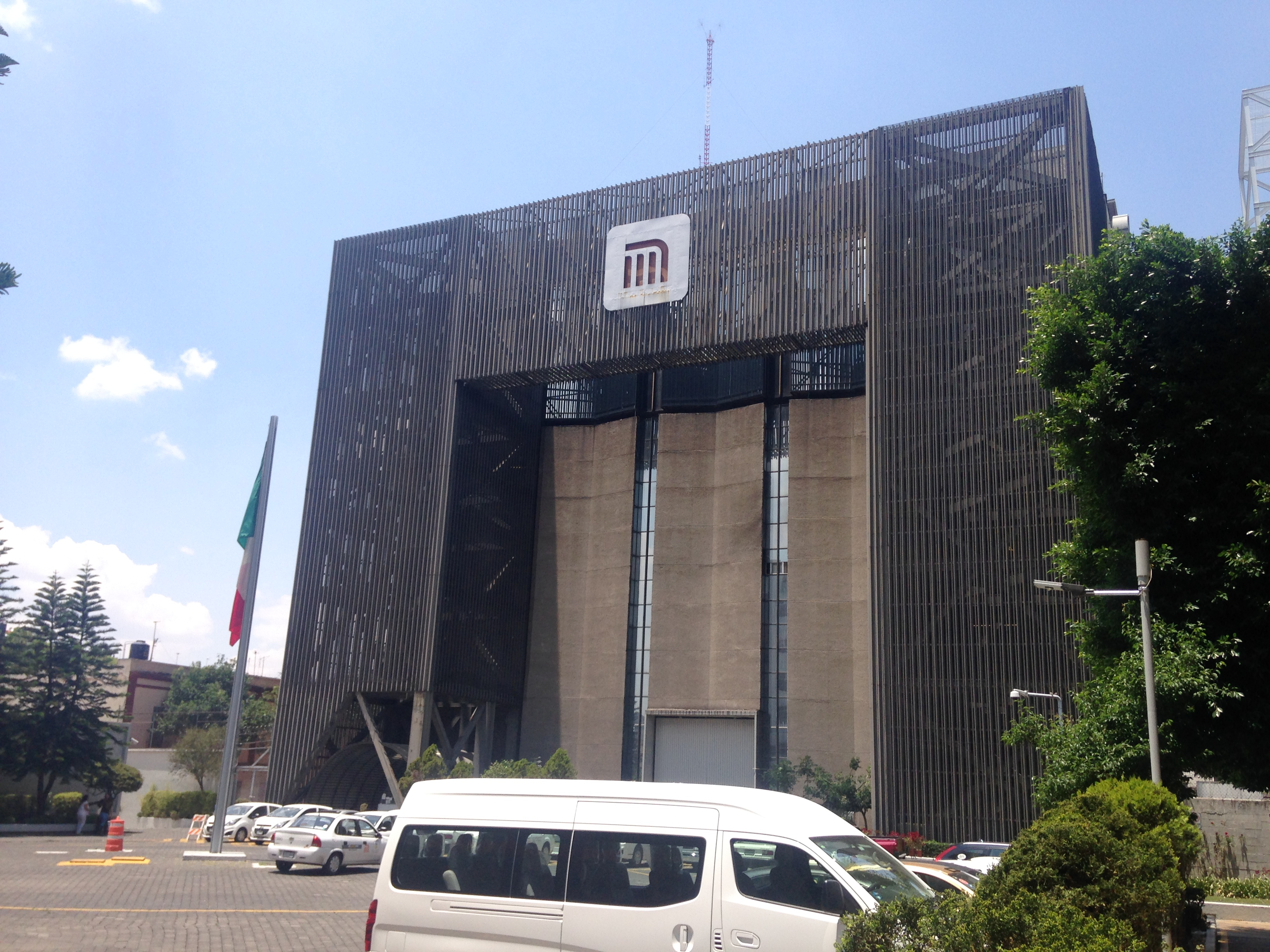
Mexico City Metro Central Control building, in Delicias street, in Centro Histórico. The building caught fire in 2021.

On 20 October 1975, two trains crashed in Viaducto station while both were going towards Tasqueña station. The first was stopped picking up passengers when it was hit by another train that did not stop in time. According to official reports, from 31 to 39 people died, and between 71 and 119 were injured. After the crash, automatic signals were incorporated to all lines.

On 18 September 2009, a man was vandalizing the walls of Balderas station with a marker before being confronted by a police officer. He took out a gun and killed the officer and a construction worker who tried to disarm him, and injured 5 others.

On 4 May 2015, two trains heading towards Politécnico station on Line 5 crashed in Oceanía station. The first was leaving to Aragón station and was requested to stop and wait, while the second did not deactivate the autopilot and crashed into it at the end of the platform. 12 people were injured.

On 10 March 2020, two trains heading towards Observatorio station on Line 1 crashed in Tacubaya station. The first train was parked at the platform when it was hit by another train that was coming in reverse. 1 person died and 41 were injured, all inside the second train, as people in the parked train had been evacuated moments before the crash.

On 9 January 2021, the Central Control Center serving lines 1 to 6 caught fire. During the fire, a female police officer was killed due to a fall in the building. All the stations on those lines temporarily remained closed and provisional transport service was provided by city buses and police vehicles. According to the Metro authorities, the service in lines 4, 5, and 6 would be normalized in days, while that in lines 1, 2, and 3 in several months.

On 3 May 2021, a train was traveling on Line 12 between the Olivos and Tezonco stations when a girder supporting the overpass on which the train was traveling collapsed, killing 26 and injuring more than 70. Service on Line 12 was later suspended, while STC warned residents to avoid the site of the collapse.

On 7 January 2023 at 09:16 local time, two trains collided between Potrero and La Raza stations on Line 3, killing one and injuring 57. In addition to other minor events, city officials said that this accident was a result of sabotage to the Fourth Transformation platform to affect the image of Claudia Sheinbaum, then mayor of the city and a potential candidate on the 2024 Mexican general election.

== See also ==
- List of Latin American rail transit systems by ridership
- List of North American rapid transit systems by ridership
- List of metro systems
- List of Mexico City Metro stations
- List of Mexico City Metro lines
- Metro systems by annual passenger rides
- Metrobús
- Mexico City Light Rail
- Rubber-tired metro
- Servicio de Transportes Eléctricos
- Transport in Mexico City
- Tren Suburbano
