= Adrian Shaughnessy =

British graphic designer, writer, and educator (born 1953)

- Born: Adrian John Wilson Shaughnessy; 17 June 1953 (age 73); Glasgow
- Occupations: graphic designer, writer, educator, publisher

Adrian Shaughnessy (born 1953) is a British graphic designer, writer and publisher.

Shaughnessy co-founded the design studio Intro in 1988 and the publishing company Unit Editions in 2009. Shaughnessy's book How to Be a Graphic Designer, Without Losing Your Soul has been reprinted multiple times and published in several languages.

== Career ==
A self-taught designer, an early obsession with music led Shaughnessy to an interest in record sleeve design. He co-founded the design group Intro in 1988 where its main source of work was the record industry, with clients including Primal Scream and Stereolab. The studio was an early exponent of multi-disciplinary working, combining digital filmmaking with interactive design and other digital modes of expression.

During his time as creative director of Intro, Shaughnessy edited and authored three books on contemporary record covers (the Sampler series) and a studio monograph, Display Copy Only, published by Laurence King Publishing in 2001. After 15 years, Shaughnessy left the studio to purse an interest in writing about design and visual culture, lecturing and independent consulting.

== Writing and publishing ==
Since his first piece of writing appeared in Eye magazine in 1995, Shaughnessy has written regularly for the international design press. Notable articles include a survey of ECM record covers for Eye, 'The Politics of Desire and Looting' for Design Observer and a profile of Daniel Eatock for the Eames Institute. He has written for Creative Review, It's Nice That, PRINT, Etapes, Idea (Japan) and contributed a monthly column to Design Week. From 2006 to 2009 he was founding editor of Varoom (published by the AOI). In 2014 he appeared on BBC Radio 4's Moral Maze to discuss The Moral Limits of Advertising and in 2023 he took part in a BBC Front Row discussion on logo design.

Shaughnessy has also written obituaries of leading graphic designers for The Guardian – most notably on Pentagram co-founder Colin Forbes, Ken Garland and Phil Baines. He is an occasional contributor to The Wire.

=== How to Be a Graphic Designer, Without Losing Your Soul ===
In 2005 Shaughnessy wrote How to Be a Graphic Designer, Without Losing Your Soul. A second updated edition was published in 2010. The book has been reprinted many times and appears in numerous languages, including Mandarin, Korean, Japanese, and various European languages. Since first publication, the book features regularly in lists of recommended titles for graphic designers.

=== Unit Editions ===
In 2009, Shaughnessy co-founded Unit Editions with Tony Brook and Patricia Finegan of Spin "prompted by frustration at the quality of design books available and a faith that quality in both design and writing would find a market". The company was notable for establishing its reputation online and via social media and for producing a range of illustrated research papers (the first of which was on Ronald Clyne's work for the Folkways record label) as well as books.

Shaughnessy works as the imprint's editorial director, to date writing and editing the majority of the published titles, including monographs on a range of well-known designers such as Paula Scher: Works, Herb Lubalin: American Graphic Designer, Lance Wyman: The Monograph and Vaughan Oliver: Archive. In 2013 Shaughnessy published a book of his own essays – Scratching the Surface which covered a range of subjects including education, internships, the definition of practice, the value of awards and socially responsible design.

Unit Editions was nominated in the graphic design section of the 'Beazley Designs of the Year' exhibition at London's Design Museum in 2017 and included in Creative Review's Creative Leaders list in 2018. In 2023, the Unit Editions back catalogue was acquired by Thames & Hudson.

Shaughnessy’s most recent book is the first monograph devoted to Margaret Calvert. Woman at Work was first published as a crowdfunded edition in 2025 by Unit Editions, and subsequently in a trade edition by Thames & Hudson. As the Guardian noted: “Woman at Work is the title of a mighty new tome in which Calvert relates the intertwined story of her life and career. But it also stands as a history of postwar graphic design in Britain.”

== Educator ==
Shaughnessy taught at the Royal College of Art for 15 years. He worked as a Senior Tutor, Visiting Professor, and latterly as an Associate Lecturer. He taught on the Design Products programme and the Visual Communication programme. While at the RCA, in 2014 he co-curated the exhibition 'Graphics RCA: Fifty Years', a retrospective of visual design at the RCA. He continues to run a series of online courses short courses – physical and online – in typography and editorial design.

In 2012 he received an Honorary MA from the University of the Creative Arts. He also regularly gives talks on the international design conference circuit, most recently on the subject of AI and creativity. Between 2017 and 2024, Shaughnessy worked as a consultant for the Beijing-based School of International Art (SIA), which frequently entailed travel to the group's many teaching centres in major Chinese cities.

== Published work ==
Sampler: Contemporary Music Graphics, 1999. (Laurence King Publishing)

Sampler 2: Art, Pop and Contemporary Music Graphics, 2000. (Laurence King Publishing)

Display Copy Only: A Book of Intro Work, 2001. (Laurence King Publishing)

How To Be A Graphic Designer, Without Losing Your Soul, 2005 (revised 2010). (Laurence King Publishing)

Graphic Design: A User's Manual, 2009. (Laurence King Publishing)

Studio Culture: The Secret Life of the Graphic Design Studio, 2009. (Unit Editions)

Supergraphics: Transforming Space, 2010. (Unit Editions)

Herb Lubalin: American Graphic Designer, 1918—81, 2012. (Unit Editions)

Ken Garland: Structure and Substance, 2012. (Unit Editions)

FHK Henrion: The Complete Designer, 2013. (Unit Editions)

Scratching The Surface: Essays and Journalism, 2013 (Unit Editions)

Manuals 1: Design & Identity Guidelines, 2014, (Unit Editions)

Lance Wyman: The Monograph, 2015. (Unit Editions)

Impact 1.0: Design Magazines, Journals and Periodicals [1922—73], 2016 (Unit Editions)

Paula Scher: Works, 2017. (Unit Editions)

Letraset: The DIY Typography Revolution, 2017. (Unit Editions)

Vaughan Oliver: Archive [Condensed Edition], 2018. (Unit Editions)

What Is Universal Everything?, 2019. (Unit Editions)

Pentagram: Living by Design, 2023. (Unit Editions)

The Graphic Language of Neville Brody 3, 2023. (Thames & Hudson)
