= Álvaro Obregón metro station =

Mexico City metro station

Álvaro Obregón

General information
- Location: Prolongación Calle 10; Álvaro Obregón, Mexico City; Mexico
- Coordinates: 19.39058°N 99.19771°W
- System: Mexico City Metro
- Owner: Government of Mexico City
- Operator: Sistema de Transporte Colectivo (STC)
- Platforms: 2 side platforms
- Tracks: 2

Construction
- Structure type: Underground
- Depth: 29 meters (95 ft)
- Accessible: Yes

Other information
- Status: Under construction

History
- Opening: Expected 2028–2030

Services
Preceding station	Mexico City Metro	Following station
Observatorio Terminus	Line 12	Valentín Campa toward Tláhuac
Route map
Location
- Location within Mexico City
- Area map

Álvaro Obregón is a future station of the Mexico City Metro in the borough of Álvaro Obregón, Mexico City. It will be an underground station with two side platforms, served by Line 12 (the Golden Line), between Observatorio and Valentín Campa stations. It will serve the colonias of Tolteca and Cristo Rey.

The station will be named after the borough, which in turn was named after the 46th president of Mexico, Álvaro Obregón Salido. The expansion of Line 12 was approved in March 2013 and started in April 2016, and the station was expected to open in December 2023. The station was formerly known as "Olivar del Conde". Like the rest of the line, Álvaro Obregón station will be accessible.

The construction of the station began in November 2026. A surface skatepark will be demolished because of it.
