= Hiroshi Ohchi =

Japanese artist

- Born: 1908; Okayama, Japan
- Died: 1974 (aged 65–66)
- Known for: graphic designer

Hiroshi Ohchi (Japanese: 大智 浩, Hepburn: Ōchi Hiroshi; 1908 – 1974) was a Japanese graphic designer as well as a visual designer best known for his work as the first art director of IDEA magazine. He also designed the logo for Idemitsu Kosan.

== Biography ==
Hiroshi Ohchi was born in Okayama, Japan. He graduated from Tokyo School of Arts. He was the first art director of IDEA magazine, a quarterly publication that began in 1953 which "focuses on graphic design and typography, published in Tokyo, Japan." His work has also been featured in several exhibits at MoMa, including "Making Music Modern: Design for Ear and Eye" and "Century of the Child: Growing by Design, 1900-2000." He died in 1974.

== Selected works ==
IDEA #002

IDEA #003

IDEA #021

IDEA #045

IDEA #049

IDEA #064

IDEA #075
