= Universal Everything =

Design studio in England

- Industry: Design studio
- Founded: 2004
- Founder: Matt Pyke
- Headquarters: Sheffield, England
- Services: digital art
- Website: www.universaleverything.com

Universal Everything is a digital art practice and design studio based in Sheffield, England. The studio was founded in 2004 by Matt Pyke, who is the creative director. Pyke studied botanical and technical illustration and then graphic design, before spending eight years at the Designers Republic (1996–2004).

Universal Everything have worked with several brands and corporations including Chanel, AOL, Intel, Nike Inc., Hyundai, Samsung and Zaha Hadid, Apple, and Deutsche Bank and created the moving image identity for the London Olympic Games 2012.

In April 2011, the studio created Super-Computer-Romantics, their first major solo exhibition, for the launch of the new digital art museum La Gaîté Lyrique in Paris.

In February 2014, Universal Everything released PolyFauna, an interactive music app developed in collaboration with Radiohead and the artist Stanley Donwood.

A monograph about the studio's work was published in 2019 by Unit Editions.

== Style ==
The studio utilises modern technologies such as 3D printing, touch screens, motion capture, large format video displays and complex sound design to create large scale experiential works. Its work often incorporates and references architecture, modernism, synesthesia, landscapes, anthropomorphism, human movement, and figurative forms.

== Notable works ==
- Presence, an innovative motion capture work, in collaboration with Benjamin Millepied and The LA Dance Project
- Mobius Loop, a series of 18 large scale video artworks commissioned by Hyundai for their Vision Hall in Mabuk, South Korea, which received a Red Dot Communication Design award
- Evolving Environments, commissioned by Deutsche Bank for their headquarters in Hong Kong
- Walking City, awarded the 2014 PRIX Ars Electronica Golden Nica for Computer Animation/VFX
- Communion, a 360 audio-visual installation
- MTV Worldwide, global brand identity for relaunch of 62 channels
- Transfiguration, an evolving animation
- Screens of the Future, a video series that imagines prototypes for future display technology
- Unconfined, an immersive installation to launch the Samsung Galaxy S8 at Milan Design Week
- Hype Cycle, a series of futurist films exploring human-machine collaboration
- Inside the Sound, a series of 360° audiovisual environments
- Tribes, a study of human behaviour on a mass scale
- Emergence, a VR experience
- The Vehicle of Nature, an installation inspired by Leonardo Da Vinci's studies of flowing water

== Artworks ==
Universal Everything's artworks have been shown globally as part of group shows and solo exhibitions, including at Museum of Modern Art (New York), V&A Museum (London), Central Academy of Fine Arts (Beijing), Garage Centre for Contemporary Culture (Moscow), La Gaîté Lyrique (Paris), Vitra Design Museum (Germany), MAAT (Lisbon), Borusan Contemporary (Istanbul), and as part of Digital Revolution the internationally touring exhibition curated by the Barbican.

Artworks by Universal Everything have been held in the collections at Borusan Contemporary since 2014.

Universal Everything regularly publishes exclusive artworks on the digital platform Sedition.

In June 2014, Universal Everything's work, Walking City, was awarded the PRIX Ars Electronica "Golden Nica for Computer Animation/VFX".

In 2019, the studio's VR artwork Emergence premiered at Sundance Film Festival.
