= 8vo (design) =

Defunct British graphic design firm known for its Factory Records Artwork

8vo was a London-based graphic design firm formed in 1985 by Simon Johnston, Mark Holt and Hamish Muir. It closed in July 2001.

== Notable designs ==
8vo produced the artwork for many Factory Records records sleeves and promotional material.

The firm produced sleeves for music for the band Durutti Column including Say What You Mean, Mean What You Say, Domo Arigato, Circuses and Bread, Valuable Passages, When the World, The Guitar and Other Machines, and Obey the Time.

== Octavo magazine ==
8vo produced eight issues of Octavo – a magazine with a heavy structural, typographic aesthetic from 1986 to 1992 (the last issue was released as a CD-ROM).

== See also ==
- Graphic Thought Facility

== Notes ==
- 8vo: On the Outside, by Mark Holt and Hamish Muir, Lars Müller Publishers, 2005. (ISBN 978-3-03778-019-0)
- Eye, Number 37, Volume 10, Autumn 2000.
