= Ralph Schraivogel =

Swiss graphic designer and lecturer (born 1960)

Ralph Schraivogel (born 4 June 1960 Luzern) is a Swiss graphic designer and lecturer.

== Professional career ==
Ralph Schraivogel studied graphic design at the Schule für Gestaltung Zürich from 1977 to 1982. After receiving his diploma, he opened his own graphic design studio in Zurich. He designs print media and devotes himself above all to poster design. He had a long-standing collaboration with the Zurich art-house cinema Filmpodium, 1983–2006. From the Museum of Design Zurich, he frequently gets poster assignments since 1984. From 1989 to 2006 he designed the posters for the African film festival “Cinemafrica” that got special attention. Ten years after graduating, Schraivogel returned to the Hochschule für Gestaltung und Kunst Zürich as a lecturer, where he continued to teach until 2001. During 2000/01 he was a guest professor at the Berlin University of the Arts. From 2003 until 2024 he taught at the Lucerne University of Applied Sciences and Arts. One-man shows in many locations including Tokyo, Osaka, Tehran, Paris, and Zurich, have helped make his work known to a wider public. His posters are part of numerous collections around the world including the permanent collection of the Museum of Modern Art in New York. Schraivogel is a member of AGI since 1995.

== Individual exhibitions ==
1997: Ralph Schraivogel. Shifted Structure, ddd gallery, Osaka, Japan

2002: Ralph Schraivogel. Posters, Design Centrum, Brno, Czech Republic

2002: Ralph Schraivogel in Tehran, Iranian Artists‘ House, Tehran, Iran

2003: Ralph Schraivogel, Galerie Anatome Paris, France

2004: Ralph Schraivogel, Museum für Gestaltung Zürich, Switzerland

2009: Ralph Schraivogel. Laureat Exhibition, Jan Lenica Award, National Museum Poznan, Poland

2010: Ralph Schraivogel, ggg gallery, Tokyo, Japan

2017: Ralph Schraivogel, Le Signe - Centre National du Graphisme, Chaumont, France

== Awards ==
1994: Gold, Warsaw International Poster Biennale, Poland

1994: Gold, Golden Bee, Moscow International Poster Biennale, Russia

1995, 1997, 2000: Schweizer Design-Preis, Bundesamt für Kultur, Switzerland

1997, 2010, 2017: Grand-Prix, Festival international de l’affiche et du graphisme de Chaumont, France

1998: Grand Prix, Brno International Biennale of Graphic Design, Czech Republic

2001, 2004: Gold, Ningbo International Poster Exhibition, China

2002: Gold, New York Art Directors Club, USA

2007: Gold, Tehran International Poster Biennial, Iran

2009, 2015: Grand Prix, Toyama International Poster Triennial, Japan

2009: Jan Lenica Award, National Museum Poznan, Poland

2010: Gold, Brno International Biennale of Graphic Design, Czech Republic

2011, 2014, 2015: Gold, Swiss Poster Award, Switzerland

2012, 2021: Gold, Toyama International Poster Triennial, Japan

2015: Yusaku Kamekura International Design Award, Japan

2016: Swiss Grand Award for Design, Federal Office of Culture, Switzerland

== Bibliography ==
- Ralph Schraivogel in Theran. Iranian Graphic Designers Society, Theran 2002, ISBN 964-306-360-7
- Ralph Schraivogel. Museum of Design Zurich, 2003, ISBN 3-03778-016-9
- Ralph Schraivogel. ggg gallery, Tokyo 2010, ISBN 978-4-88752-318-0
- Ralph Schraivogel. National Museum Poznan, 2013, ISBN 978-83-89053-49-7
