= Fred Troller =

Swiss American graphic designer

- Born: December 12, 1930; Zürich, Switzerland
- Died: October 11, 2002 (aged 71); Rye, New York, United States
- Education: Kunstgewerbeschule (School of Applied Arts) Zürich, Switzerland
- Known for: Graphic design

Fred Troller (December 12, 1930 – October 11, 2002) was a Swiss American artist and designer known for his bold graphic style. He was a prominent figure in the world of graphic design, particularly renowned for his contributions to the field of advertising.

== Early years ==
Fred Troller was born in Zürich, Switzerland on December 12, 1930. He attended Kunstgewerbeschule Zürich, now known as Zurich University of the Arts, graduating in 1950.

Prior to moving to the United States, Fred and his wife Beatrice Troller starred in Louis de Rochemont’s 1955 film titled Cinerama Holiday.

== Career ==
Troller's career spanned several decades, during which he worked at the Geigy chemical corporation prior to starting his own firm, Troller Associates. His clients included major corporations such as American Airlines, General Electric, Exxon, and IBM.

Troller was hired by Geigy as art director in 1960 and worked there until 1966. His designs for Geigy stood out in the American pharmaceutical market because of his use of Swiss design combined with expressive, experimental photography and graphics, vivid colors, and new printing techniques.

Not long after establishing a name for himself in the graphic design realm, Troller became friends with other well known designers such as Paul Rand, Milton Glaser, Rudolph de Harak, and Massimo Vignelli.

Troller was a professor at the School of Visual Arts and Cooper Union in NYC, the State University of New York, Purdue University, Philadelphia College of Art, Ohio State University, Southeastern University (Florida), Rhode Island School of Design, and lastly, he was chairman of design at Alfred University, NY.

== Legacy ==
Regarding Troller's work, Massimo Vignelli was quoted as saying, "His designs successfully combined Swiss rigorousness with American vitality."

Troller is widely regarded as having popularized the minimalist typographic style known as Swiss New Typography in the United States. Graphic design writer Steven Heller, the author of Troller's New York Times obituary, wrote that Troller's personal approach to the minimalist Swiss graphic design style was to "incorporate geometric forms, jarring juxtapositions of large and small types and visual puns formed from the fonts themselves."

Troller championed the use of bold graphic style in advertising. He believed in the power of visual communication and sought to create designs that would captivate audiences and leave a lasting impression.
