= Idea (magazine) =

Japanese graphic design magazine

- Cover of No. 135 (March 1976), designed by Ikko Tanaka
- Editor: Madoka Nishi
- Categories: Graphic design, typography
- Frequency: Quarterly
- Publisher: Seibundo Shinkosha
- Founded: 1953
- First issue: July 1953
- Country: Japan
- Based in: Tokyo
- Language: Japanese
- Website: www.idea-mag.com
- ISSN: 0019-1299

Idea (アイデア, Aidea) is a Japanese magazine about graphic design and typography. Seibundo Shinkosha has published it in Tokyo since July 1953. It was published every two months until 2015 and has been quarterly since then.

== History ==
Idea replaced Kōkoku-kai, a monthly advertising magazine published by the same company from 1926 to 1941. Takashi Miyayama, Kōkoku-kai's editor when it closed, relaunched it as Idea in 1953.

Idea began as a magazine about advertising art. During the 1990s it gradually widened its focus to graphic design in general, and from around 1996 it published more criticism and regular columns.

No. 333 (2009) was a 226-page issue on the Swiss typographer Emil Ruder, edited by Helmut Schmid. Lars Müller Publishers reissued it as a book in 2017. In 2010, with Kiyonori Muroga as editor-in-chief, Idea received a special jury prize at the 8th Takeo Award for the single-theme issues it had published since No. 300 in 2002.

== Format ==
Since the 2000s, Idea has often asked a single designer to write, edit and design an entire feature. Issues are known for their production, combining several paper stocks and printing methods.

== Editors ==
Editors-in-chief of Idea have included Takashi Miyayama, its founding editor; Yoshihisa Ishihara, in the 1970s and 1980s; Kiyonori Muroga, from 2002 to 2018; and Madoka Nishi, since 2018. Hiroshi Ohchi was the magazine's first art director and held the role until his death in 1974.

== Notable issues ==
- No. 51 (February 1962), with a cover by Olle Eksell and a feature on the work of Ladislav Sutnar.
- No. 75 (March 1966), with a cover by Hiroshi Ohchi, covering the Persona graphic design exhibition and Olivetti's design policy.
- No. 80 (January 1967), including Herb Lubalin's typographic posters.
- No. 84 (September 1967), with a cover by Saul Bass, four of his corporate identity programs, and a feature on Shigeo Fukuda.
- No. 122 (January 1974), covering Wim Crouwel's art direction, Erberto Carboni and the posters of Jan Lenica.
- No. 142 (May 1977), on the design of the SPD's election campaign.
- No. 151 (November 1978), a 25th-anniversary issue on American graphic designers, with a cover by Milton Glaser.
- No. 152 (January 1979), covering the 8th Brno graphic design biennial and a poster exhibition by Kazumasa Nagai.
- No. 157 (November 1979), including David Hillman's editorial design for the magazine Nova and work by Tadanori Yokoo.
- No. 267 (March 1998), "Designers' Commitment to the Olympiad", on Olympic posters of the 20th century, with a cover by Ralph Schraivogel.
- No. 323 (July 2007), on the experimental work of Wim Crouwel.
- No. 329 (July 2008), on the typography of Herb Lubalin.
- No. 333 (2009), on Emil Ruder, later reissued as a book by Lars Müller Publishers.

Idea has also published extra issues on single subjects, including Designers in Italy (1981), which profiled Italian designers including Franco Grignani, Enzo Mari, Armando Testa and Italo Lupi.

== Legacy ==
From 23 January to 22 February 2018, Creation Gallery G8 in Tokyo held Fragments of Graphism: An Alternative History of Graphic Design in Japan, curated by Muroga and Tetsuya Goto. The exhibition took the magazine's long history as its starting point, and its final room held all 381 issues published up to then.
