= Colonia Juárez, Mexico City =

Coordinates: 19°25′39″N 99°9′39.17″W

Juárez
- Neighborhood
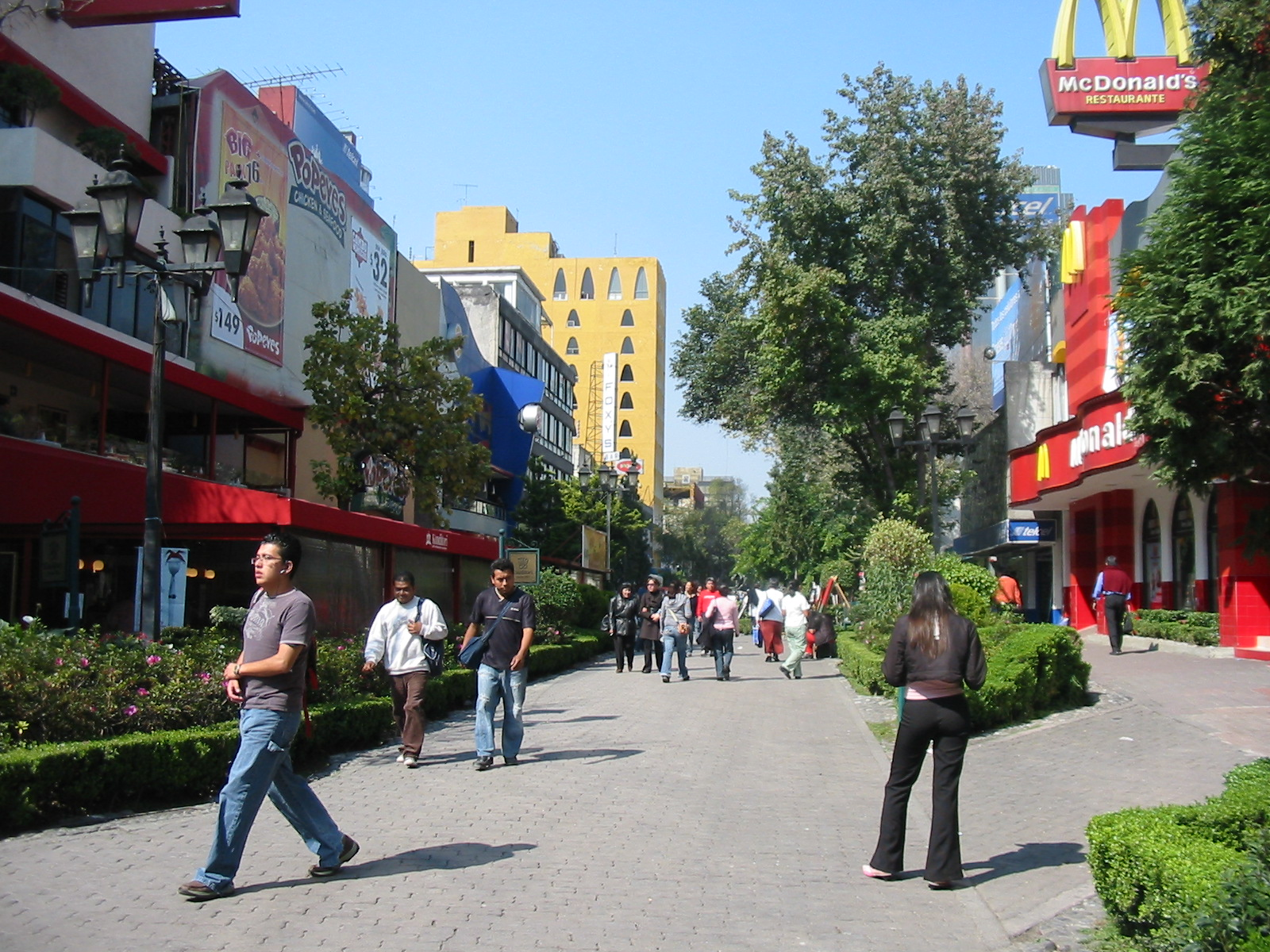
- Genova Street in Zona Rosa

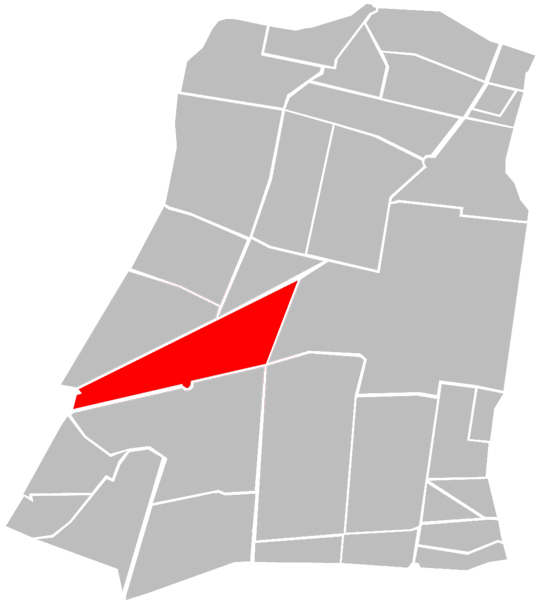
- Location of Colonia Juárez (in red) within Cuauhtémoc borough
- Country: Mexico
- City: Mexico City
- Borough: Cuauhtémoc

Population (2010)
  - Total: 10,184
- Postal code: 06600

Colonia Juárez is one of the better-known neighborhoods or colonias in the Cuauhtémoc borough of Mexico City. The neighborhood is shaped like a long triangle with the boundaries: Paseo de la Reforma on the north, Avenida Chapultepec on the south, and Eje 1 Poniente (Avenida Bucareli) on the east.

It is located between the historic center of Mexico City and the Chapultepec Park area, just south of the Paseo de la Reforma, which is one of Mexico's main commercial districts and its financial center. Since it was established in the late 19th century and early 20th as a haven for the wealthy leaving the city center, the colonia has been in near constant change. Most of the mansions built in the early part of its history have either been abandoned, converted into businesses or been taken over by squatters. However, it has had a cosmopolitan and intellectual reputation since its founding, which was reinforced with the influx of artists and intellectuals in the 1960s. The area has suffered deterioration since the 1980s, due to the 1985 Mexico City earthquake and other factors, but there have been efforts to restore the area's former prestige, including tourism promotion, historic conservation efforts and the urbanization of areas close to Paseo de la Reforma.

The best known area of the colonia is Zona Rosa (Pink Zone) which is a tourist attraction for its artistic and intellectual reputation and is home to Mexico City's gay community. It is also home to "Little Seoul", center of the city's Korean immigrant population.

== History ==
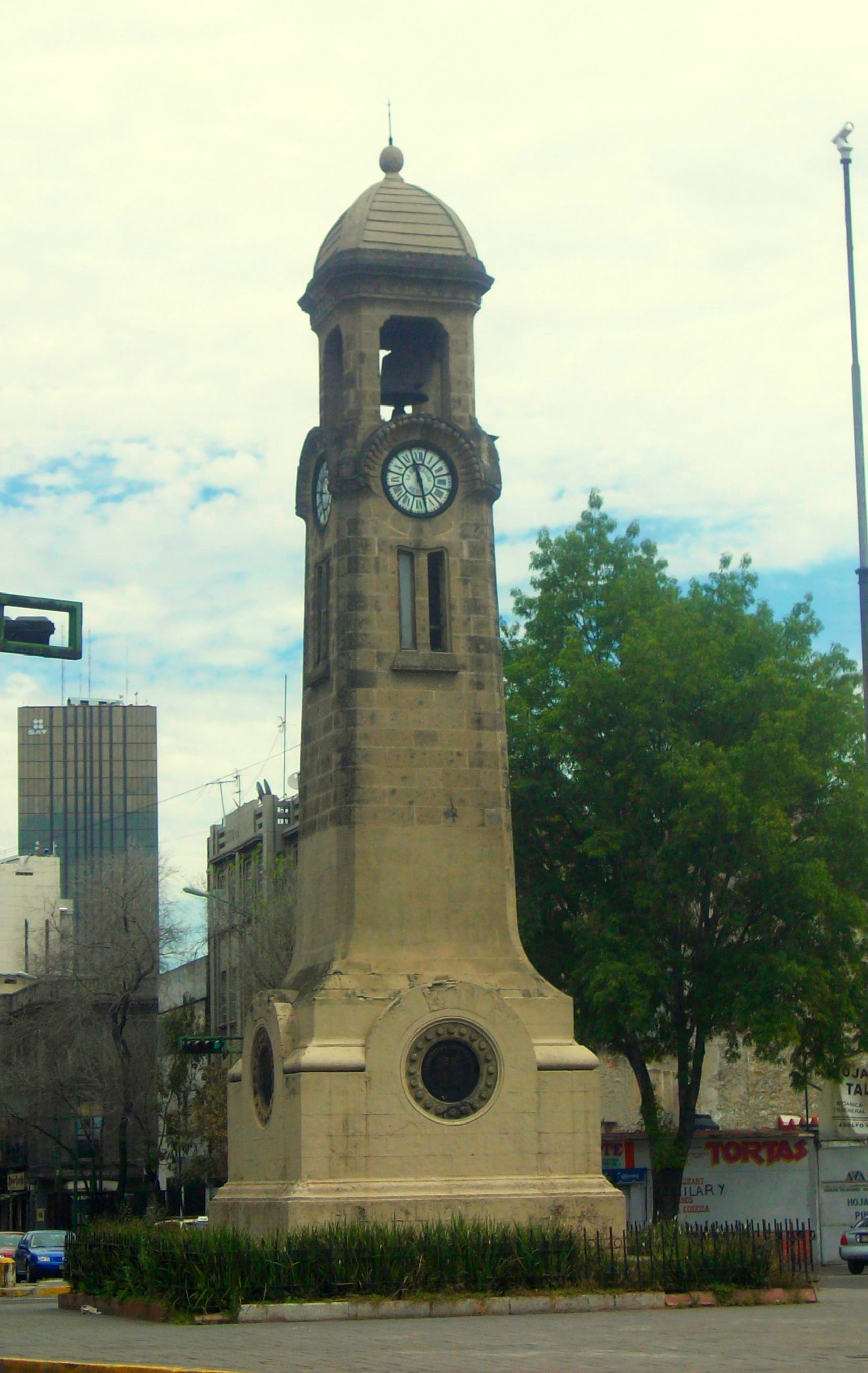
Clock tower on Bucareli Street

In the 1860s this area was shallow lake waters and swamp, and was almost completely uninhabited. However, one reason that the city eventually expanded this way was the decision by Empress Carlota to build a road to connect the Castle of Chapultepec to the downtown of the city. The road was designed by Austrian engineer Allois Bollan Kuhmackl in 1865 with its trajectory recommended by the emperor. Its use was exclusive to the emperor and his retinue. When Republican forces overthrew the emperor, this avenue was named Paseo Degollado. A few years later, it received its current name. Between 1872 and 1876, President Lerdo de Tejada widened the road to its current dimensions and opened it to the public in 1877.

In the very late 19th century and early 20th century, the historic center of Mexico City was deteriorating as its colonial and Baroque buildings came to be seen as antiquidated. Many of the city's elite moved to new neighborhoods being constructed in the western suburbs along Paseo de la Reforma. Around the 1880s the city expanded west past Colonia Santa Maria de la Ribera, enveloping the areas where now are found the streets named Donato Guerra, Antonio Caso, Balderas, Chapultepec and Bucareli. Just beyond this, around 1887, there were still groves and cornfields; however, soon to be built were the streets named Roma, Milán, Lucerna, Dinamarca, Hamburgo, Londres, Berlín, Río Neva, Río Amazonas and Avenida de los Insurgentes, which form the heart of Colonia Juarez. Many of the new streets were named after European capitals, due to early resident and ex-consulate of Mexico Ricardo García Granado, for his children had been born in some of these cities as he performed his diplomatic duties.

Originally the area now known as Colonia Juárez consisted of four colonias established in the mid-19th century: Los Arquitectos, Bucareli, Del Paseo and Nuea del Paseos. Much of this area was lakebed that was in the process of drying up; in fact at the beginning of the 20th century, there were still gulleys with water in them, most of which were around what is now the Cuauhtemoc traffic circle. The four colonias would officially be unified in 1906, under the name of Colonia Benito Juárez García, but the area was unofficially known as Colonia Americana for some time before that.

At the end of the 19th century, this area became a favorite getaway for the wealthy elite of Mexico City, who began to build country houses here, to be close to the Chapultepec forest. Many foreigners also located here, due to the presence of a number of embassies. However, because these houses were built in an orderly fashion along straight streets, the area soon lost its country look. The city government initially tried to halt the development by the area but extending and raising property taxes, but it did not work. The area became the most exclusive in Mexico City, as wealthy families sought to create a European mode of living. The first residents of the new colonia were those who made their fortunes in land speculation, haciendas in other parts of Mexico, mines, banks, oil and railroads. Many of the buildings had French influence, which was popular at the time, which even included mansard roofs, despite the fact that it never snows here. Because many of the houses on Londres Street in the east part of the colonia had these mansard roofs, the area was popularly known as Colonia Limantour, for this and the presence of one of the most important people to live here, José Ives Limantour, the then Minister of Taxation. Prices for land in the colonia rose rapidly from 50 cents per unit in 1872 to $25 in 1903. This was one of the first residential areas of the city to have electricity. This allowed residents the luxury of staying up late, and began the area's reputation as a night spot, as residents went out for coffee and other socializing spaces nearby.

During the regime of Porfirio Díaz the area was filled with restaurants, cafes, bakeries and plazas, where people gathered to socialize during evenings and weekends. One early prominent location was the Hotel Emporio on Paseo de la Reforma, which had tea rooms and cafes, attracting some of the wealthiest families in the city; a similar one was the Hotel Imperial, which also had various stores. Both buildings still exist and the Emporio conserves most of its original facade. Another famous hotel was the Hotel Reforma. It was home to a bar called "Ciro's" during the 1940s and 1950s, where Pedro Infante began his career; María Félix visited and Agustín Lara gave concerts. It has since been demolished for redevelopment.

When the colonia was built, a large number of sculptures were added to the public areas, especially on Paseo de la Reforma. Lining both sides are statues honoring writers, political leaders, and others. One prominent sculpture is that of Cuauhtémoc, for which neighboring Colonia Cuauhtémoc was named. Another is a monument to Christopher Columbus, which was a gift from Antonio Escandon.

The most famous section of Colonia Juarez, Zona Rosa, began as development by Rafael Martínez de la Torre, which he envisioned as a satellite city away from Mexico City catering to the wealthy. At his death in 1882, the project stagnated until Salvador Malo acquired the rights to the area and participated in creating a district council for it. Work on developing this area faltered again until the early 20th century when the México City Improvement Company and the Chapultepec Land Improvement Company took over.

The Mexican Revolution brought the upscale and international community here to an end, as it represented the Porfirian era. Many of the houses here were abandoned and some, such as the one belonging to Francisco I. Madero, were burned during the Decena Trágica in 1913. After the war was over, a number of these mansions were appropriated by the government to house institutions such as the Secretary of Health, now Instituto Mexicano del Seguro Social. By the mid-20th century, the semi rural colonia was soon engulfed by the rapidly expanding city. Many of its first residents then moved to new neighborhoods such as Lomas de Chapultepec, Polanco and Colonia Del Valle. The older houses, especially in the Zona Rosa area, began to be converted into businesses. However, it still remained upscale with the wedding of Alex Berger to María Félix occurring at an Art Nouveau mansion at Londres #6 in 1956 (today the Wax Museum).

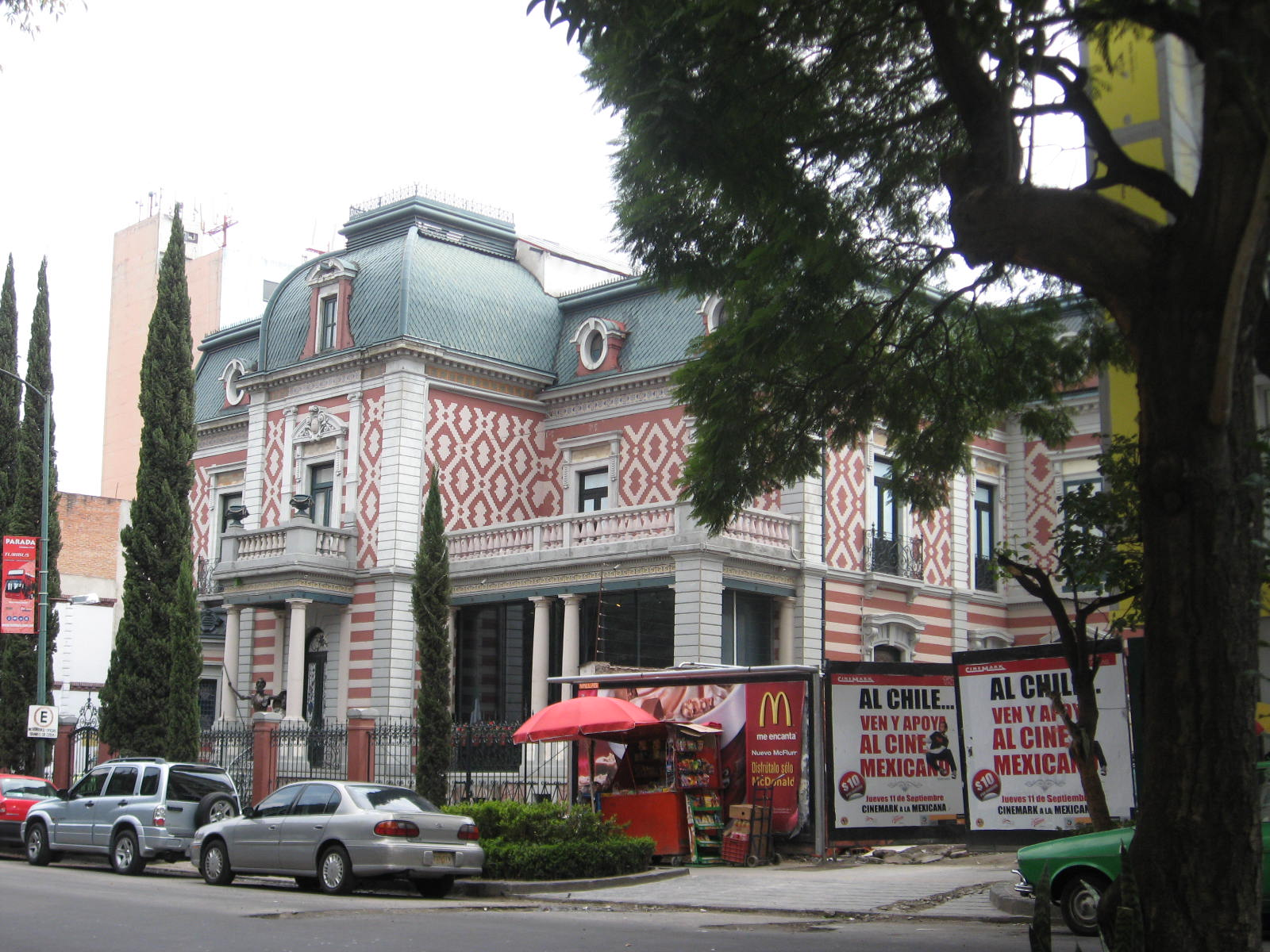
Porfirian-era mansion, today the Wax Museum

In the 1960s, artists and writers from the La Ruptura movement such as José Luis Cuevas, Carlos Monsiváis Aceves, Carlos Fuentes and José Agustín moved into the Zona Rosa area. This group gave the area its name because it was "too red to be white and too white to be red", meaning that it tolerated some vice but not too much. In 1967, Cuevas, in an act which was reported by various local stations, created a mural on a roof in Zona Rosa which he destroyed seconds after finishing it, as a protest against the social and political content of post-Revolution Mexican muralism.

The presence of artists and intellectuals in the area prompted the opening of bookstores and art galleries. The colonia hosted other names such as Guadalupe Amor, Manuel Felguérez, Lilia Carrillo, Alfonso Suarez del Real and Elena Poniatowski. These people brought a new wave in internationalism to the area and made the area popular with international tourists to Mexico City. This spurred more development in the way of restaurants, handcraft markets, antiques, nightclubs and more, not all of which was upscale. In the late 1980s into the 1990s, restaurants and bars displaced art galleries and other cultural establishments, but this did not diminish the area's popularity with tourists.

The Colonia retained its intellectual and artistic reputation from the 1960s to the late 1980s. However, the 1985 Mexico City earthquake damaged many buildings in the area and devastated some, such as Plaza Washington. This and a severe economic crisis started a process of deterioration, with many residents moving out. Street peddlers significantly increased in number, and many of the damaged structures became inhabited by squatters or were converted into tenements, with absentee landlords that did not bother to collect the long-frozen rents. Most of the stately homes still in good condition were converted into businesses such as nightclubs. Residents complain that infrastructure, especially lighting, has not been sufficiently maintained, leading to crime.

Until recently Zona Rosa has remained popular with tourists, although this has waned somewhat with the area's deterioration. Tourism has been both a blessing and a curse to the area. It has attracted big names, such as Paul McCartney, to stay there, but it has led to sites becoming damaged and vandalized. One major incident of this type when British soccer fans caused damage in 1985, leading to the destruction of the Calinda Geneve Hotel. Another was a more recent boycott of Jewish businesses by anti-Zionists.

Soon after their installation, the parking meters paid for major reconstruction work on Havre Street. Major sidewalk, pedestrian street and garden area reconstruction was undertaken in Zona Rosa in the mid-to-late first decade of the 21st century, after 20 years of no maintenance.

== Colonia Juárez today ==
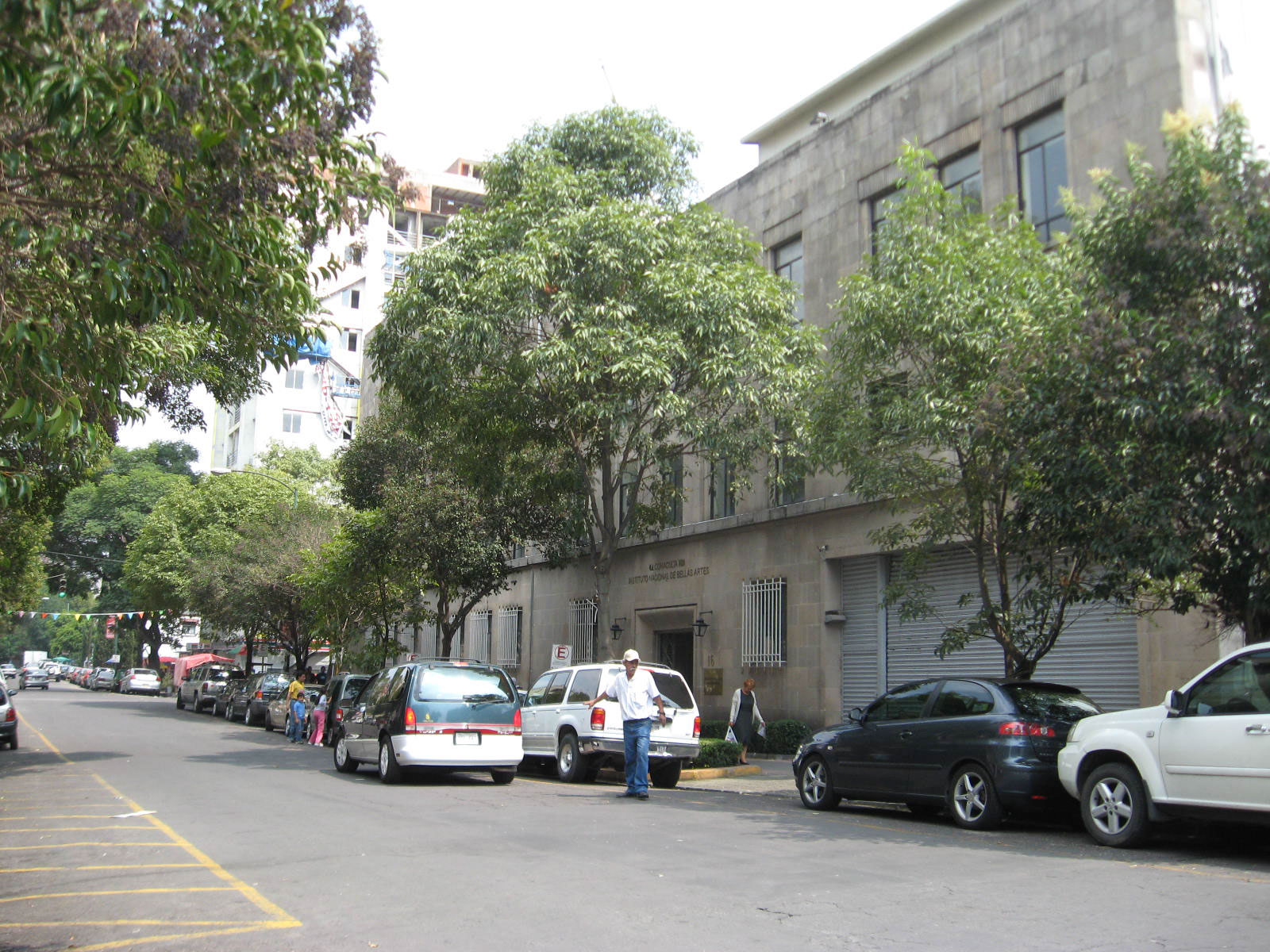
Luis Spota Art Education Center

Today the colonia, especially the Zona Rosa area, is a mix of wealth and poverty, old and new with many conflicting changes. New construction, most of it tall office and apartment buildings, is going up along Paseo de la Reforma, with predictions that this will return the area to its former prestige. In the interior, new boutiques, restaurants, bars and nightclubs continue to open. The deterioration process from the 1980s has been partially reverted by city efforts in conservation of older buildings and tourism promotion. The colonia has thirteen branches of banks that offer international services such as currency exchange. There are also several language schools, clothing stores, malls, a crafts mall, international cuisine, museums, art galleries and hotels. Shopping and hotel options range from the very expensive to the very affordable. The 240-room Four Seasons Hotel is the most upscale hotel and restaurant in the area. The Champs Elysees is a restaurant with more than 40 years in business, located on Paseo de la Reforma between Estocolmo and Amberes streets. Its specialty is French food such as foie gras and duck confit. It has hosted the families of a number of Mexican presidents. Some of the oldest and most exclusive restaurants include Focolare, founded in 1953, La Gondola, founded in 1958 and Passy, also founded in 1958. However, the area also hosts a large number of fast food restaurants such as McDonald's, Burger King, Dunkin' Donuts and Little Caesar's Pizza.

The colonia is one of the busiest in the city. Each day, 440,000 people enter the area to work, shop, wander around or visit the many restaurants and nightclubs in the 2,100 business and offices located here. Due to severe parking problems, 4,500 meters were installed in the colonia in 1998, which take in 8 million pesos each year. Sidewalks and sometimes streets are blocked by tables from restaurants and street vendors, making passage for the crowds difficult.

However, the area still has significant problems. It is not unusual to see limousines, young people in punk attire, foreign tourists, drug addicts, panhandlers, businesspeople and more all on the same street. The population of the colonia declined from the 1980s, to under 9,000 people at the beginning of the 21st century. Neighborhood leaders claim that the deterioration of businesses, especially the proliferation of men's clubs and infrastructure is the cause. Some of the businesses that have been targeted as causing problems include La Michelada, El Keops, El Manhattan and El Pecado. In addition, street peddlers block sidewalks and streets; this issue is most problematic on Londres, Hamburgo, Abraham Gonzalez, Toledo and Liverpool streets. Many street vendors now have permanent stands. Some residents also complain about auto part stores on Abraham Gonzalez, Barcelona and Versalles streets. Street vendors have been removed from streets on occasion, but eventually they return.

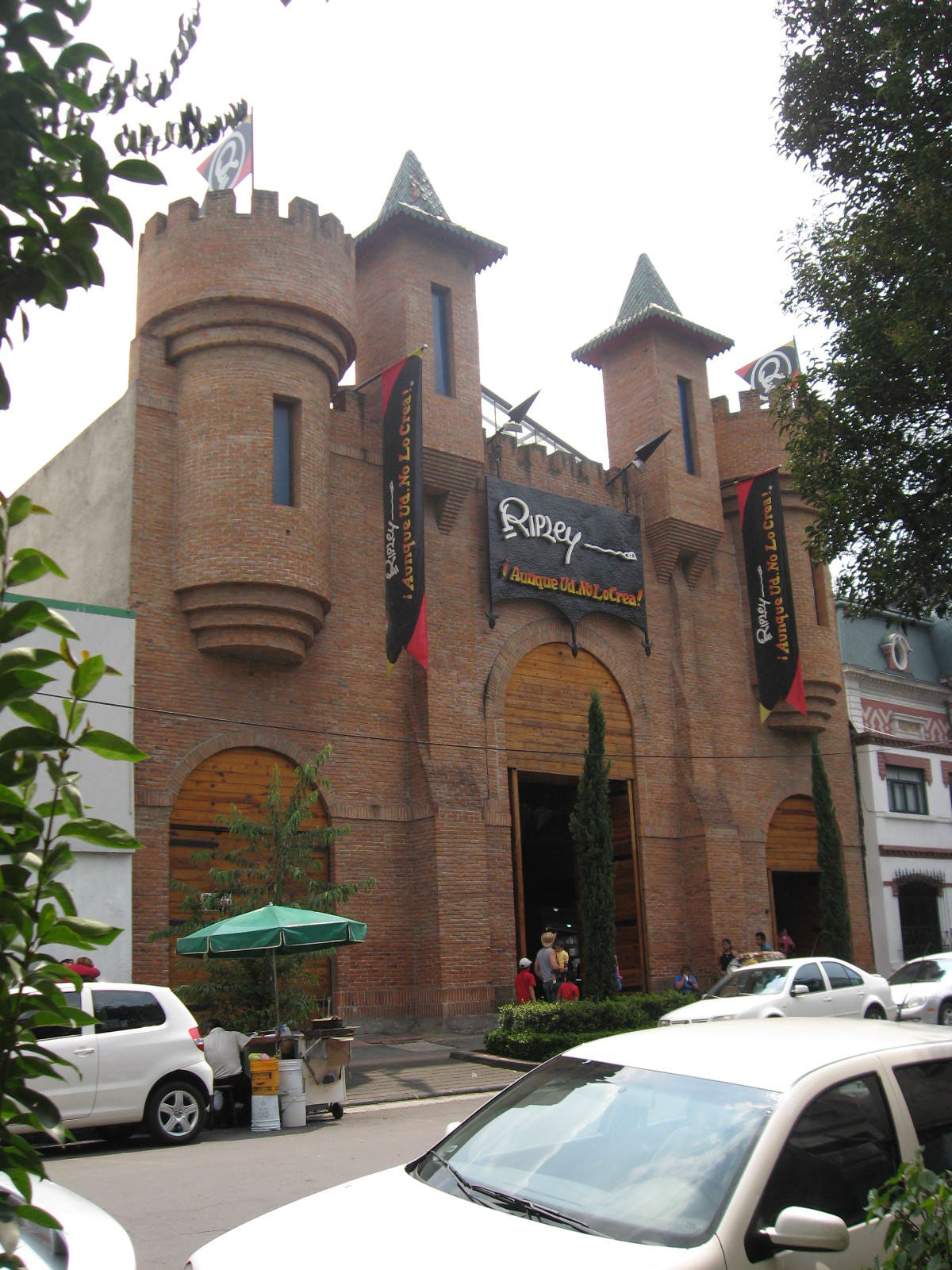
Ripley's Believe it or Not Museum

The colonia has 99 blocks, many with historical buildings, but only five blocks have buildings which have been renovated and preserved. Some of the abandoned buildings include the former headquarters of the Cuauhtémoc borough, and have been invaded by squatters since the 1960s and 1970s. In the first decade of the 21st century, the borough neglected much of the repair and maintenance work in the area, forcing the Comité Vecinal de la Colonia Juárez (the neighborhood committee) and the Asociación de Comerciantes de la Zona Rosa (local business association) to take over former city services such as repairing sidewalks, changing lights, maintaining green areas and trash bins. Much of this is paid for with income from local parking meters. Since the 1990s tourism has fallen in the area, mostly due to petty crime and "hooligans". Crime problems have lowered hotel residency rates. The Nuestra Señora del Sagrado Corazón is located on the corner of Genova and Paseo de la Reforma. It suffered two thefts of religious images, one of Saint Charbel and the other called the "Virgen del Cobre" (Copper Virgin) in 2008. Male prostitution began in the area in 1995 and is mostly located on Hamburgo and Varsovia streets. Female prostitution is located mostly in three houses located on Dublin, Hamburgo and Chapultepec streets. Small-scale drug trafficking is common, with merchandise hidden in telephone booths, garden areas and street vendor stalls. It is often advertised by people passing out flyers with the names of non-existent businesses in the State of Mexico. To combat crimes such as muggings, a special squad of "tourist police" now patrol the area, especially on less-travelled streets such as Praga, Toledo and Burdeos.

The divide between rich and poor can be seen in areas such as Atenas Street. Here, next to the Palacio de Covian, the site of the Secretary of the Government, there is a building damaged by the 1985 earthquake in which nine families live illegally. These families do not pay rent and the owner wants to evict them. These families earn money by selling crafts on the sidewalks in the colonia or by washing clothes. Some families who live on the streets of the area survive on 20 pesos per day.

In many locations, the inability to recover from the events of the 1980s can still be seen. One building nearly in ruins from the 1985 earthquake stands on Praga Street on the corner of Chapultepec; another is on Londres Street near the Museo de Cera. On Amberes Street, between Londres and Liverpool, there are a number of tenements, which are not maintained and owners do not bother to collect the tenants’ frozen rents. New construction, especially along Paseo de la Reforma, continues the trend of change of use from residential to commercial, with fifty-one of its 99 blocks having been urbanized. This construction is raising the reputation of the area once again, with hopes of returning its prestige.

== Architecture and landmarks ==
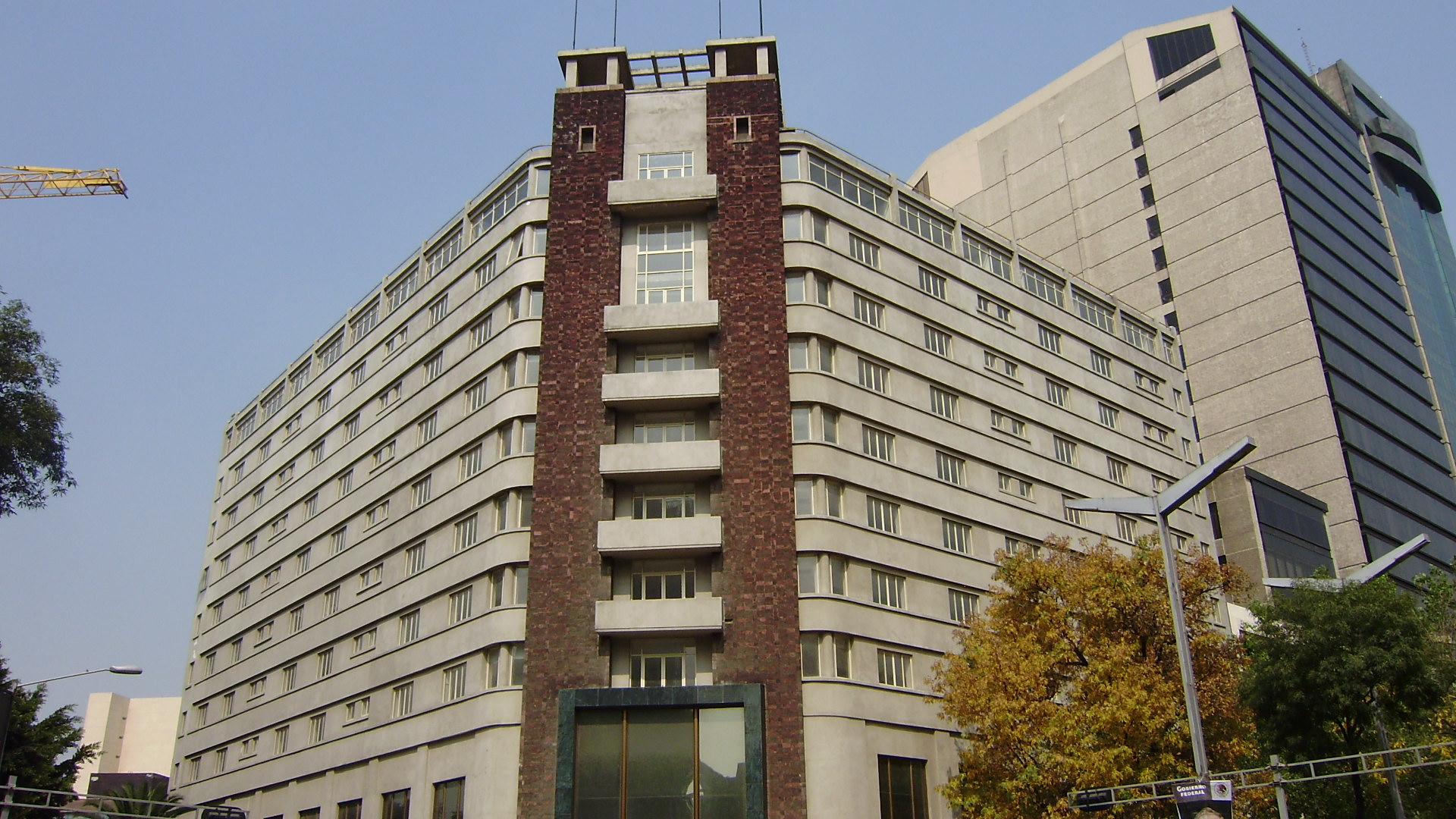
Hotel Reforma built by Mario Pani

The colonia is home to a number of architectural styles which date from between the 19th and 20th centuries to the present. Most of the finer mansions are located on the east side of the colonia, with a few on Paseo de la Reforma. A number of styles can be seen on Havre Street and the area around Giodano Bruno Plaza. The oldest structures date to the founding of the colonia. Decorative features of these homes include large stairways, multiple levels, tall windows and elements of French design, mostly based on the Baroque of Louis XIII, Louis XIV and Louis XV, including mascarons, crests and floral designs. Many have facades of tezontle, gray sandstone and even marble. The interiors generally had pastel colors and gilded accents similar to those of pre-Revolution France. Many of these houses were built by European-trained architects. mostly inspired by French and Italian designs, with occasional English influence. The streets here are wider than many others in the city. A number of former mansions and other structures from the area's early history continue to exist, some, such as those on Berlin and Versalles Streets are well preserved. Others such as Versalles 52, is filled with squatters and still others contain businesses such as the funeral home at Versalles 50. Originally this funeral home was a country villa whose architecture was inspired by that of Renaissance Italy and France. The building features intricate glasswork, a tile roof, cornices, balconies and reliefs on the doors. Next to this is another villa which houses a bar called La Tirana and a discothèque called La Estacion. In both these buildings, the original interiors are gone, but the facades remain. Another well preserved area is the "Colonia del Buen Tono" area defined by Bucareli, Turin, Abraham Gonzalez and Barcelona streets, where businessman Ernesto Pugibet, "the Carlos Slim of his era', built housing for his employees in accordance to his religious beliefs. This housing complex is divided only by three private and quiet streets called Calle Mascota, Calle Ideal and Calle Gardenia, in contrast to the streets that surround the area. The twin museums of Ripley's and Museo de Cera are located on Londres Street. The Museo de Cero or Wax Museum is housed in a mansion designed by Antonio Rivas Mercado, who also designed the Angel of Independence monument on Paseo de la Reforma. The Ripley's Museum (Museo Ripley's "Aunque usted no lo crea!")in Mexico City houses 300 rarities from among the collection of such its founder, Robert Ripley, collected during twenty years of his life. These include wine made infused with rat fetuses (Tianshuzaichiew), a sculpture of the tallest man in the world (Robert Wadlow) photographs of people and other artifacts. The Mexico City branch of the museum was established in 1992 in a structure shaped like a medieval castle and is one of 17 such museums in the world, but the only in Latin America. The museum is located at Londres #4 and #6. It is joined with the Museo de la Cera.

On Londres Street is an abandoned mansion which served as the embassy of the Spanish Republican government during the Spanish Civil War. When Mexico became the only nation to continue recognizing the Republican government, it became the headquarters for the government-in-exile. Next to it is the Sagrado Corazon de Jesus Church, built by the Hungarian immigrant community on Plaza Giordano Bruno, in which the aristocracy of the late 19th and early 20th centuries attended mass.

The house of Francisco I. Madero was at Liverpool 25 on the corner with Berlin. The house was burned by Victoriano Huerta after he took power during the Decena Trágica in 1913. It is a narrow building with a pitched roof. There is a plaque on the buildings to commemorate the event. Other notable sites in the area include the Benjamin Franklin Library, and the Mexican Social Security Institute (IMSS) building.

== Economy ==
The telecommunications company Cablemás and the airline Magnicharters have their headquarters in Colonia Juárez.

== Zona Rosa ==
The Zona Rosa area began as a subdivision for the wealthy in the late 19th century located on the far west side of what is now Colonia Juárez. Today, Zona Rosa comprises 24 of the colonia's 99 city blocks, and shares the rest of the area's architecture and streets named after European cities. The area received its current name from artist José Luis Cuevas in the 1960s, who declared that it was "too fearful to be a red zone" (a zona roja or red zone in Spanish is an area were vices such as prostitution, alcohol and drugs are tolerated). While the area was dominated by upscale boutique and galleries until the 1980s, since then many of these businesses have given way to men's clubs, gay bars and nightclubs, massage parlors, making the area a truly "red zone". However, businesses of all types, from upscale boutiques and antique shops to fast food restaurants all exist here. The area has 714 businesses, 137 of which are restaurants with 100,000 people per day passing through.

One prominent street is Genova Street, a pedestrian mall lined with eateries, 13 of which own areas on the street on which to put tables. Here, dozens of people handing out flyers stop pedestrians and drivers advertising gay bars and men's clubs, some of which operate illegally. It is also the site of the Corridor de Arte José Luis Cuevas, which occurs on weekends when an average of forty artists display their works for sale. On this street area around forty sculptures created by young artists of the Escuela Nacional de Artes Plasticas of UNAM. This effort was partially sponsored by the Rotary Club of Zona Rosa.

=== Gayborhood ===
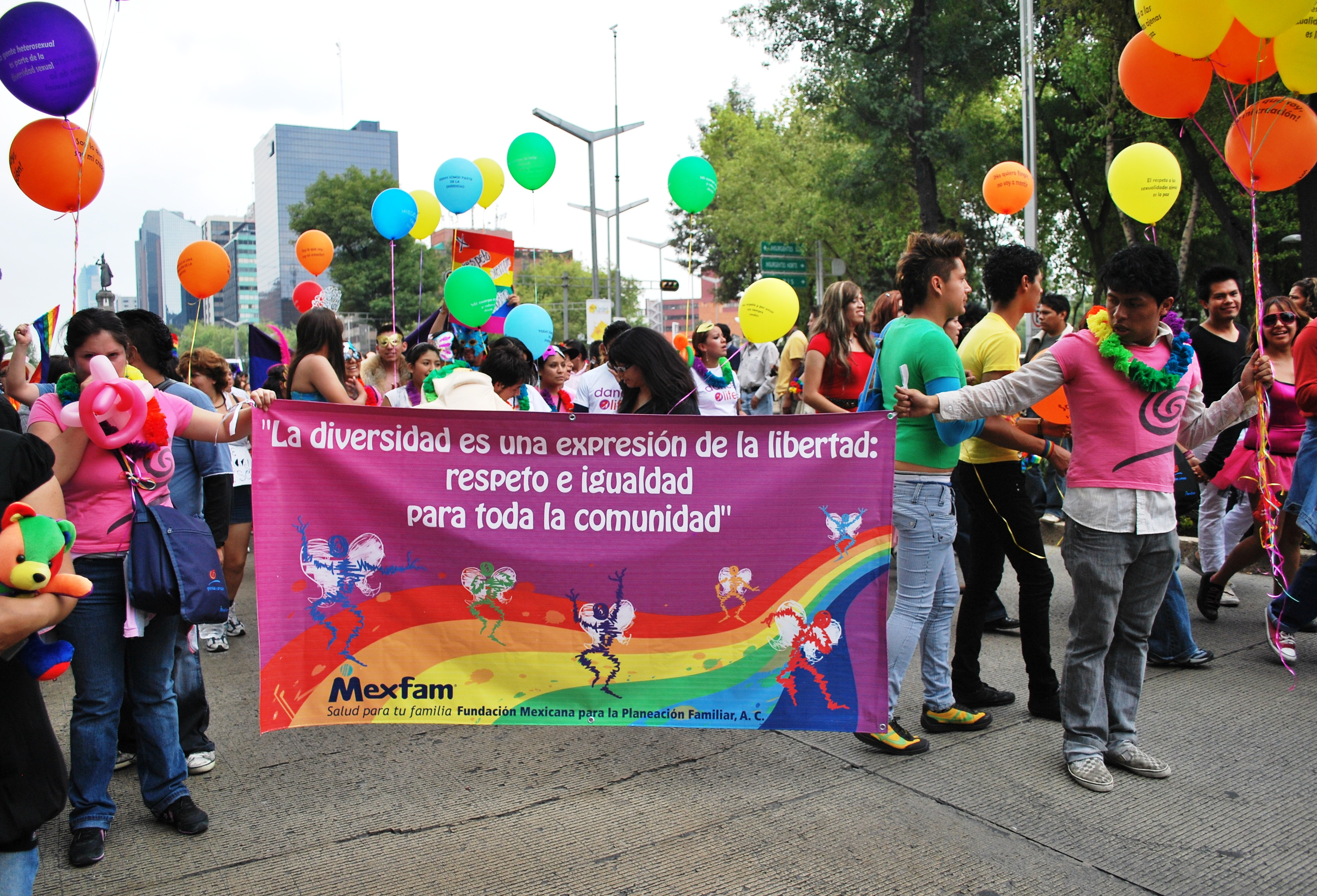
Marchers at the 2009 Gay Pride Parade

Another prominent area is Amberes Street, home to Mexico City's gay community. Homosexuality on this street and the rest of Zona Rosa is fairly open with hand holding and kissing among same-sex couples. During Gay Pride, the nightclubs, discothèques and bars of Zona Rosa fill with members of the LGBT community starting at midday. Many businesses, whether they cater to gay people or not, decorate with rainbow colored balloons, streamers and other items. Despite the crowds police presence is not significantly heightened. The parade marches along Paseo de la Reforma from Puerta de los Leones to the Glorieta de la Palma, with the entire stretch completely closed to traffic for the event. The city have even participated offering free AIDS tests to attendees. However, not all residents and business owners are happy with the area's gay reputation. Some business owners complain that open displays of affection drives away tourists and other visitors. While male and female prostitution exists in Zona Rosa, there have been complaints of the prostitution of minors, despite efforts since the 1990s to eradicate it. However, some in the gay community state that the prostitution of minors is not the issue that neighbors say it is, rather, the problem some have is that there is a gay community here.

In 2005, the city created the Reforma-Centro Historico tourist route to connect the two areas; Zona Rosa and the historic center, and increase tourism in both.

=== French Quarter ===
The area from Insurgentes Avenue towards the historic center is the home of the historic French community. Havre Street is the heart of the community. The French community in Mexico City began in the historic center where French nationals went to live in the top floors of the French department stores like El Palacio de Hierro, El Puerto de Liverpool and Al Puerto de Veracruz, where they have the French Post Office and Farmacias Paris. They later moved to El Buen Tono near Chinatown and the old Spanish neighborhood on Lopez Street. When they became an economic powerhouse, especially Alsatians and Barcelonettes, they moved into the streets around the neighborhood with Second Empire mansions that reminded them of Parisian buildings. Today many French establishments still reside here, and the French community still congregates here.

=== Koreatown ===
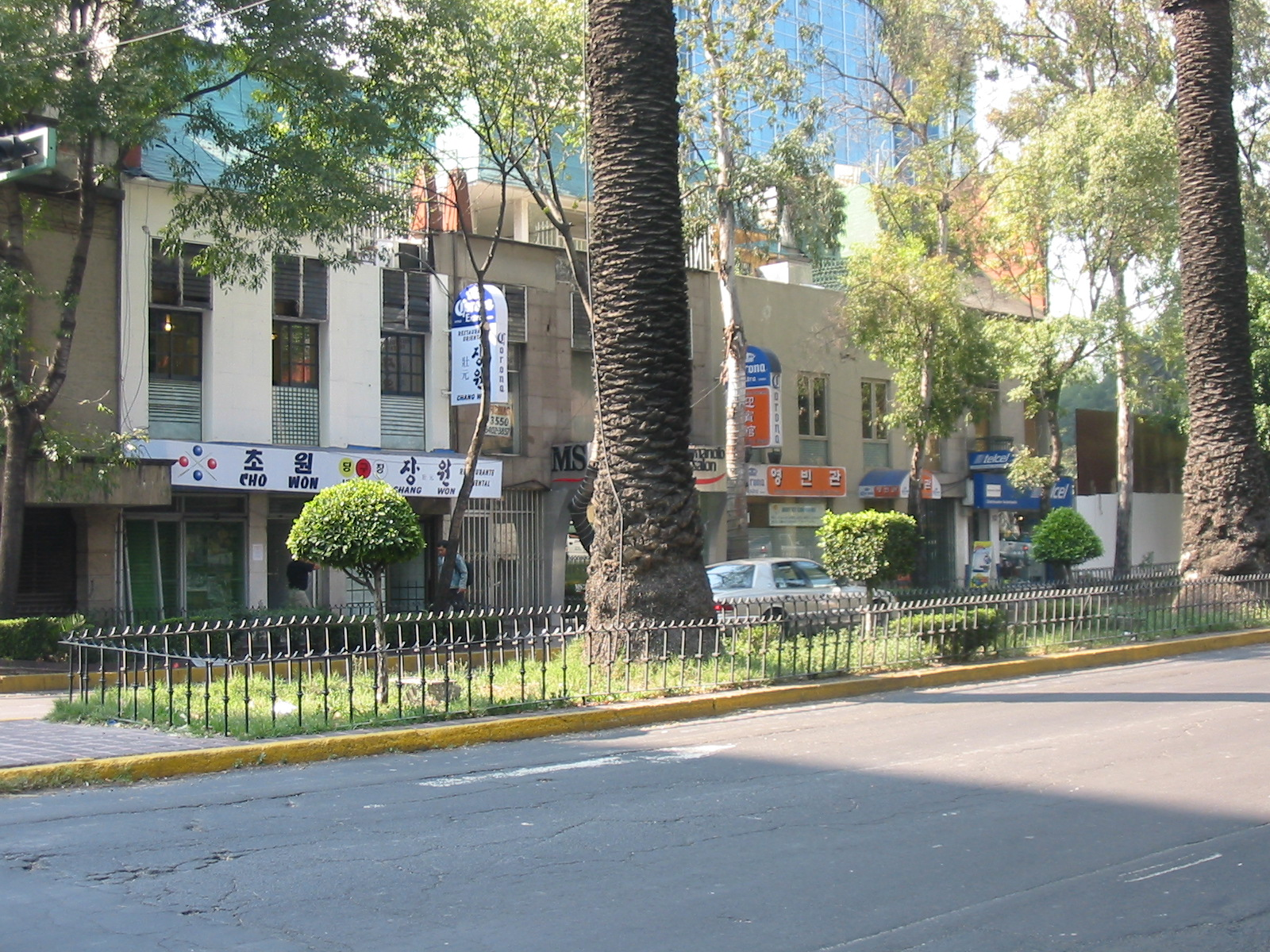
Korean businesses on Florencia Street

There are an estimated 9,000 Korean nationals living in Mexico City. Most immigrated to Mexico in the 1990s and first decade of the 21st century, as a result of commercial agreements signed by the Mexican government and those of Korea and Taiwan, allowing companies such as Daewoo to bring workers over from Asia. However, according to some sources, such as Alfredo Romero, professor of the Faculty of Political and Social Sciences at UNAM, a large percentage of Koreans living in Mexico have questionable immigration status.

Most of Mexico City's Korean population lives in and around Zona Rosa. According to the newspaper Reforma, there are at least 1,000 Koreans living in Zona Rosa and about 3,000 total in Colonia Juárez. Many Korean residents do not speak Spanish and are relatively isolated from their Mexican neighbors. The area around Hamburgo, Praga, Berna and Biarritz streets has become known as “Pequeño Seúl,” or Little Seoul; Biarritz Street is now almost 90% Korean. The number of Korean residents in the colonia continues to increase even as the number of younger people in general decreases.

Most Koreans are business owners with establishments such as restaurants, video rental places, bars and saunas, many of which cater exclusively to the Korean population, with signs and menus in Korean. There have been conflicts between Korean-owned businesses and Mexican neighbors over noise and sanitation issues, with some Mexicans complaining that the Koreans do not want to adapt to Mexican society. Another issue has been legal problems, both with the status of merchandise and the status of employees. A store owned by Koreans was shut down by police for selling imported merchandise of questionable origin in 2002, with 33 workers detained.

== Education ==
The private school Colegio Franco Español, established in 1936, originally was at 99 Paseo de la Reforma in this colonia. It is now located in Tlalpan.

== Transportation ==
=== Public transportation ===
The area is served by the Mexico City Metro, Metrobús and EcoBici bikeshare, that has two stations in the neighborhood.

Metro stations

- Sevilla
- Cuauhtémoc
- Insurgentes

Metrobus stations

- Hamburgo
- Glorieta Insurgentes
