= Chapultepec aqueduct =

Structure in Mexico City, Mexico

Coordinates: 19°25′20.9″N 99°10′4.93″W

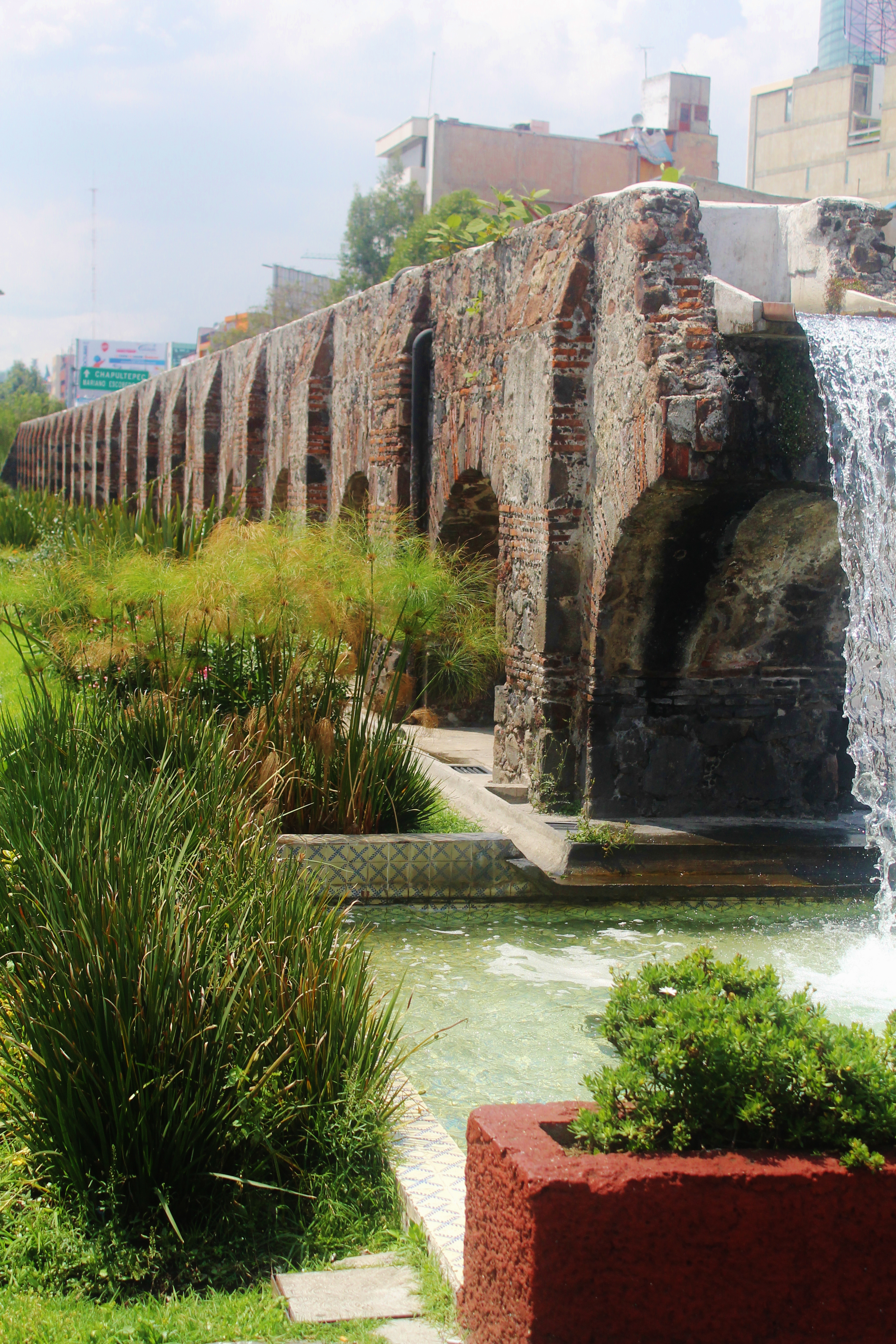
View of remaining arches of the Spanish built Chapultepec Aqueduct

The Chapultepec aqueduct (in Spanish: acueducto de Chapultepec) was built to provide potable water to Tenochtitlan, now known as Mexico City. Tenochtitlan was the capital of the Triple Aztec Alliance empire (formed in 1428 and ruled by the Mexica, the empire joined the three Nahua states of Tenochtitlan, Tetzcoco, and Tlacopan). This fresh water was transported from the Chapultepec springs. Two aqueducts following the same route from the springs were built by the Aztecs during the 15th century, the first destroyed by flooding and the second by the Spanish. After the Spanish conquest a colonial aqueduct was built, the ruins of which are located near Metro Sevilla.

== Original Chapultepec aqueduct ==
The water level under Tenochtitlan was 10–11 feet below the city. However, it was not a viable source of freshwater as the water retrieved was brackish. Shallow wells were constructed, and the water retrieved was used for household work. Construction of an aqueduct that brought fresh water, suitable for cooking and drinking, from Chapultepec springs to Tenochtitlan began in 1418. Building relied on mud and plant material to create the foundation, which rested on artificial islands that were spread 3 to 4 meters apart. Mounds consisting of mud were constructed on these islands and driven through with a wooden stake for support. The top of each mound had a hollowed out trough lined with compacted clay, and hollowed out logs were placed in the bottom of the flow path to bridge gaps between the islands. A wooden plank walkway flanked the aqueduct, making it easily accessible and a method of transportation from the city to the outlying areas. Once the water reached the city, it was delivered to small reservoirs and select households through a network of canals that extended in the four cardinal directions and branched off to individual streets.

Despite its relative longevity, the composition of the aqueduct could not withstand the forces of nature. Erosion weathered away the compacted clay, and in 1449, heavy rains triggered a flood that destroyed the aqueduct and effectively shut down Tenochtitlan for weeks.

== Second Chapultepec aqueduct ==
After the destruction of the original aqueduct, the king of Texcoco, Nezahualcoyotl, ordered the construction of another water system using sturdier materials following the same route as the original. This aqueduct consisted of two mortar lined troughs made of stone masonry. The addition of the second trough allowed for water to be diverted to the second pipe when maintenance had to be performed on the other. This allowed for a continuous supply of fresh water to be delivered to the city. Like the original aqueduct, the second rested on a chain of artificial islands. The pipes were secured to the islands by wood pilings attached to a foundation of sand, lime, and rock. The aqueduct was constructed using wood, carved stone, and compacted soil, with portions made of hollowed logs, allowing canoes to travel underneath.

== Colonial aqueduct ==
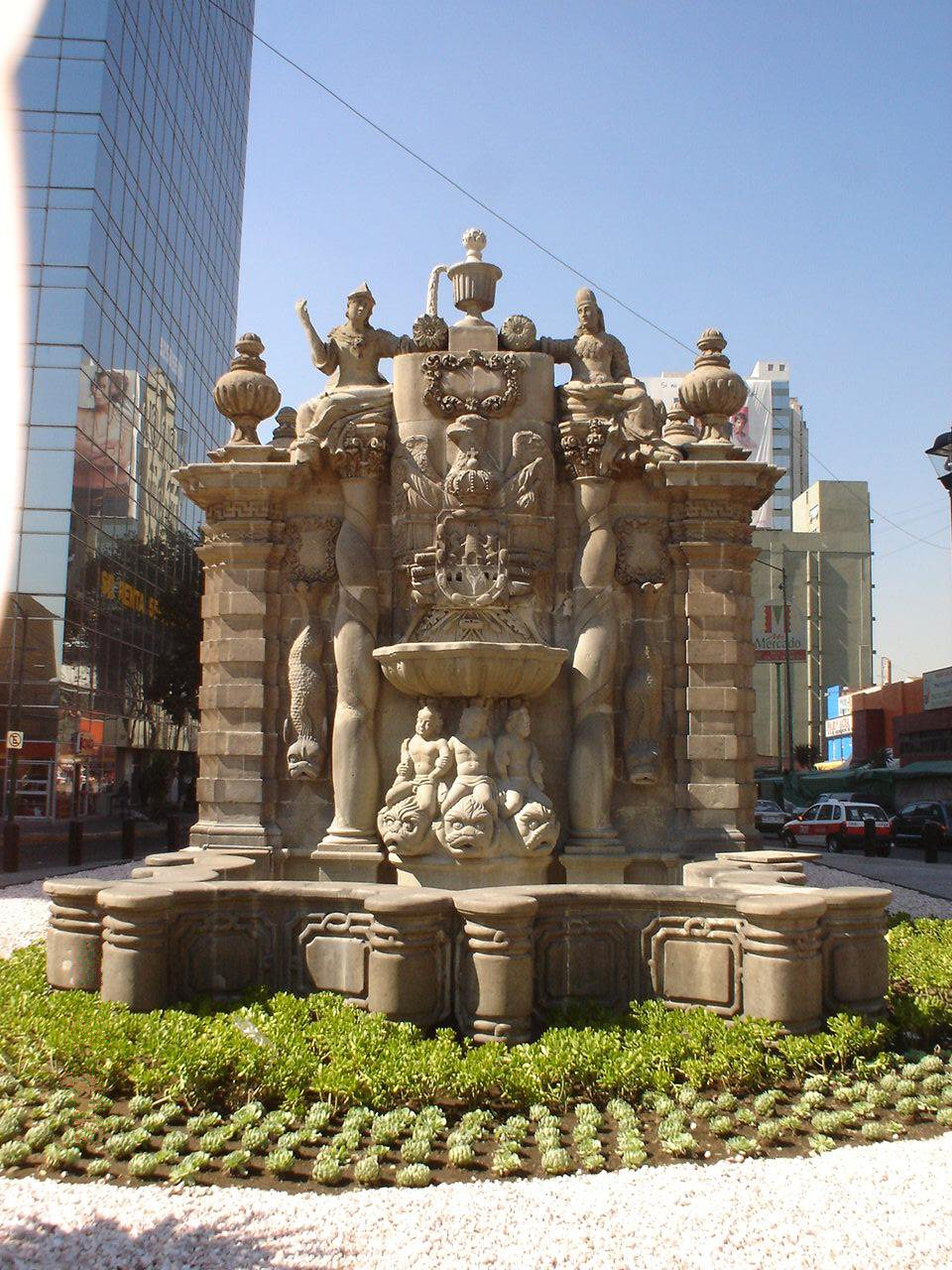
Replica of the Salto del Agua Fountain.

After his arrival in the Aztec empire, Hernán Cortés discovered the economic and political importance of the Chapultepec aqueduct. He took advantage of the city's dependence on the aqueduct and blocked the fresh water supply, eventually destroying it. Shortly after the Spanish conquest, he set about dividing the land among the conquistadors. He wanted to take the forest of Chapultepec for himself, but Charles V, King of Spain, denied his request and decreed that the springs were needed to provide the people with potable water and were thereby the property of the city of Tenochtitlan. Construction of a new aqueduct started under the reigning Viceroy Fernando de Alencastre, 1st Duke of Linares (1711–1716). The structure became known under another name as the Aqueduct of Belen, named after an old Belen convent it passed by. Built along the same path as the Aztec engineered aqueducts, it was constructed using Roman architecture, reflected in its 904 arches. In completion, it reached a total length of 4663 varas, roughly 4 kilometers. In conquest times, the aqueduct supplied the city with the majority of its freshwater, however, waterborne illness was a concern. In an effort to reduce the possibility of external contamination, iron and lead pipes were installed to replace the open troughs during the 19th Century. These shielded the water from air and outside contaminants but did not decrease the number of pathogen related illnesses and death.

Located on Chapultepec Avenue near Metro Sevilla, a small section, about twenty-two arches long, still survives today. Also standing today are two fountains associated with the aqueduct. The first is found wedged between Chapultepec Park and Metro Chapultepec. Constructed by the viceroy Agustín de Ahumada, this fountain was designed to divert a water to this section of the city. It also served a decorative and historical purpose. However, it is no longer in its original location: it was restored, enlarged and moved to its current location by Roberto Alvarez Espinoza in 1921. This fountain's original place was in the Chapultepec Forest. The second fountain, Salto del Agua, was built at the intersection of Eje Central and Arcos de Belen Street, where the historic center meets Colonia Doctores and Colonia Obrera. While it is at the original location, it is not the original fountain. It had deteriorated badly, and a reproduction was made by Guillermo Ruiz. The original is on display at the Museo Nacional del Virreinato in Tepotzotlán. There was a 3rd fountain as faraway as La Merced on the other side of the Centro Histórico but this one was entirely demolished at the end of the 19th century.

== Historical images of the Aqueduct and Salto del Agua Fountain ==
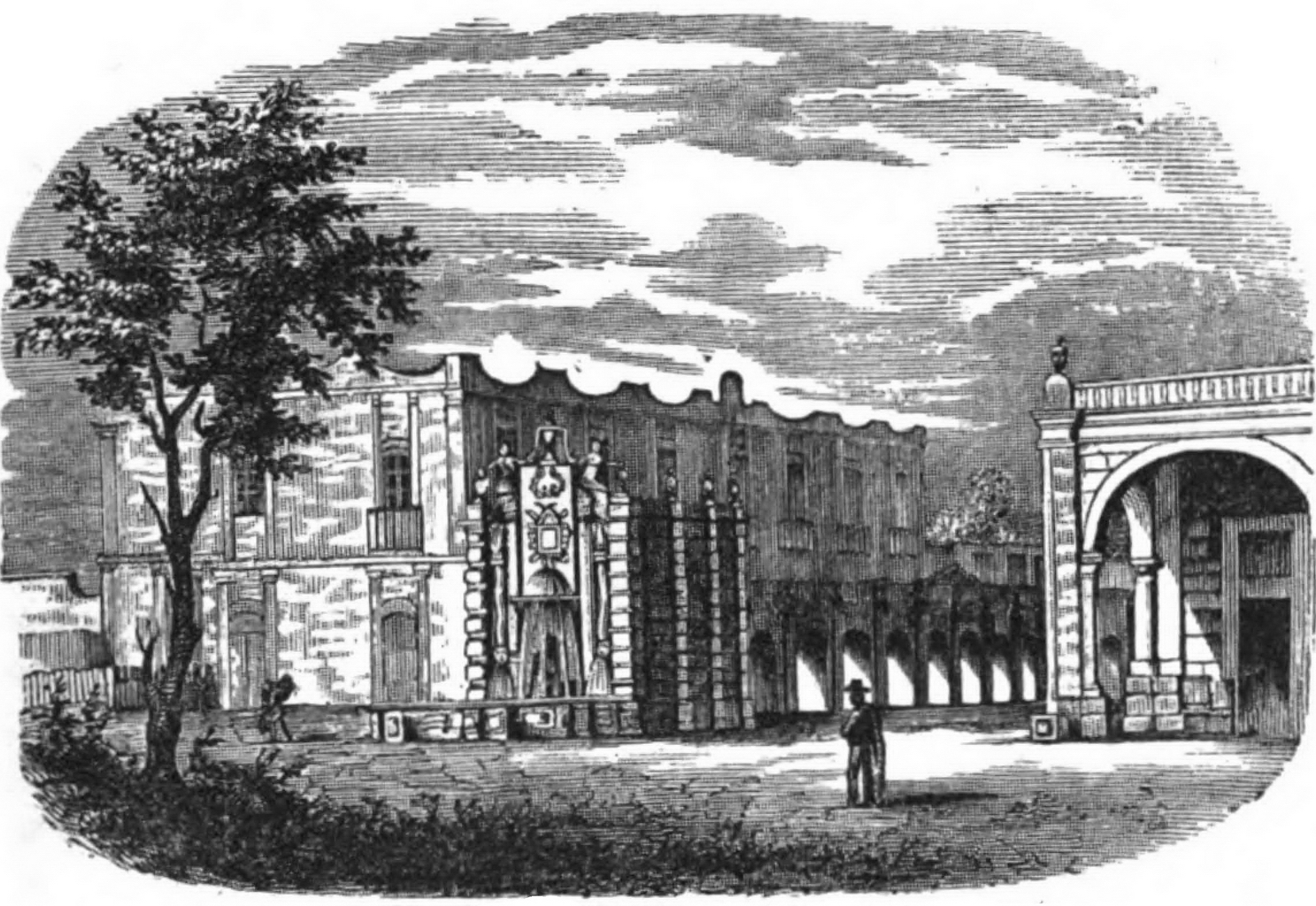
Termination of the Aqueduct, painting of 1844 by Brantz Mayer.

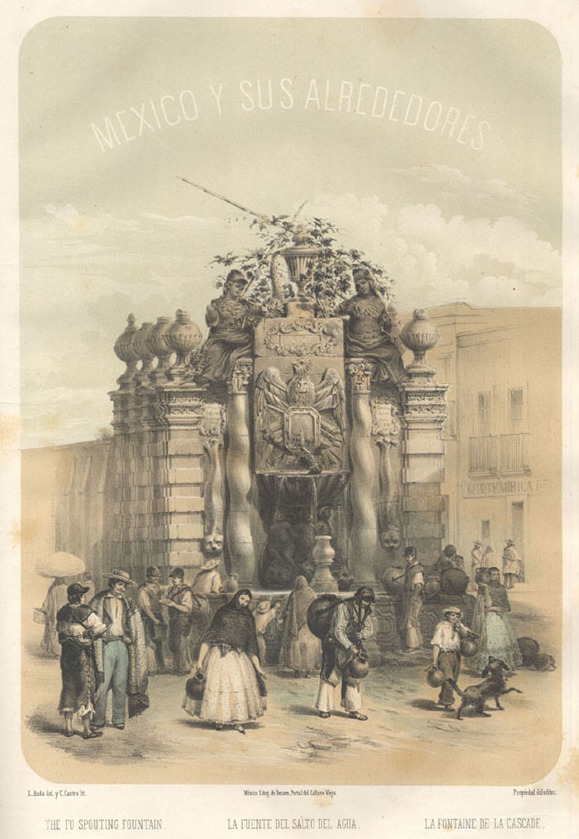
Salto del Agua Fountain in a painting of 1855 by Casimiro Castro.

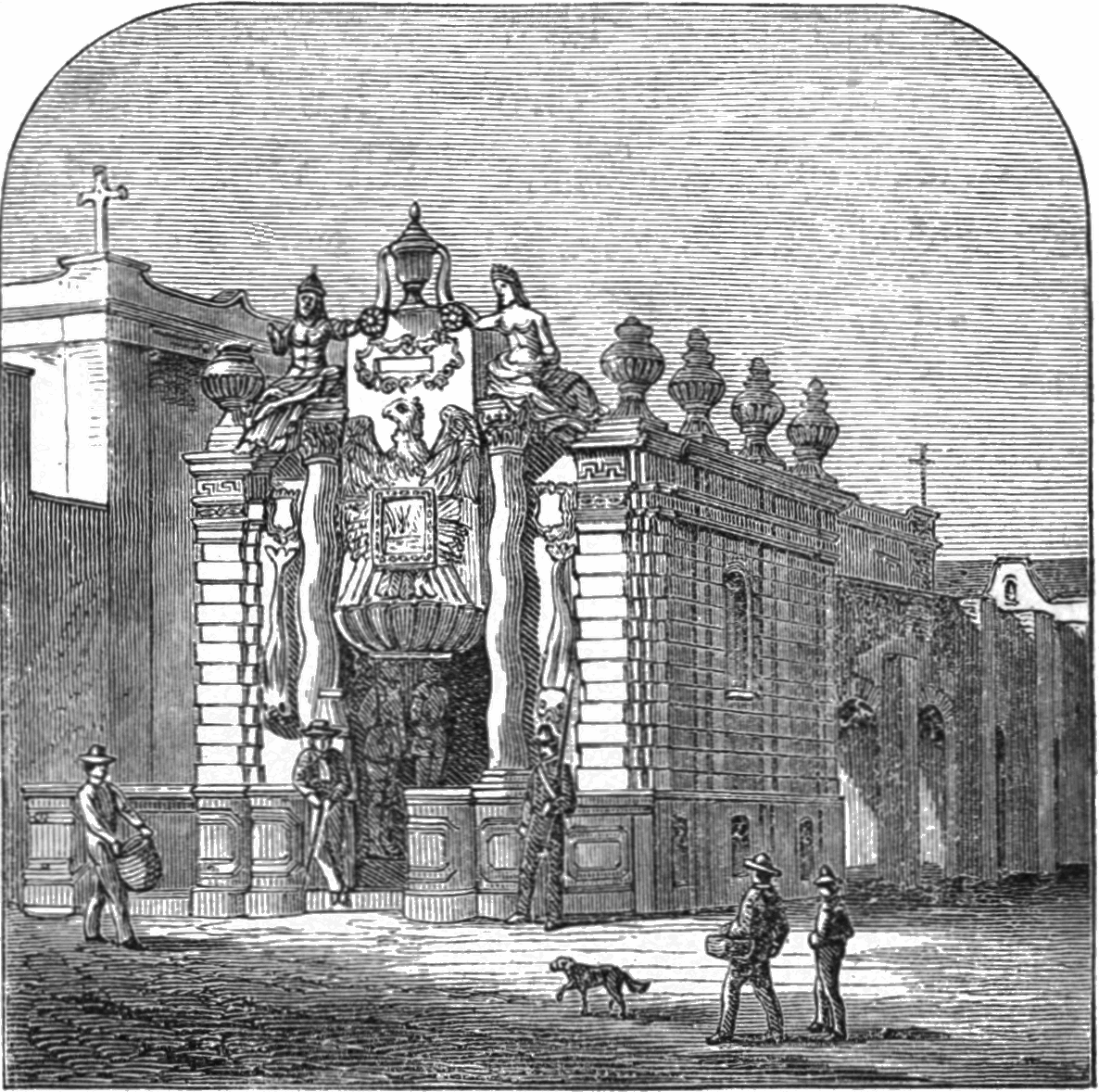
Salto de Agua Fountain (ending the Aqueduct), painting of 1870 by Albert S. Evans.

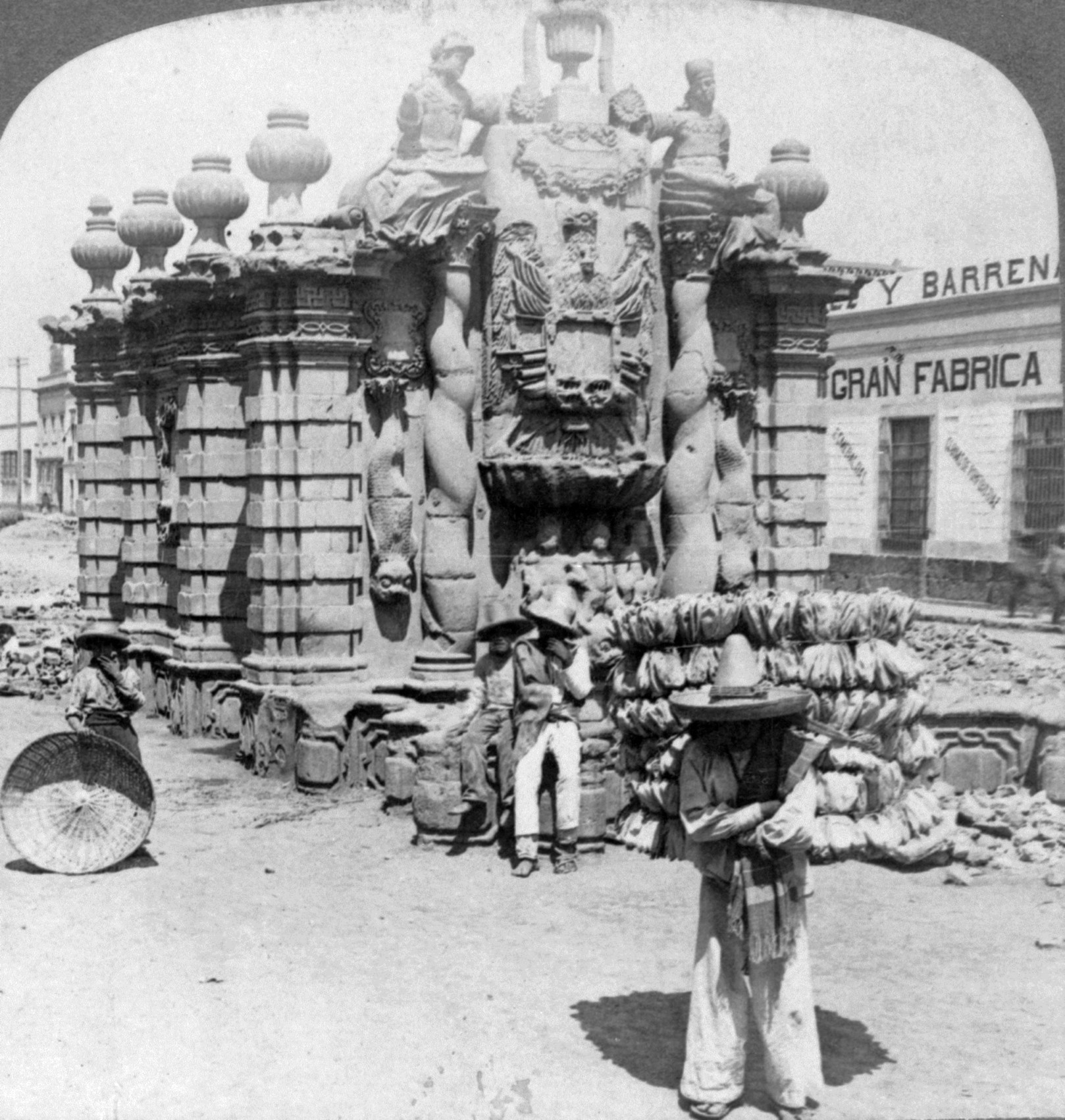
Salto del Agua Fountain in 1903. Library of Congress.

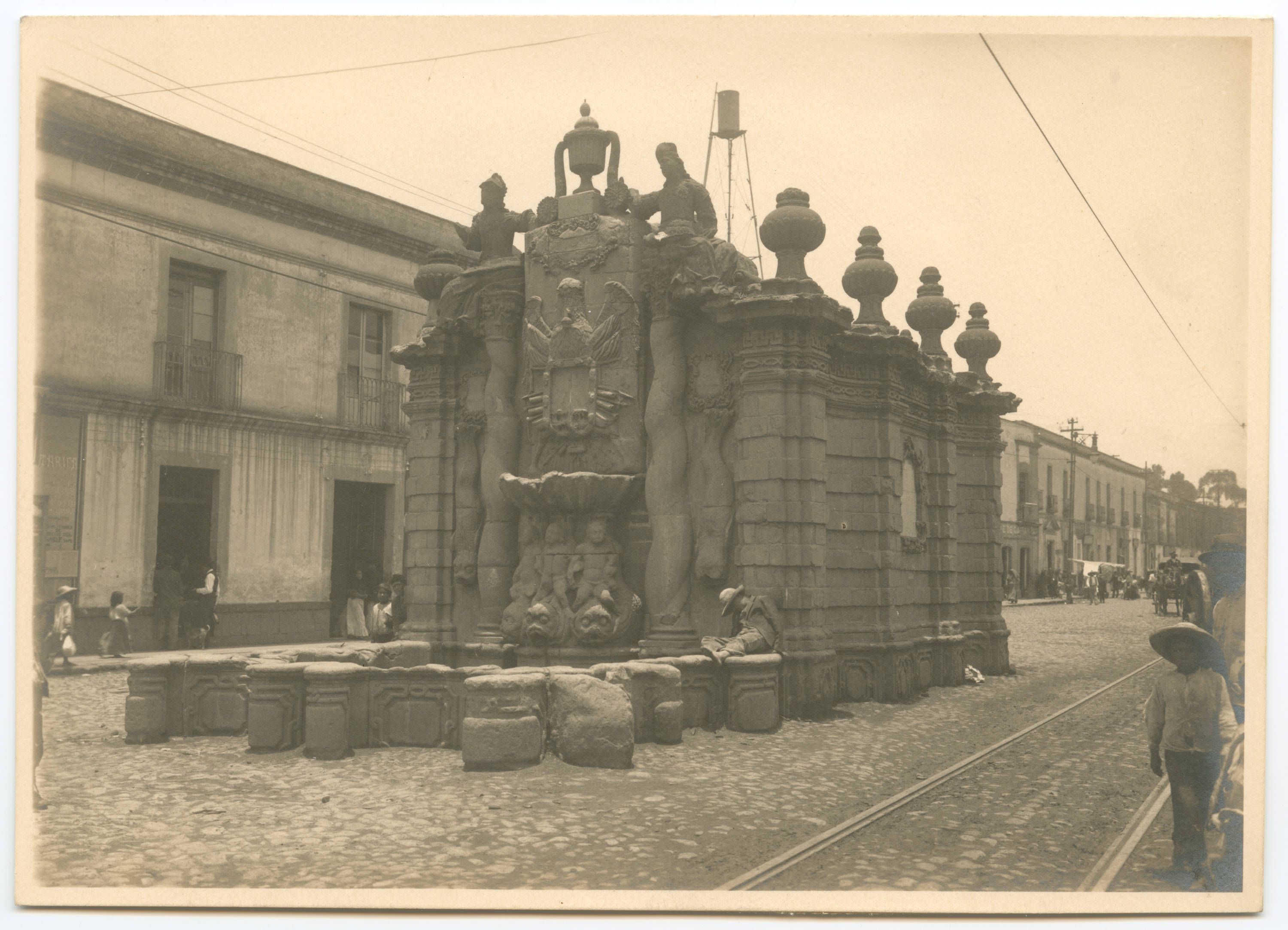
Salto del Agua Fountain in 1920 by Hugo Brehme.

== See also ==
- Chapultepec
