= Sevilla metro station (Mexico City) =

Mexico City metro station

Sevilla
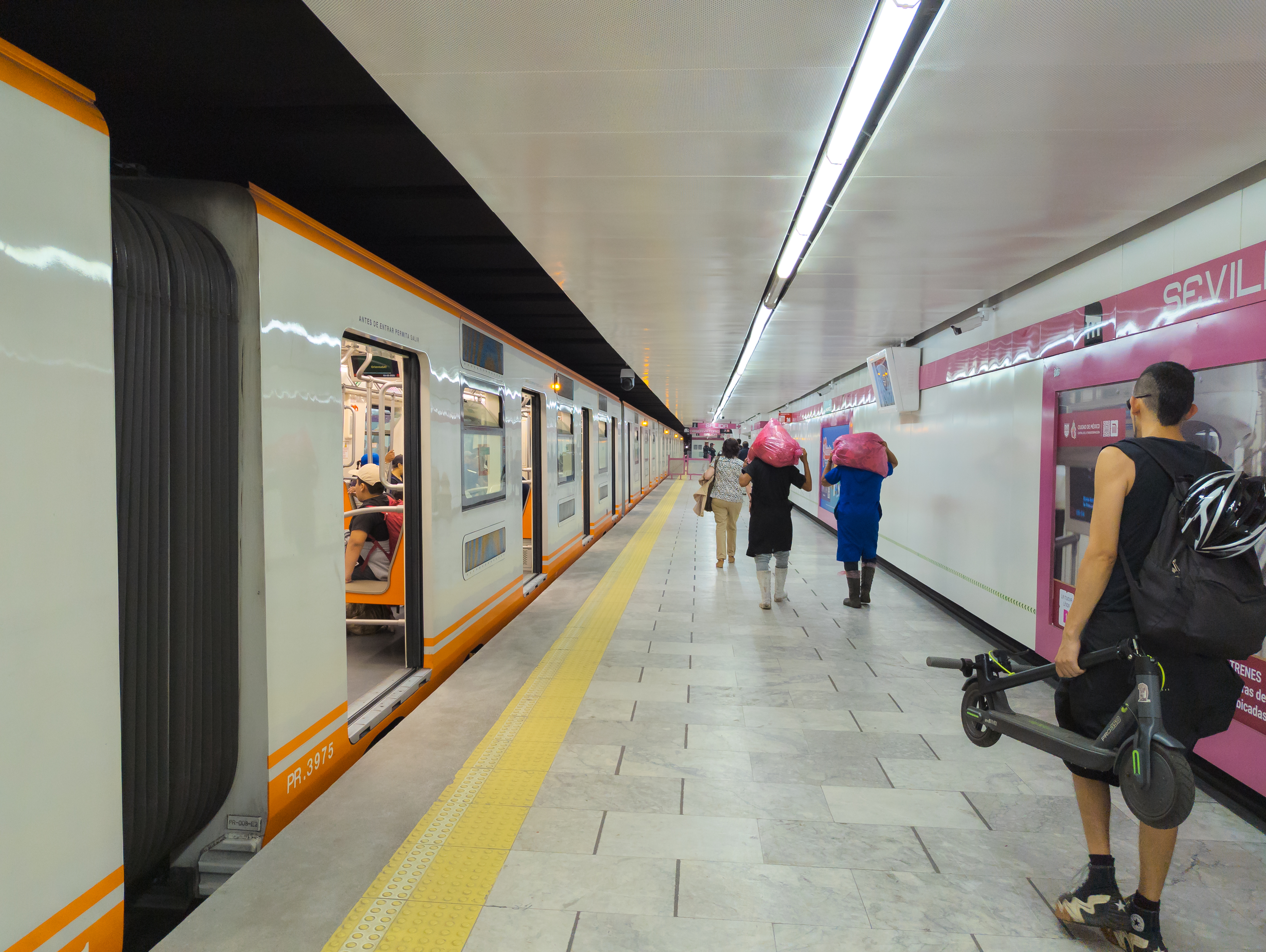
- Station platform as of May 2025

General information
- Location: Avenida Chapultepec; Cuauhtémoc; Mexico City; Mexico
- Coordinates: 19.421916°N 99.17058°W
- System: Mexico City Metro
- Operator: Sistema de Transporte Colectivo (STC)
- Platforms: 2 side platforms
- Tracks: 2
- Connections: Sevilla stop (temporary)

Construction
- Structure type: Underground
- Platform levels: 1
- Parking: No
- Cycle facilities: Yes
- Accessible: Yes

Other information
- Status: In service

History
- Opened: 4 September 1969; 56 years ago

Passengers
- 2025: 4,567,865 (Note: The data here is limited to the most recent ten years to avoid excessive listings; earlier figures can be found in this page's history or on the Mexico City Metro website. To calculate the average daily ridership, the annual total is divided by 365 days (366 in leap years), with decimals omitted from the result. Each station per line is ranked individually, as the system counts transfer stations separately. The percentage change is calculated automatically using the data from the current year and the previous year.)
- Rank: 115/195

Services
Preceding station	Mexico City Metro	Following station
Chapultepec toward Observatorio	Line 1	Insurgentes toward Pantitlán
Route map
Location
- Location within Mexico City
- Area map

Sevilla is a station on Line 1 the Mexico City Metro. It is located in the Cuauhtémoc borough in the centre of Mexico City, on Avenida Chapultepec and Sevilla street. It serves colonias Roma and Juárez. From November 2023 to April 2025, the station remained closed for modernization work on the tunnel and the line's technical equipment.

== Iconography ==
The station logo depicts an aqueduct. This is because above the station are the remains of a colonial era aqueduct, built in 1779, that ran between Chapultepec and Salto del Agua fountain. It had 904 arches and a total length of some 3.7 kilometres (2.3 mi).

== General information ==
Sevilla was opened on 5 September 1969. The station is located near some interesting points of the city, such as the elegant tree-lined boulevard that is Paseo de la Reforma, the U.S. embassy, the Zona Rosa shopping and entertainment district, and the Torre Mayor, one of Latin America's tallest buildings.

=== Ridership ===
Annual passenger ridership
Year	Ridership	Average daily	Rank	% change	Ref.
2025	4,567,865	12,514	115/195	NA
2024	0	0	189/195	−100.00%
2023	4,995,293	13,685	95/195	−18.43%
2022	6,124,155	16,778	61/195	+8.89%
2021	5,624,058	15,408	38/195	−3.07%
2020	5,801,920	15,852	45/195	−47.84%
2019	11,123,527	30,475	40/195	+0.55%
2018	11,062,555	30,308	42/195	−2.57%
2017	11,354,446	31,108	38/195	−9.45%
2016	12,539,284	34,260	30/195	+1.91%

== Nearby ==
- Chapultepec aqueduct
- Diana the Huntress Fountain, monumental fountain of Diana located at Paseo de la Reforma.
- Angel of Independence, victory column on a roundabout on the major thoroughfare of Paseo de la Reforma.
- Zona Rosa, neighborhood known for its shopping, nightlife, gay community and Korean community.

== Exits ==
- Northeast: Avenida Chapultepec, Colonia Juárez
- Northwest: Avenida Chapultepec, Colonia Juárez
- South: Avenida Chapultepec, Colonia Roma Norte

== Gallery ==
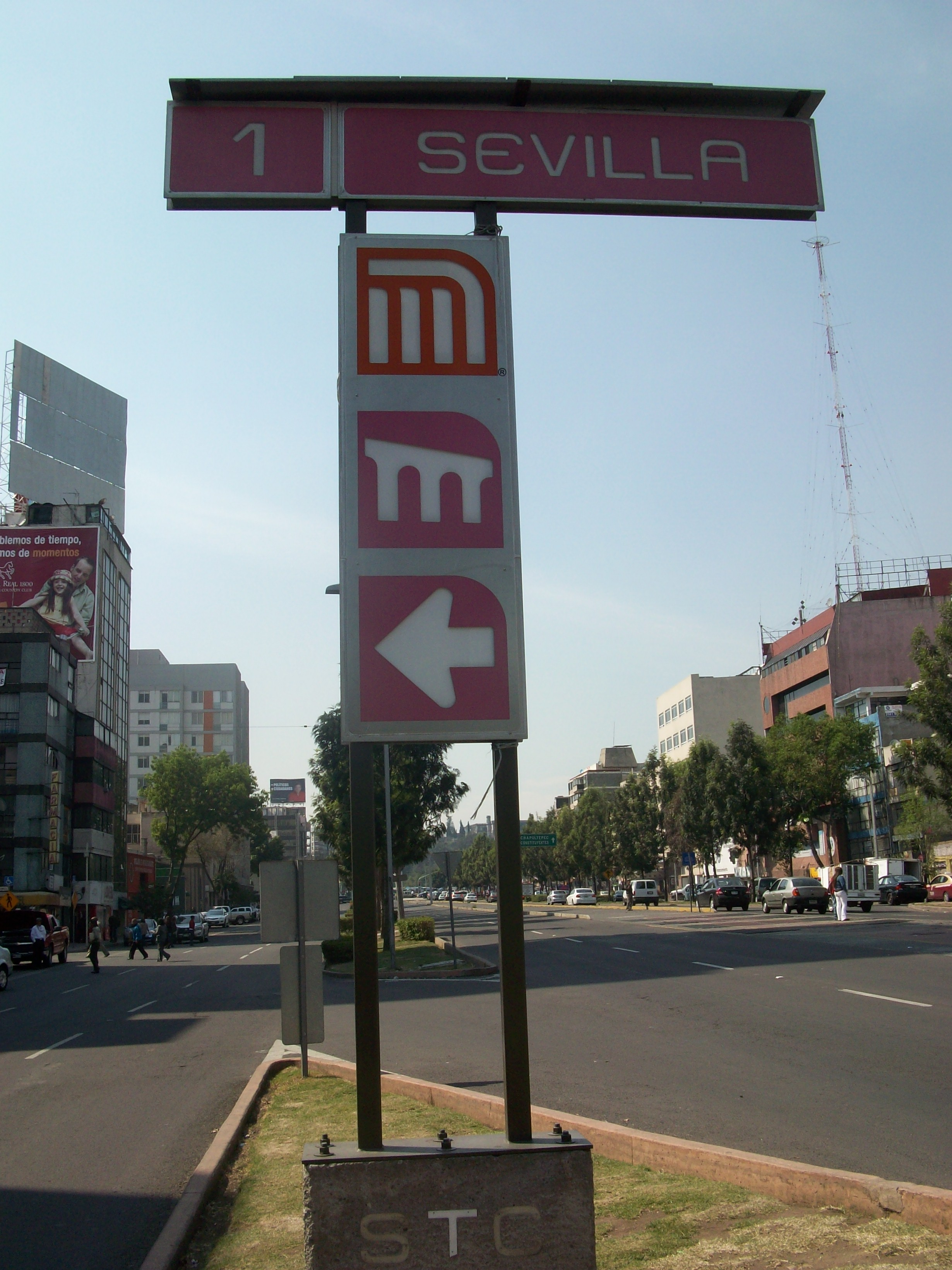
Sign for Estación Sevilla
