= El Buen Tono =

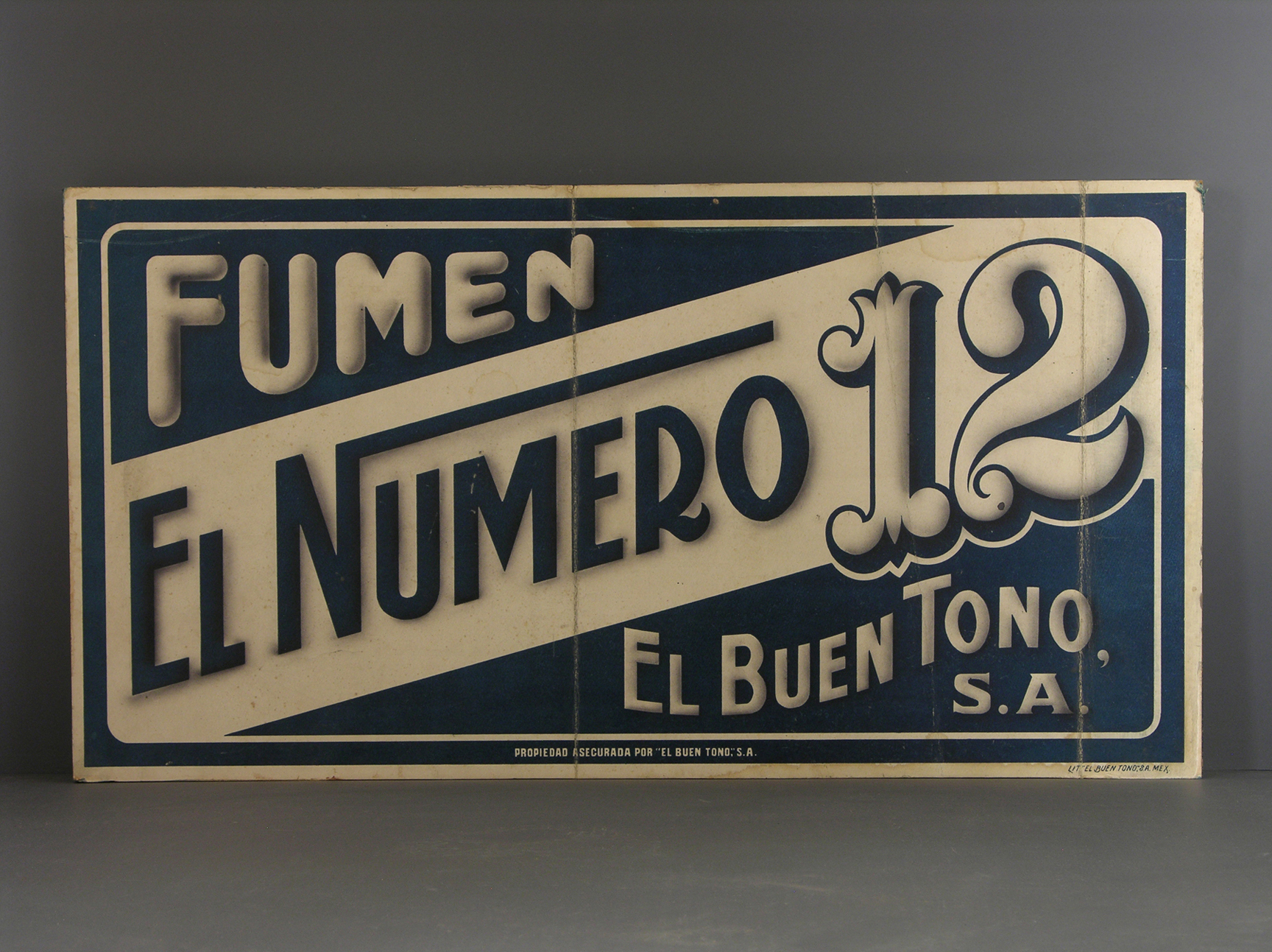
El Buen Tono cardboard and wood cigarette box, part of the collection of the Museo del Objeto del Objeto.

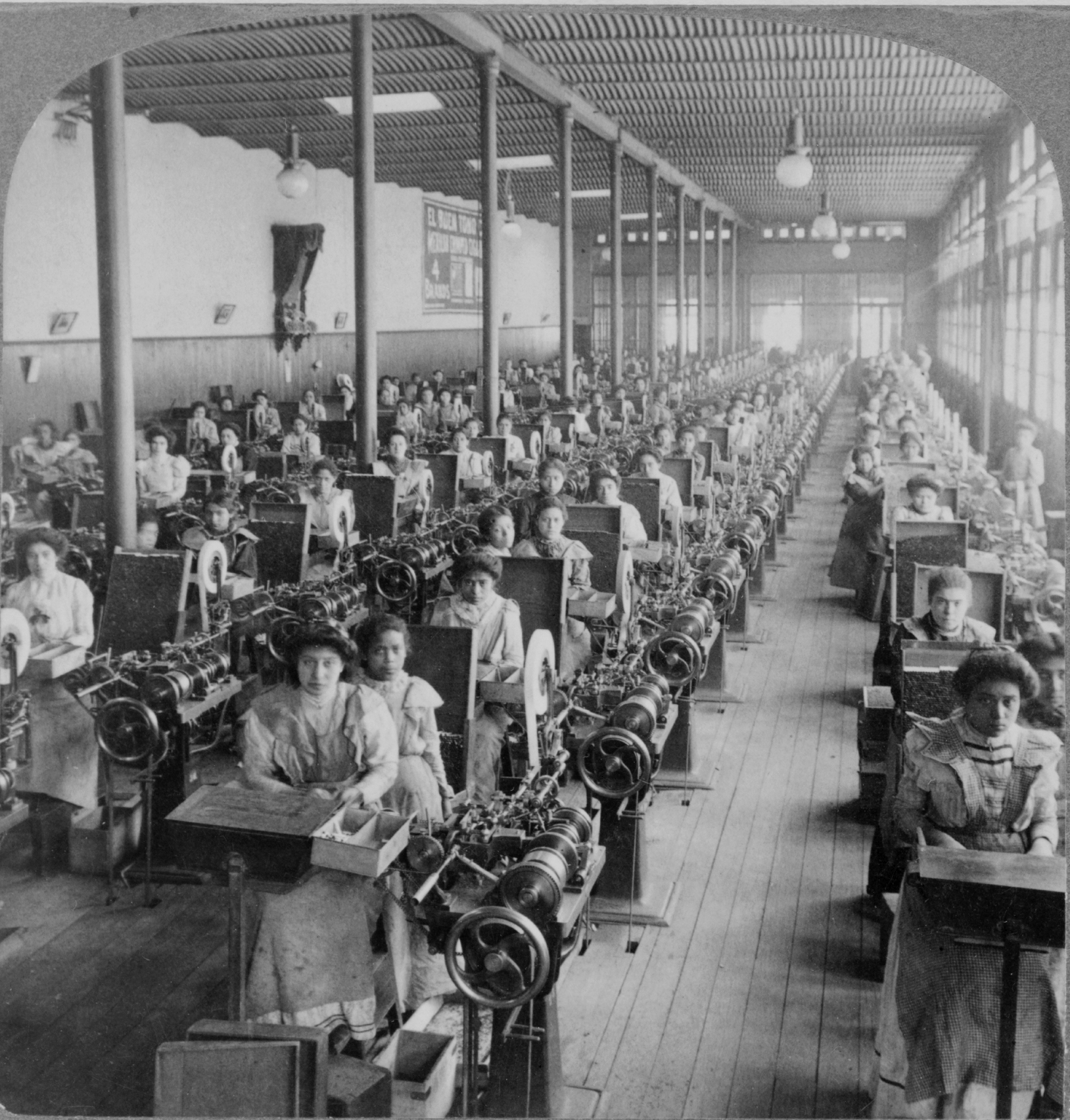
Women making cigarettes in the El Buen Tono factory, 1903

El Buen Tono was a Mexican manufacturer of cigarettes founded by Ernesto Pugibet, a French entrepreneur who migrated to Mexico in 1879. The company was founded in 1894 and ceased to exist around 1961.
