= Plaza Giordano Bruno =

Public space in Mexico City

Coordinates: 19°25′43″N 99°09′23″W

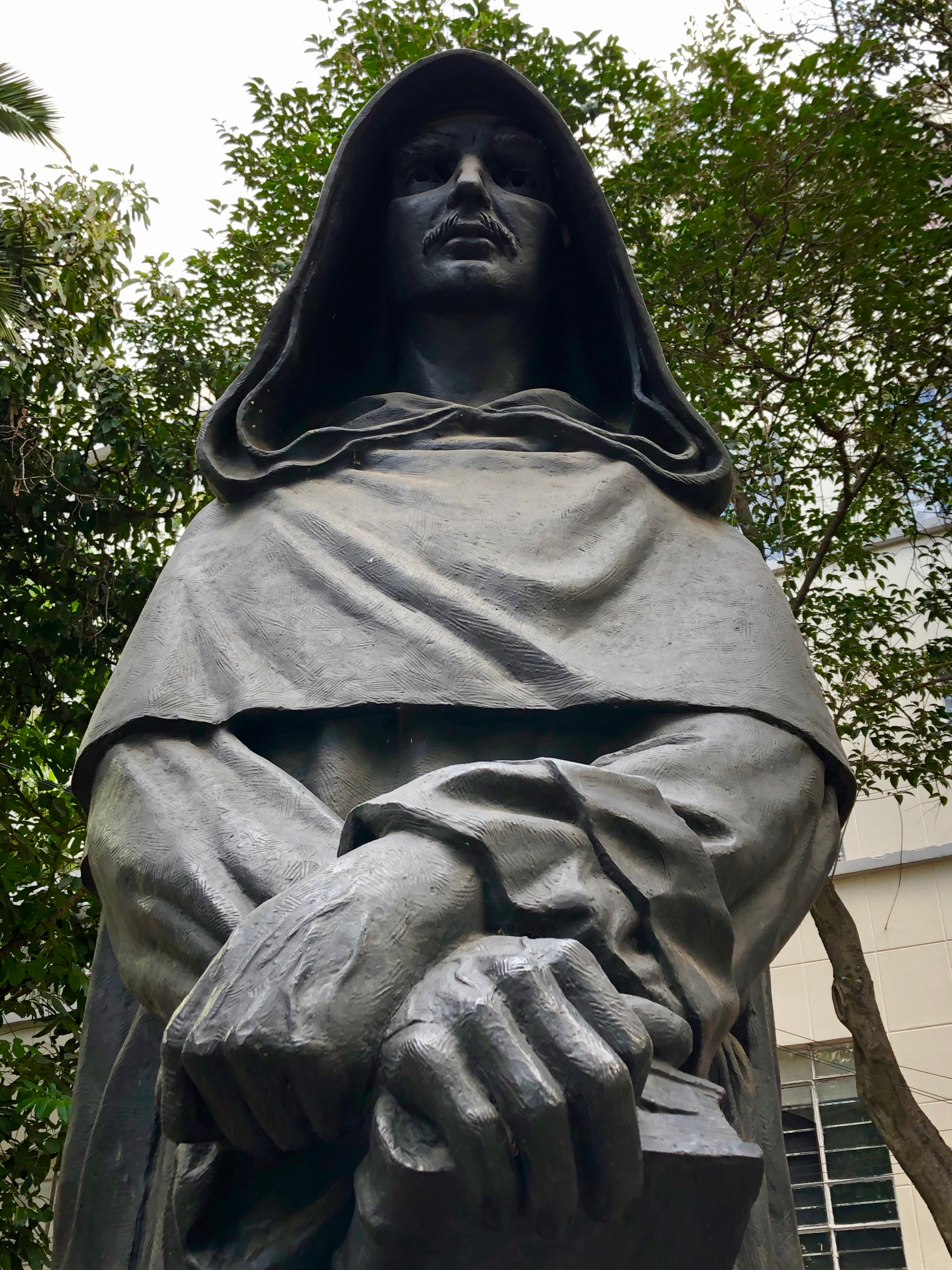
Statue of Giordano Bruno

Plaza Giordano Bruno is a public space in Colonia Juárez, Mexico City. Its namesake is Giordano Bruno (1548–1600), an Italian philosopher, poet, cosmological theorist and esotericist who was executed by the Papal States for heresy. A statue of Bruno adorns the plaza.
