= Ernesto Pugibet =

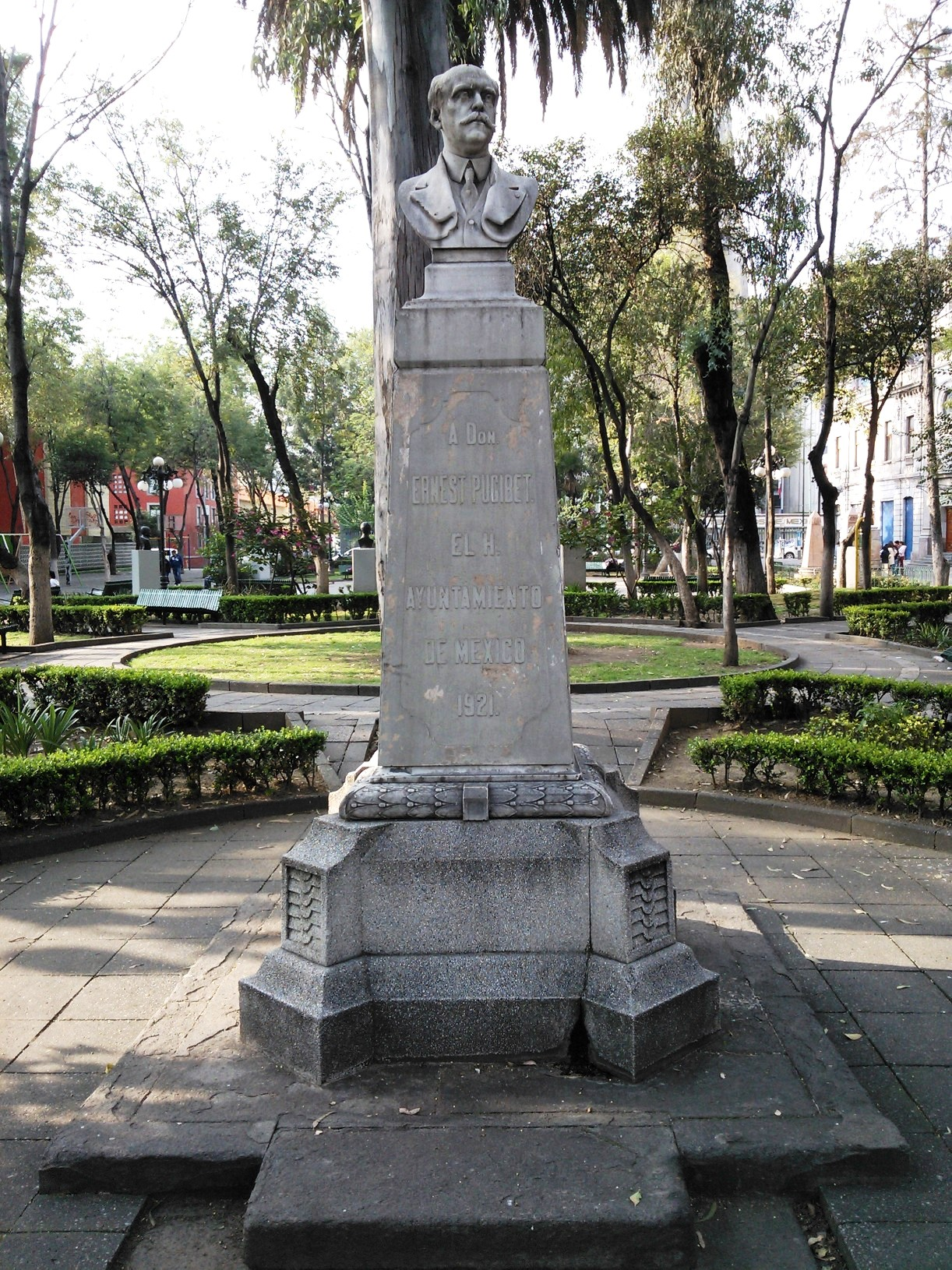
Monument to Ernesto Pugibet in the Plaza de San Juan

Ernesto Pugibet, or, Ernest Pugibet in French, (May 12, 1853 - March 5, 1915) was a French Mexican entrepreneur. He is regarded as one of the key figures in Mexico's industrial revolution, at the turn of the 20th century, and a pioneer of early advertising.

== Biography ==
He was born in Saint-Martory, Haute-Garonne, France, in 1853. He left his motherland in 1875 heading for Cuba where he would learn about the tobacco industry. In 1879 he immigrated to Mexico where he would later establish the cigarette factory known as El Buen Tono. He married Guadalupe de la Portilla in 1887 and fathered three children, Juan, Ernesto and Ana Maria. He died on March 5, 1915, in Paris, France.
