= Morelos metro station =

Mexico City metro station

Morelos
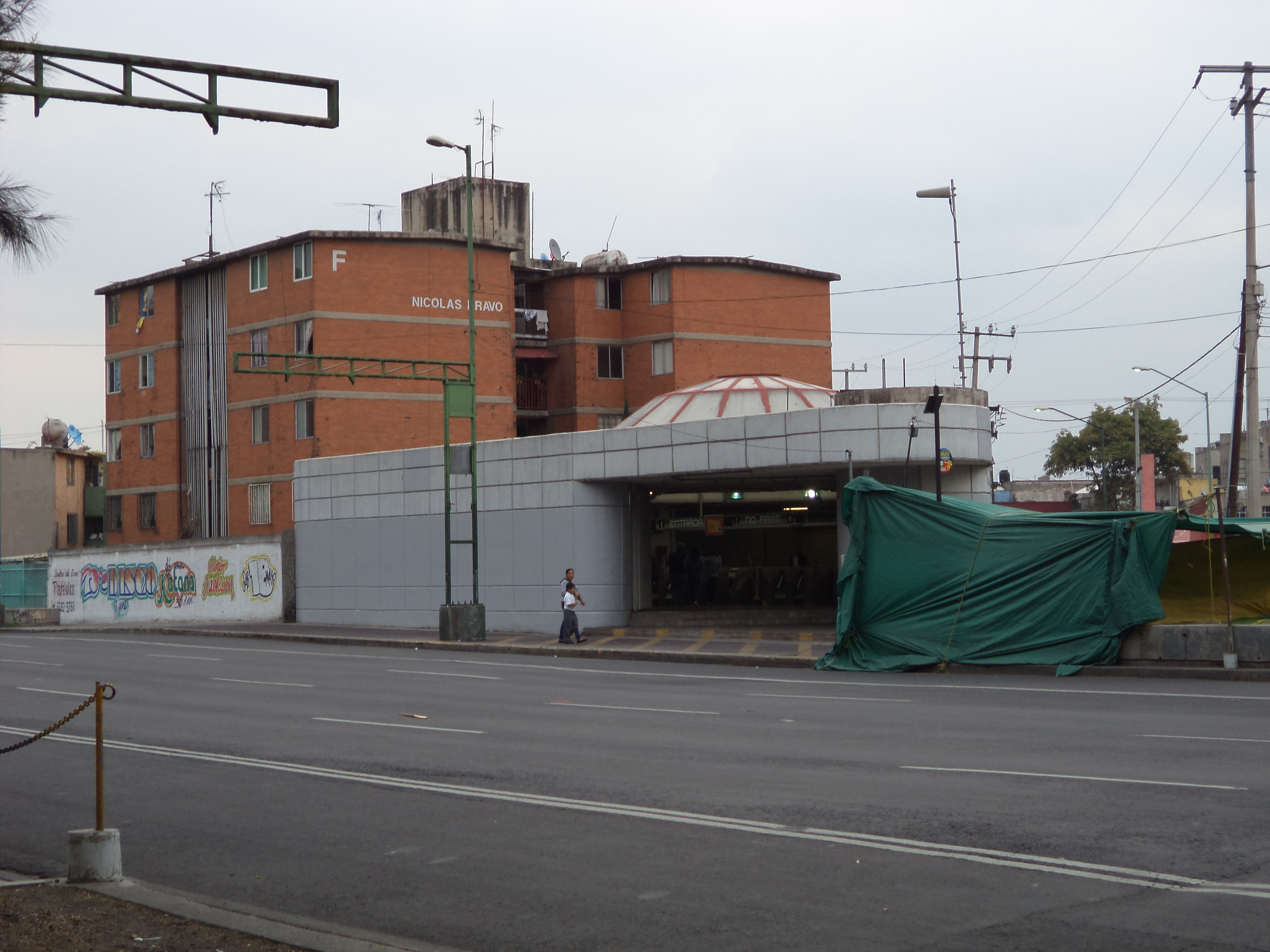
- Entrance to the station

General information
- Location: Mexico City; Mexico
- Coordinates: 19°26′20″N 99°07′06″W
- System: Mexico City Metro
- Operator: Sistema de Transporte Colectivo (STC)
- Platforms: 4 side platforms
- Tracks: 4
- Connections: Morelos

Construction
- Structure type: Elevated; Underground
- Accessible: Partial

Other information
- Status: In service

History
- Opened: 29 August 1981; 44 years ago 15 December 1999; 26 years ago

Passengers
- 2025: Total: 4,483,266; 2,244,261 (Note: The data here is limited to the most recent ten years to avoid excessive listings; earlier figures can be found in this page's history or on the Mexico City Metro website. To calculate the average daily ridership, the annual total is divided by 365 days (366 in leap years), with decimals omitted from the result. Each station per line is ranked individually, as the system counts transfer stations separately. The percentage change is calculated automatically using the data from the current year and the previous year.); 2,239,005 ▲6.01%
- Rank: 171/195; 174/195

Services
Preceding station	Mexico City Metro	Following station
Canal del Norte toward Martín Carrera	Line 4	Candelaria toward Santa Anita
San Lázaro toward Ciudad Azteca	Line B	Tepito toward Buenavista
Route map
Location
- Location within Mexico City
- Area map

Morelos is a station on the Mexico City Metro. It is located in Venustiano Carranza borough, in the north of Mexico City.

== General information ==
The station logo depicts the profile of José María Morelos y Pavón, second instigator of the War of Independence of 1810. Its name refers to the neighborhood which it serves.

This station has a peculiar feature; it is the only one that has two different logos: one, the profile of Morelos shown above; the other, a 3/4-view of him. Both logos were stylized reproductions of peso coins from the 1980s. Today the 3/4-view logo is used only in the Line 4 area of the station.

Morelos was originally to be named Metro Terminal Tapo, referring to the eastern intercity bus station. (locally known as "la Tapo"), located about a kilometre away; for this reason, the Metro authorities decided instead to name the station for the neighborhood which it serves. Metro San Lázaro is closer to the bus station and, in fact, is directly connected to it by means of a pedestrian tunnel.

Morelos has facilities for the handicapped and a cultural display.

=== Ridership ===
Annual passenger ridership (Line 4)
Year	Ridership	Average daily	Rank	% change	Ref.
2025	2,244,261	6,148	171/195	−2.97%
2024	2,312,884	6,319	161/195	−1.51%
2023	2,348,294	6,433	149/195	+12.74%
2022	2,082,956	5,706	152/195	+17.64%
2021	1,770,575	4,850	146/195	−4.75%
2020	1,858,938	5,079	156/195	−38.47%
2019	3,020,965	8,276	163/195	+4.99%
2018	2,877,422	7,883	166/195	+2.45%
2017	2,808,524	7,694	169/195	−0.62%
2016	2,826,122	7,721	168/195	−0.90%

Annual passenger ridership (Line B)
Year	Ridership	Average daily	Rank	% change	Ref.
2025	2,239,005	6,134	174/195	+28.85%
2024	1,737,715	4,747	173/195	−7.60%
2023	1,880,657	5,152	160/195	+11.55%
2022	1,685,910	4,618	160/195	+69.34%
2021	995,579	2,727	175/195	−33.45%
2020	1,495,977	4,087	166/195	−24.17%
2019	1,972,909	5,405	189/195	+9.13%
2018	1,807,924	4,953	187/195	+10.79%
2017	1,631,818	4,470	188/195	+14.65%
2016	1,423,353	3,888	190/195	−16.67%
