= Tepito metro station =

Mexico City metro station

Tepito
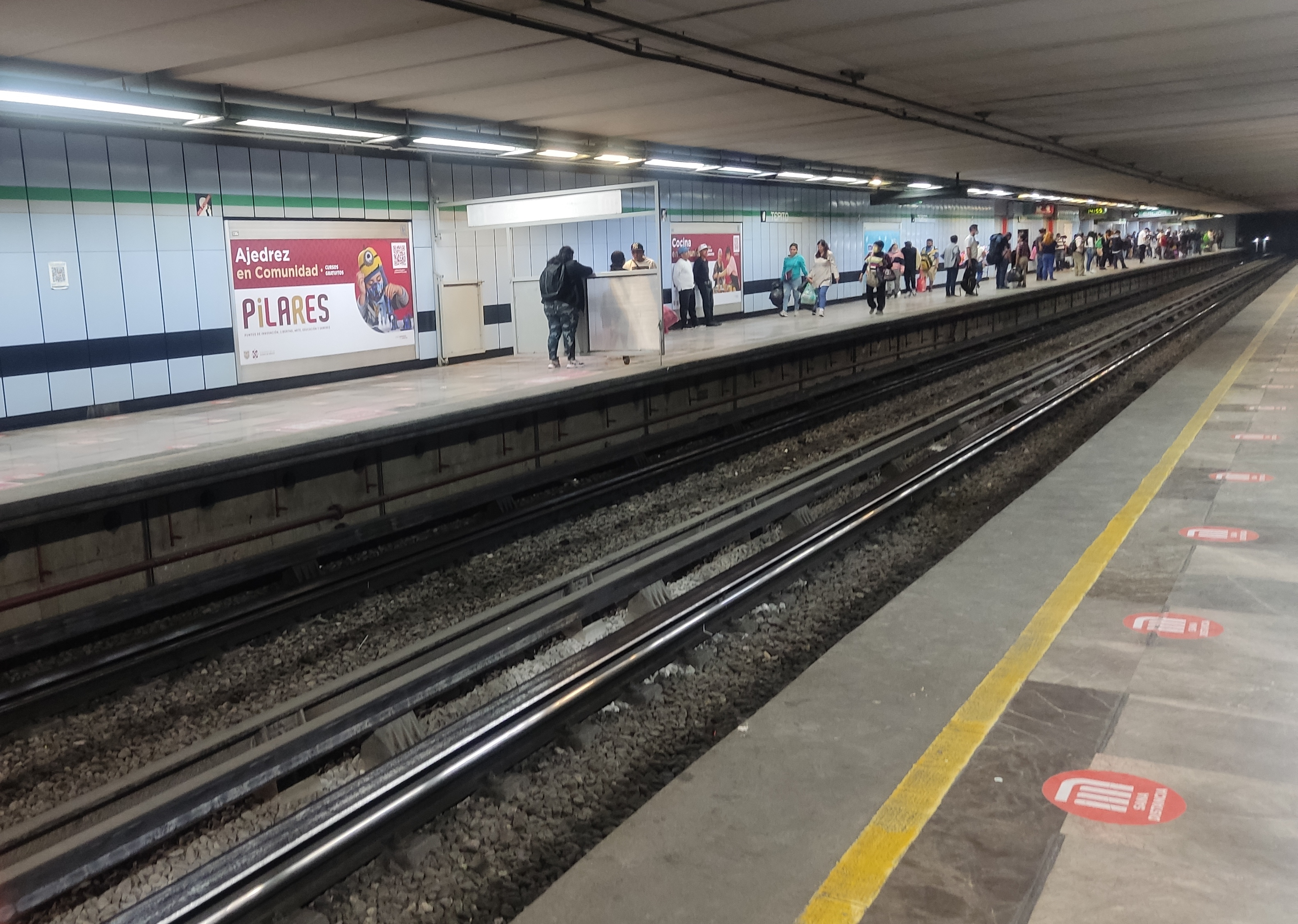

General information
- Location: Mexico City; Mexico
- Coordinates: 19°26′33″N 99°07′24″W
- System: Mexico City Metro
- Platforms: 2 side platforms
- Tracks: 2

Construction
- Structure type: Underground

History
- Opened: 15 December 1999

Passengers
- 2025: 6,701,717 (Note: The data here is limited to the most recent ten years to avoid excessive listings; earlier figures can be found in this page's history or on the Mexico City Metro website. To calculate the average daily ridership, the annual total is divided by 365 days (366 in leap years), with decimals omitted from the result. Each station per line is ranked individually, as the system counts transfer stations separately. The percentage change is calculated automatically using the data from the current year and the previous year.) ▼9.8%
- Rank: 62/195

Services
Preceding station	Mexico City Metro	Following station
Morelos toward Ciudad Azteca	Line B	Lagunilla toward Buenavista
Route map
Location
- Location within Mexico City
- Area map

Tepito is a station of the Metro B line located north of the center of México City in the barrio Tepito in the Colonia Morelos district of the Cuauhtémoc delegation. The station's logo represents a boxing glove. Many Mexican boxers were born and raised in Tepito, like Rubén Olivares "El Púas" ("spikes").

The station was opened on 15 December 1999.

From 23 April to 28 June 2020, the station was temporarily closed due to the COVID-19 pandemic in Mexico.

== Ridership ==
Annual passenger ridership
Year	Ridership	Average daily	Rank	% change	Ref.
2025	6,701,717	18,360	62/195	−9.80%
2024	7,429,955	20,300	48/195	−4.90%
2023	7,813,178	21,405	46/195	+14.40%
2022	6,829,628	18,711	49/195	+23.77%
2021	5,518,062	15,117	40/195	+16.39%
2020	4,741,168	12,954	66/195	−42.42%
2019	8,233,487	22,557	70/195	+3.67%
2018	7,942,264	21,759	76/195	+5.08%
2017	7,558,104	20,707	85/195	−7.28%
2016	8,151,741	22,272	79/195	+3.77%
