= Lagunilla metro station =

Mexico City metro station

Lagunilla
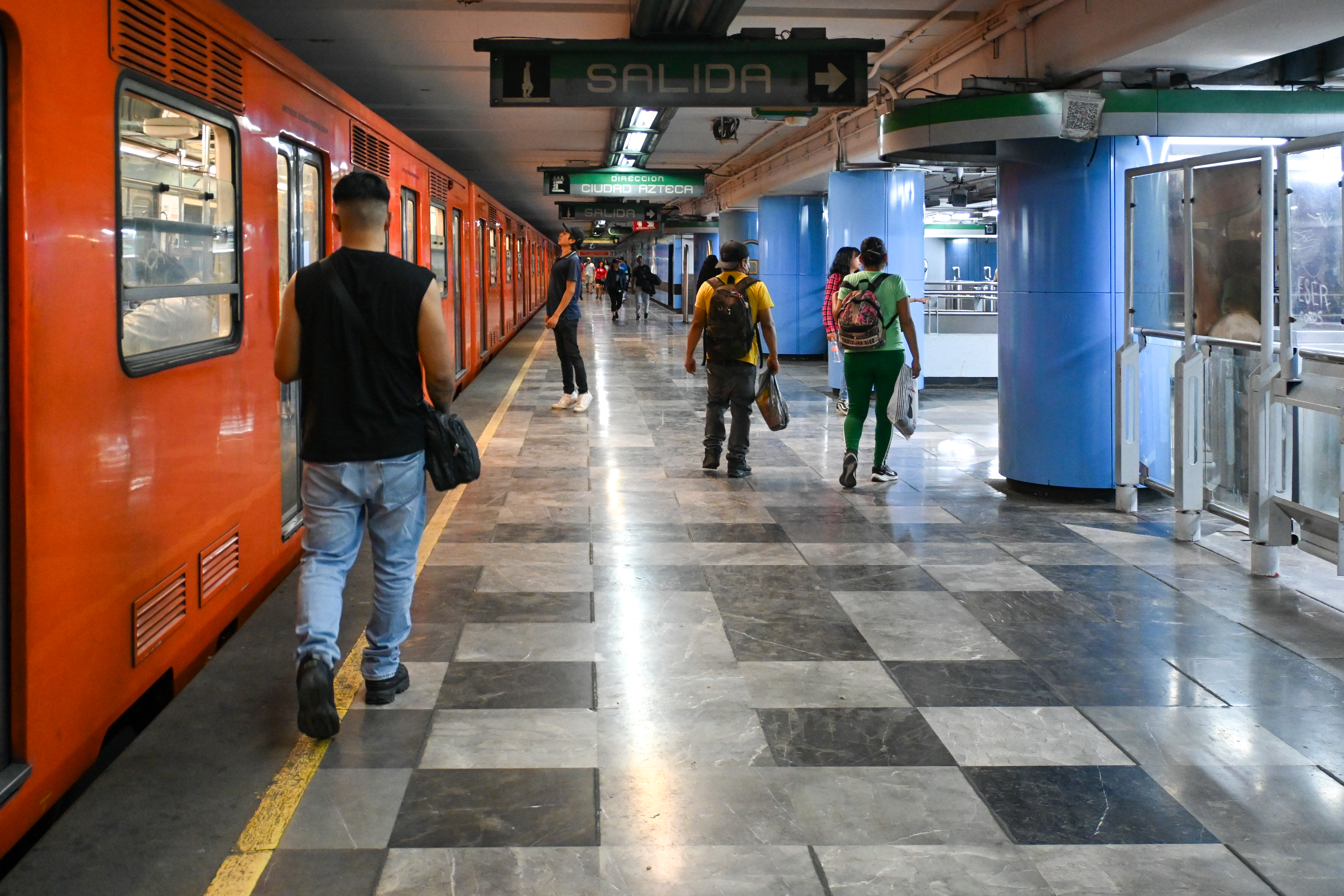
- Platform of the station

General information
- Location: Mexico City; Mexico
- Coordinates: 19°26′36″N 99°07′53″W
- System: Mexico City Metro
- Platforms: 2 side platforms
- Tracks: 2

Construction
- Structure type: Underground

History
- Opened: 15 December 1999

Passengers
- 2025: 7,045,417 (Note: The data here is limited to the most recent ten years to avoid excessive listings; earlier figures can be found in this page's history or on the Mexico City Metro website. To calculate the average daily ridership, the annual total is divided by 365 days (366 in leap years), with decimals omitted from the result. Each station per line is ranked individually, as the system counts transfer stations separately. The percentage change is calculated automatically using the data from the current year and the previous year.) ▲2.17%
- Rank: 58/195

Services
Preceding station	Mexico City Metro	Following station
Tepito toward Ciudad Azteca	Line B	Garibaldi toward Buenavista
Route map
Location
- Location within Mexico City
- Area map

Lagunilla is a station along Line B of the Mexico City Metro located north of the center of Mexico City, near the famous market with the same name (next to and used interchangeably with Tepito).

The logo for the station is a wild duck. The station was opened on 15 December 1999.

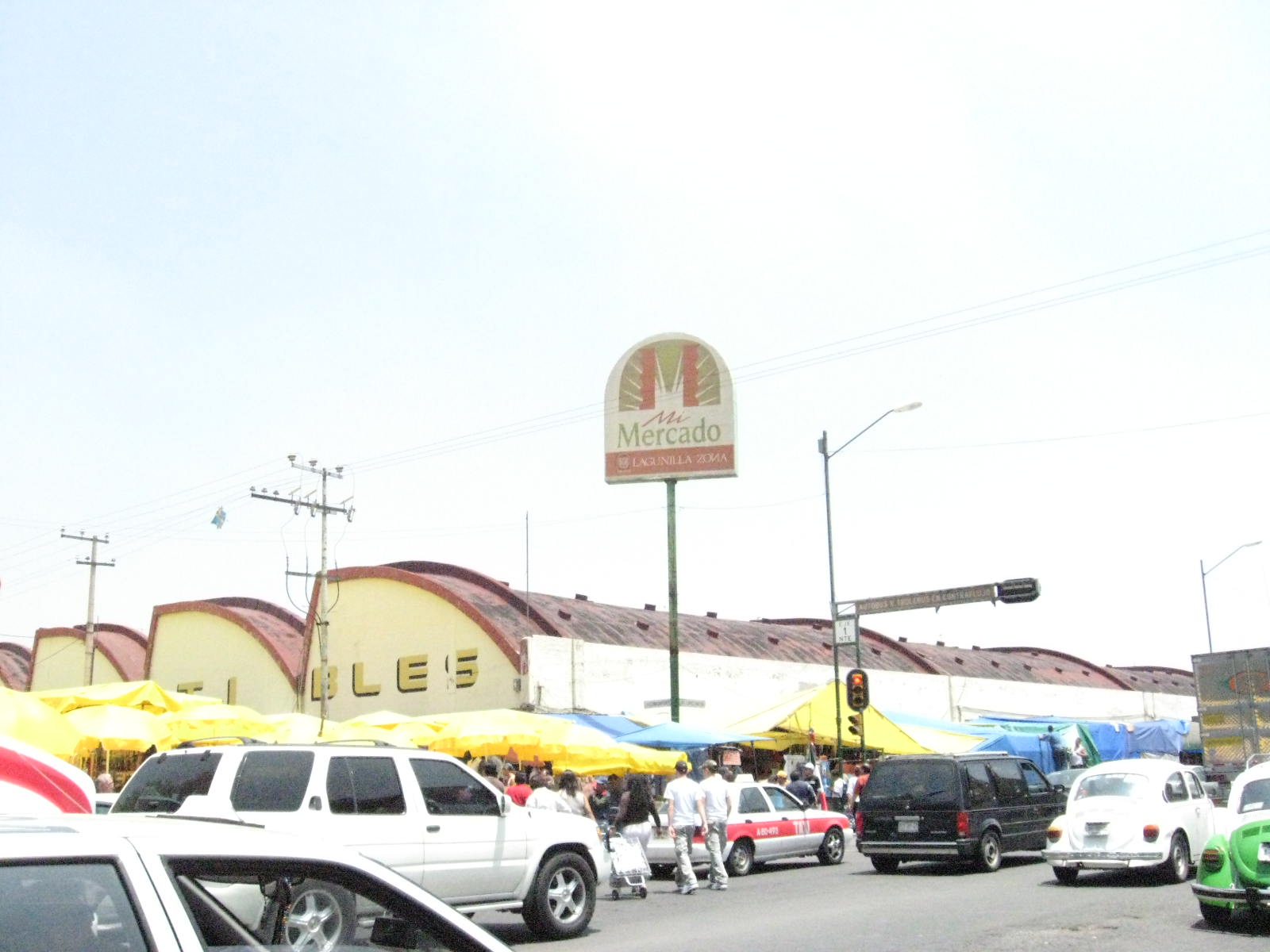
A small portion of the La Lagunilla market for which the station is named

== Ridership ==
Annual passenger ridership
Year	Ridership	Average daily	Rank	% change	Ref.
2025	7,045,417	19,302	58/195	+2.17%
2024	6,895,882	18,841	56/195	−1.21%
2023	6,980,442	19,124	58/195	+2.24%
2022	6,827,483	18,705	50/195	+40.40%
2021	4,862,989	13,323	53/195	−1.23%
2020	4,923,598	13,452	59/195	−41.35%
2019	8,394,391	22,998	64/195	−4.73%
2018	8,811,544	24,141	59/195	−0.84%
2017	8,885,979	24,345	57/195	−5.81%
2016	9,434,444	25,777	54/195	−2.52%
