= Bosque de Aragón metro station =

Mexico City metro station

Bosque de Aragón
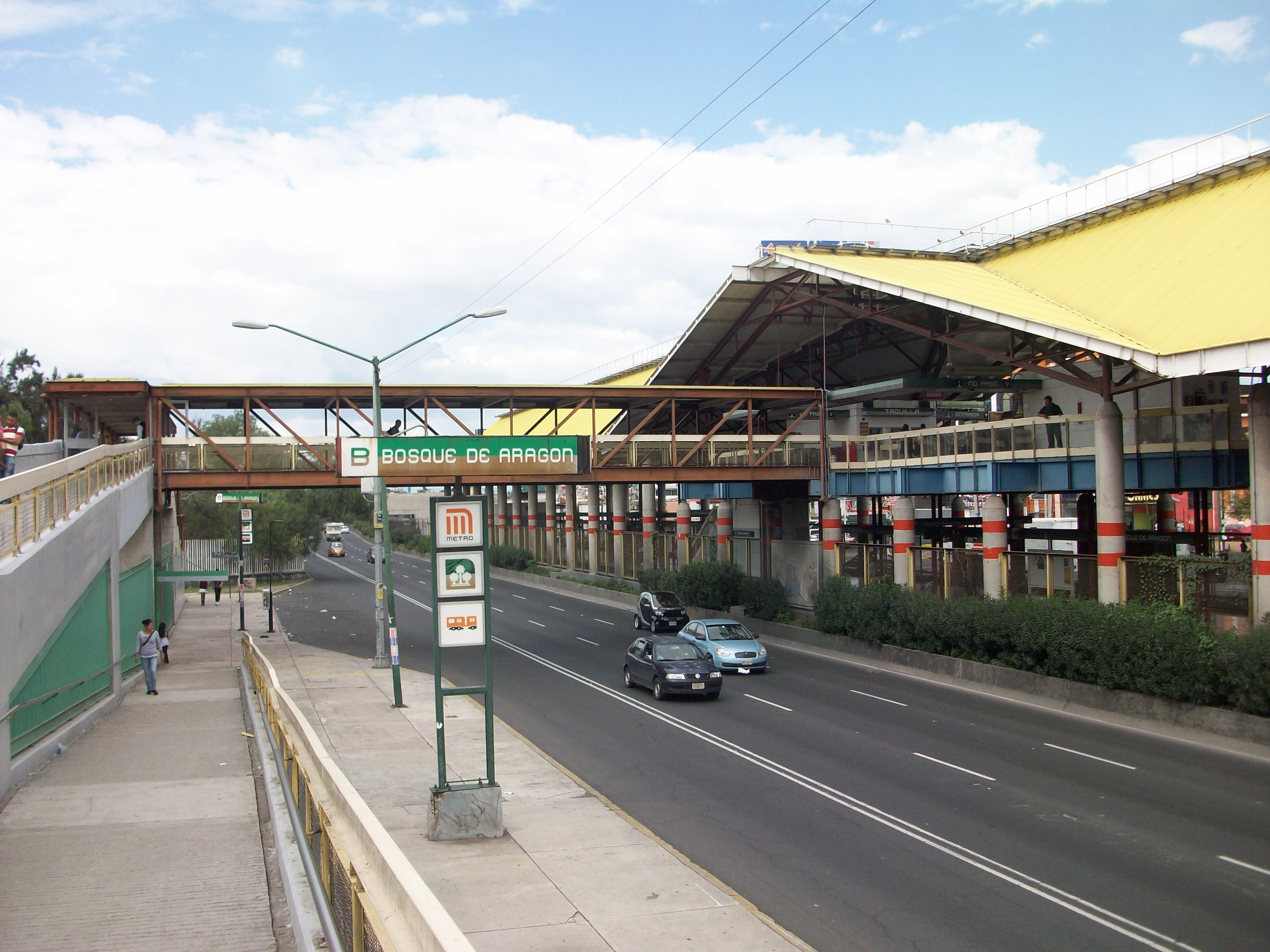
- Station and sign, 2012

General information
- Location: Mexico City; Mexico
- Coordinates: 19°27′29″N 99°04′09″W
- System: Mexico City Metro
- Platforms: 1 island platform
- Tracks: 2

Construction
- Structure type: At grade

History
- Opened: 15 December 1999

Passengers
- 2025: 1,899,325 (Note: The data here is limited to the most recent ten years to avoid excessive listings; earlier figures can be found in this page's history or on the Mexico City Metro website. To calculate the average daily ridership, the annual total is divided by 365 days (366 in leap years), with decimals omitted from the result. Each station per line is ranked individually, as the system counts transfer stations separately. The percentage change is calculated automatically using the data from the current year and the previous year.) ▲2.41%
- Rank: 178/195

Services
Preceding station	Mexico City Metro	Following station
Villa de Aragón toward Ciudad Azteca	Line B	Deportivo Oceanía toward Buenavista
Route map
Location
- Location within Mexico City
- Area map

Bosque de Aragón is a subway station in Gustavo A. Madero borough, in México City Mexico. The station was opened on 15 December 1999.

== Ridership ==
Annual passenger ridership
Year	Ridership	Average daily	Rank	% change	Ref.
2025	1,899,325	5,203	178/195	+2.41%
2024	1,854,542	5,067	170/195	+3.32%
2023	1,794,969	4,917	163/195	+13.80%
2022	1,577,284	4,321	165/195	+47.50%
2021	1,069,381	2,929	172/195	−6.40%
2020	1,142,478	3,121	184/195	−47.92%
2019	2,193,804	6,010	181/195	−1.84%
2018	2,234,978	6,123	180/195	−5.01%
2017	2,352,976	6,446	176/195	−5.73%
2016	2,496,091	6,819	175/195	+3.30%
