= Impulsora metro station =

Mexico City metro station

Impulsora
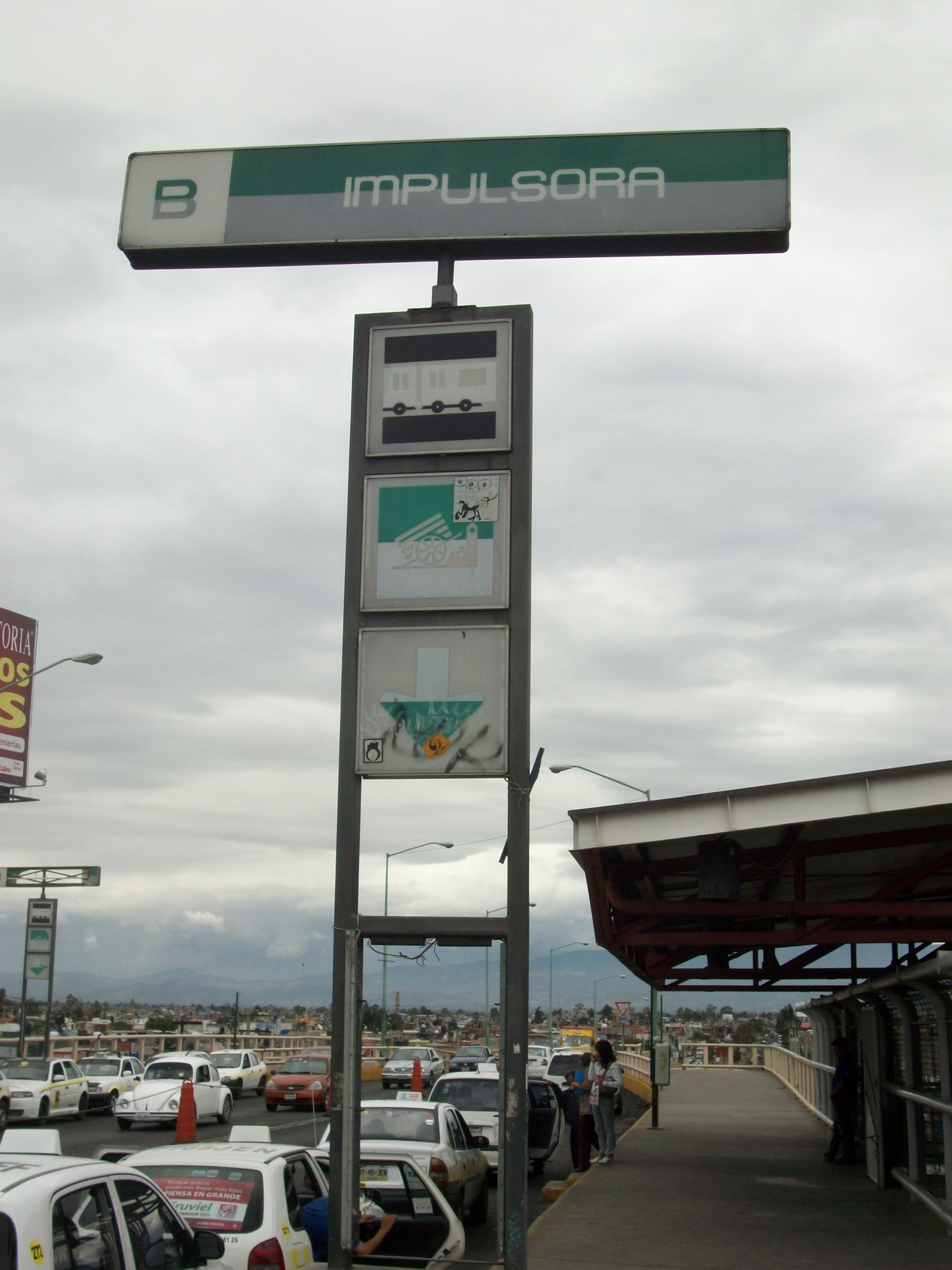

General information
- Location: Ciudad Nezahualcóyotl, State of Mexico; Mexico
- Coordinates: 19°29′09″N 99°02′56″W
- System: Mexico City Metro
- Platforms: 1 island platform
- Tracks: 2

Construction
- Structure type: At grade
- Accessible: yes

History
- Opened: 30 November 2000

Passengers
- 2025: 7,113,520 (Note: The data here is limited to the most recent ten years to avoid excessive listings; earlier figures can be found in this page's history or on the Mexico City Metro website. To calculate the average daily ridership, the annual total is divided by 365 days (366 in leap years), with decimals omitted from the result. Each station per line is ranked individually, as the system counts transfer stations separately. The percentage change is calculated automatically using the data from the current year and the previous year.) ▼0.4%
- Rank: 57/195

Services
| Preceding station | Mexico City Metro | Following station |
|---|---|---|
| Río de los Remedios toward Ciudad Azteca | Line B | Nezahualcóyotl toward Buenavista |
Route map
Location
- Location within Mexico City
- Area map

Impulsora is a station on Line B of the Mexico City Metro system.

The logo for the station is a cart with an old hacienda in the background. The station was opened on 30 November 2000.

== Ridership ==
Annual passenger ridership
| Year | Ridership | Average daily | Rank | % change | Ref. |
|---|---|---|---|---|---|
| 2025 | 7,113,520 | 19,489 | 57/195 | −0.40% |
| 2024 | 7,142,436 | 19,514 | 52/195 | −2.88% |
| 2023 | 7,354,507 | 20,149 | 51/195 | +1.50% |
| 2022 | 7,245,485 | 19,850 | 45/195 | +41.81% |
| 2021 | 5,109,318 | 13,998 | 49/195 | +9.63% |
| 2020 | 4,660,458 | 12,733 | 69/195 | −48.82% |
| 2019 | 9,105,811 | 24,947 | 56/195 | +1.99% |
| 2018 | 8,927,903 | 24,460 | 57/195 | +2.89% |
| 2017 | 8,677,537 | 23,774 | 63/195 | −6.70% |
| 2016 | 9,300,528 | 25,411 | 57/195 | +2.54% |
