= Nezahualcóyotl metro station =

Mexico City metro station

Nezahualcóyotl
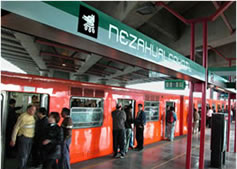
- Train at platform

General information
- Location: Ciudad Nezahualcóyotl; Mexico
- Coordinates: 19°28′23″N 99°03′16″W
- System: Mexico City Metro
- Platforms: 1 island platform
- Tracks: 2

Construction
- Structure type: At grade

History
- Opened: 30 November 2000
- Former names: Continentes

Passengers
- 2025: 6,580,951 (Note: The data here is limited to the most recent ten years to avoid excessive listings; earlier figures can be found in this page's history or on the Mexico City Metro website. To calculate the average daily ridership, the annual total is divided by 365 days (366 in leap years), with decimals omitted from the result. Each station per line is ranked individually, as the system counts transfer stations separately. The percentage change is calculated automatically using the data from the current year and the previous year.) ▼2.27%
- Rank: 66/195

Services
Preceding station	Mexico City Metro	Following station
Impulsora toward Ciudad Azteca	Line B	Villa de Aragón toward Buenavista
Route map
Location
- Location within Mexico City
- Area map

Nezahualcóyotl is a station on Line B of the Mexico City Metro system. It is located in Ciudad Nezahualcóyotl in the State of Mexico adjacent to Mexico City.

The logo for the station is the head of a coyote since Nezahualcóyotl is Nahuatl for "hungry coyote", it is similar to the seal of Ciudad Nezahualcóyotl. The station was opened on 30 November 2000.

From 2000 to 2002 the station name was Continentes (Spanish for "continents"), due to the station being near the Boulevard de los Continentes, and the icon of the station was a Mollweide projection. In 2002, it was decided to change the name of the station to Nezahualcóyotl, to reflect the name of the municipality that is crossed by this specific station.

== Exits ==
- North: Av. Central and Boulevard de los Continentes, Col. Vergel de Guadalupe
- Northeast: Av. Central and Boulevard de los Continentes, Col. Vergel de Guadalupe
- South: Av. Central and Av. Jorge Jiménez Cantú, Col. Vergel de Guadalupe
- Southeast: Av. Central and Av. Jorge Jiménez Cantú, Col. Vergel de Guadalupe

== Ridership ==
Annual passenger ridership
Year	Ridership	Average daily	Rank	% change	Ref.
2025	6,580,951	18,030	66/195	−2.27%
2024	6,733,659	18,397	57/195	−0.74%
2023	6,783,680	18,585	63/195	+14.05%
2022	5,947,863	16,295	65/195	+39.66%
2021	4,258,836	11,668	71/195	+57.13%
2020	2,710,341	7,405	131/195	−67.65%
2019	8,378,849	22,955	65/195	+3.22%
2018	8,117,663	22,240	74/195	+0.08%
2017	8,111,393	22,222	70/195	−7.78%
2016	8,795,582	24,031	63/195	−1.37%
