= Río de los Remedios metro station =

Mexico City metro station

Río de los Remedios
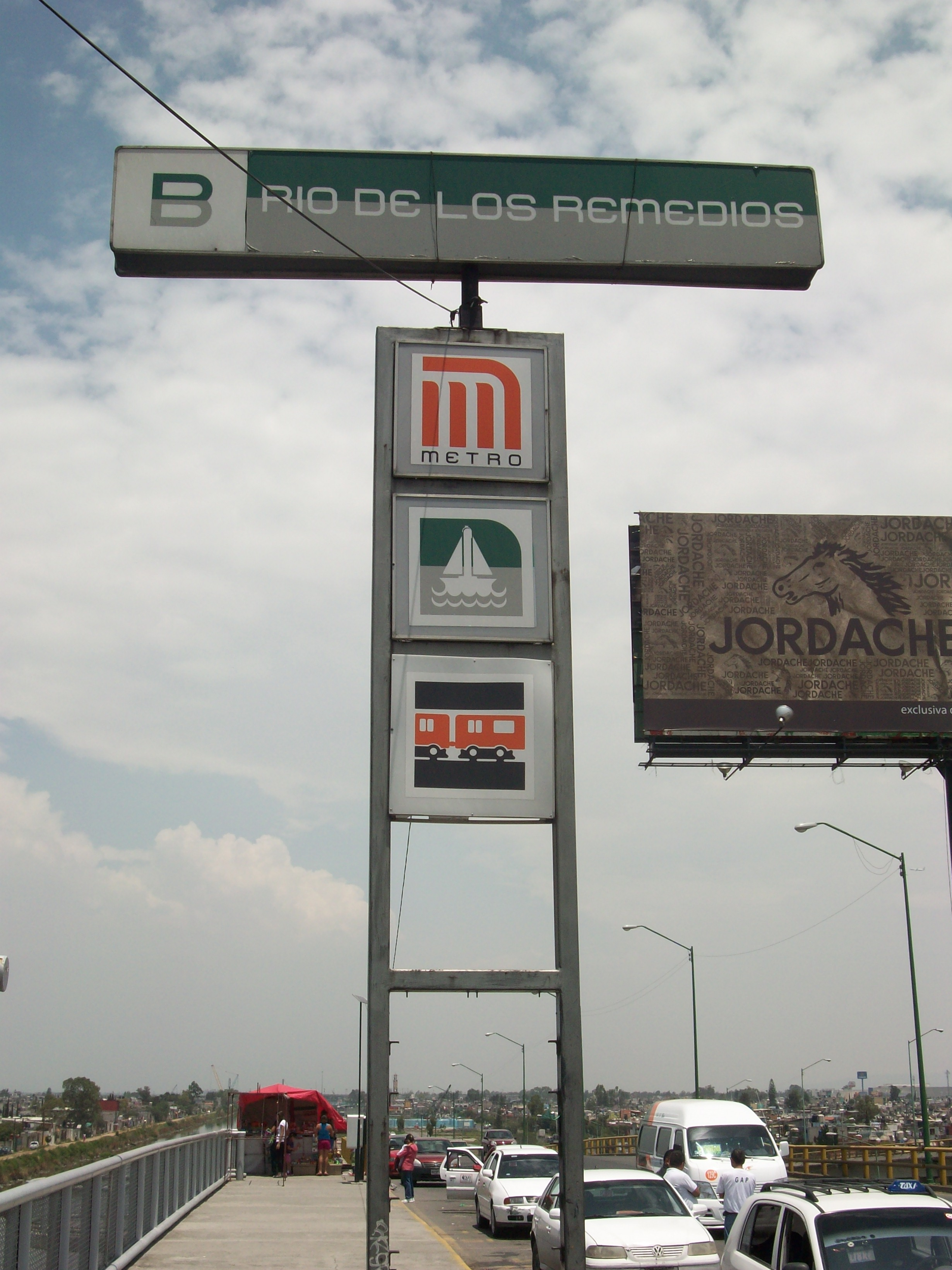
- Rio de los Remedios entrance, 24 July 2012

General information
- Location: Nezahualcóyotl, State of Mexico; Mexico
- Coordinates: 19°29′27″N 99°02′48″W
- System: Mexico City Metro
- Platforms: 1 island platform
- Tracks: 2

Construction
- Structure type: At grade

History
- Opened: 30 November 2000

Passengers
- 2025: 5,434,828 (Note: The data here is limited to the most recent ten years to avoid excessive listings; earlier figures can be found in this page's history or on the Mexico City Metro website. To calculate the average daily ridership, the annual total is divided by 365 days (366 in leap years), with decimals omitted from the result. Each station per line is ranked individually, as the system counts transfer stations separately. The percentage change is calculated automatically using the data from the current year and the previous year.) ▼4.52%
- Rank: 94/195

Services
Preceding station	Mexico City Metro	Following station
Múzquiz toward Ciudad Azteca	Line B	Impulsora toward Buenavista
Route map
Location
- Location within Mexico City
- Area map

Río de los Remedios is a station on Line B of the Mexico City Metro system. It is located on the Anillo Periférico and Boulevard Río de los Remedios in the Colonia Valle de Aragón 2a. Sección neighborhood of the Nezahualcóyotl municipality in Mexico State.

The station was opened on 30 November 2000.

== Ridership ==
Annual passenger ridership
Year	Ridership	Average daily	Rank	% change	Ref.
2025	5,434,828	14,889	94/195	−4.52%
2024	5,692,103	15,552	80/195	+3.41%
2023	5,504,499	15,080	84/195	+0.92%
2022	5,454,050	14,942	77/195	+13.96%
2021	4,785,870	13,111	55/195	−10.65%
2020	5,356,590	14,635	55/195	−26.93%
2019	7,330,993	20,084	89/195	−5.87%
2018	7,787,996	21,336	83/195	+1.43%
2017	7,678,199	21,036	80/195	−8.67%
2016	8,406,660	22,969	74/195	+2.37%
