= San Lázaro metro station =

Mexico City metro station

San Lázaro
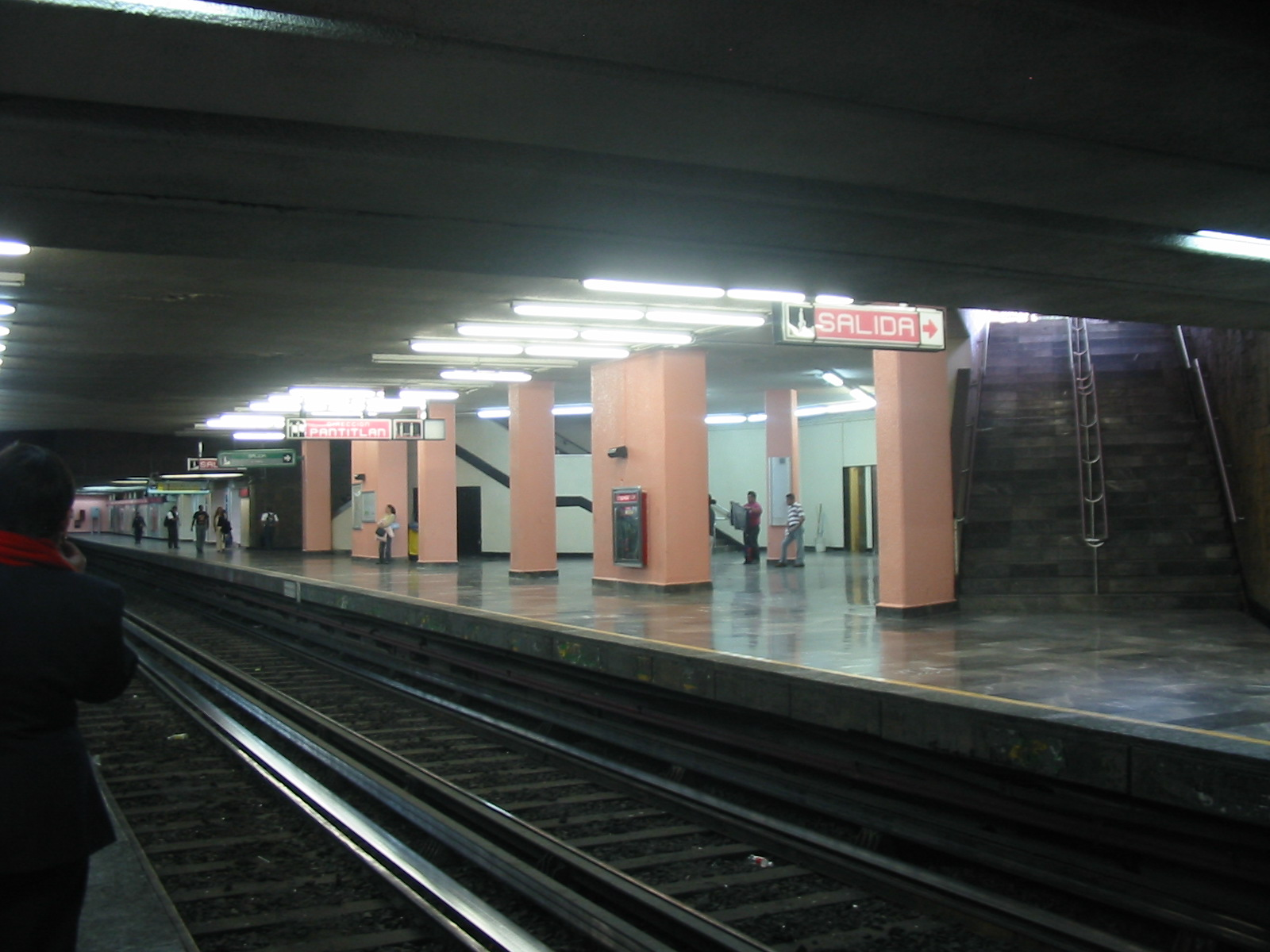
- View of Pantitlán or eastbound platform at San Lázaro

General information
- Location: Calzada Ignacio Zaragoza; 7 de Julio, Venustiano Carranza; Mexico City; Mexico
- Coordinates: 19.430213°N 99.114833°W
- Elevation: 10 m (33 ft)
- System: Mexico City Metro
- Operator: Sistema de Transporte Colectivo (STC)
- Platforms: 4 side platforms
- Tracks: 4
- Connections: San Lázaro; San Lázaro

Construction
- Structure type: Underground; Elevated

Other information
- Status: In service

History
- Opened: 4 September 1969; 56 years ago 15 December 1999; 26 years ago

Key dates
- 11 July 2022: Temporarily closed
- 29 October 2023: Reopened

Passengers
- 2025: Total: 12,001,707; 6,944,644 (Note: The data here is limited to the most recent ten years to avoid excessive listings; earlier figures can be found in this page's history or on the Mexico City Metro website. To calculate the average daily ridership, the annual total is divided by 365 days (366 in leap years), with decimals omitted from the result. Each station per line is ranked individually, as the system counts transfer stations separately. The percentage change is calculated automatically using the data from the current year and the previous year.); 5,057,063 ▲40.79%
- Rank: 60/195; 102/195

Services
Preceding station	Mexico City Metro	Following station
Candelaria toward Observatorio	Line 1	Moctezuma toward Pantitlán
Ricardo Flores Magón toward Ciudad Azteca	Line B	Morelos toward Buenavista
Route map
Location
- Location within Mexico City
- Area map

San Lázaro is a station on the Mexico City Metro. It is located in the Venustiano Carranza borough of Mexico City. Lines 1 and B serve the station. The station was opened on 5 September 1969. The station was designed by Félix Candela and consists of interlocked hyperbolic paraboloidal or saddle roof sections. From July 2022 to October 2023, the Line 1 station was closed due to modernization works on the tunnel and the line's technical equipment.

== General information ==
The station logo depicts an old steam locomotive. Near the site of the metro station stood the San Lázaro mainline train station. San Lázaro was the main terminus for the Interoceanic Railway, which linked the port of Veracruz, on the Gulf of Mexico, with the Pacific Ocean. Today, some railway tracks can still be seen near the metro station, but nothing more.

Nearby is the building that houses the Chamber of Deputies ("Palacio Legislativo" in Spanish), the lower house of the Mexican Congress (Congreso de la Unión).

San Lázaro metro station is connected with TAPO, Mexico City's Eastern intercity bus station. This bus station serves states including Puebla, Veracruz, Oaxaca, and Yucatán. It is used by some of the most prestigious and safest bus lines in Mexico, such as ADO, UNO, and Maya de Oro.

== Nearby ==
- Terminal de Autobuses de Pasajeros de Oriente, bus terminal.
- Palacio Legislativo de San Lázaro, main seat of the legislative power of the Mexican government.
- Archivo General de la Nación, General Archive of the Nation.
- Palacio de Lecumberri, former prison, now housing the Archivo General de la Nación.

== Exits ==
=== Line 1 ===
- Southwest: Avenida Zaragoza and Eje 3 Oriente Ing. Eduardo Molina, Colonia 10 de mayo
- Southeast: Terminal de Autobuses de Pasajeros de Oriente, Colonia 10 de mayo

=== Line B ===
- Avenida Ing. Eduardo Molina, Colonia 7 de julio

== Ridership ==
Annual passenger ridership (Line 1)
Year	Ridership	Average daily	Rank	% change	Ref.
2025	6,944,644	19,026	60/195	+38.62%
2024	5,009,771	13,687	97/195	+620.49%
2023	695,333	1,905	184/195	−81.05%
2022	3,669,786	10,054	117/195	−26.27%
2021	4,977,454	13,636	50/195	−17.73%
2020	6,050,167	16,530	43/195	−49.22%
2019	11,915,094	32,544	36/195	+1.44%
2018	11,745,396	32,179	36/195	+0.58%
2017	11,677,986	31,994	37/195	−1.86%
2016	11,898,758	32,510	36/195	+1.89%

Annual passenger ridership (Line B)
Year	Ridership	Average daily	Rank	% change	Ref.
2025	5,057,063	13,854	102/195	−15.00%
2024	5,949,148	16,254	76/195	−24.01%
2023	7,828,935	21,449	45/195	+36.37%
2022	5,740,753	15,728	68/195	+78.45%
2021	3,217,040	8,813	102/195	+19.13%
2020	2,700,556	7,378	132/195	−40.43%
2019	4,533,326	12,420	136/195	−0.18%
2018	4,541,276	12,441	134/195	−3.35%
2017	4,698,793	12,873	129/195	−18.18%
2016	5,742,892	15,690	115/195	+1.26%
