= Múzquiz metro station =

Mexico City Metro station

Múzquiz
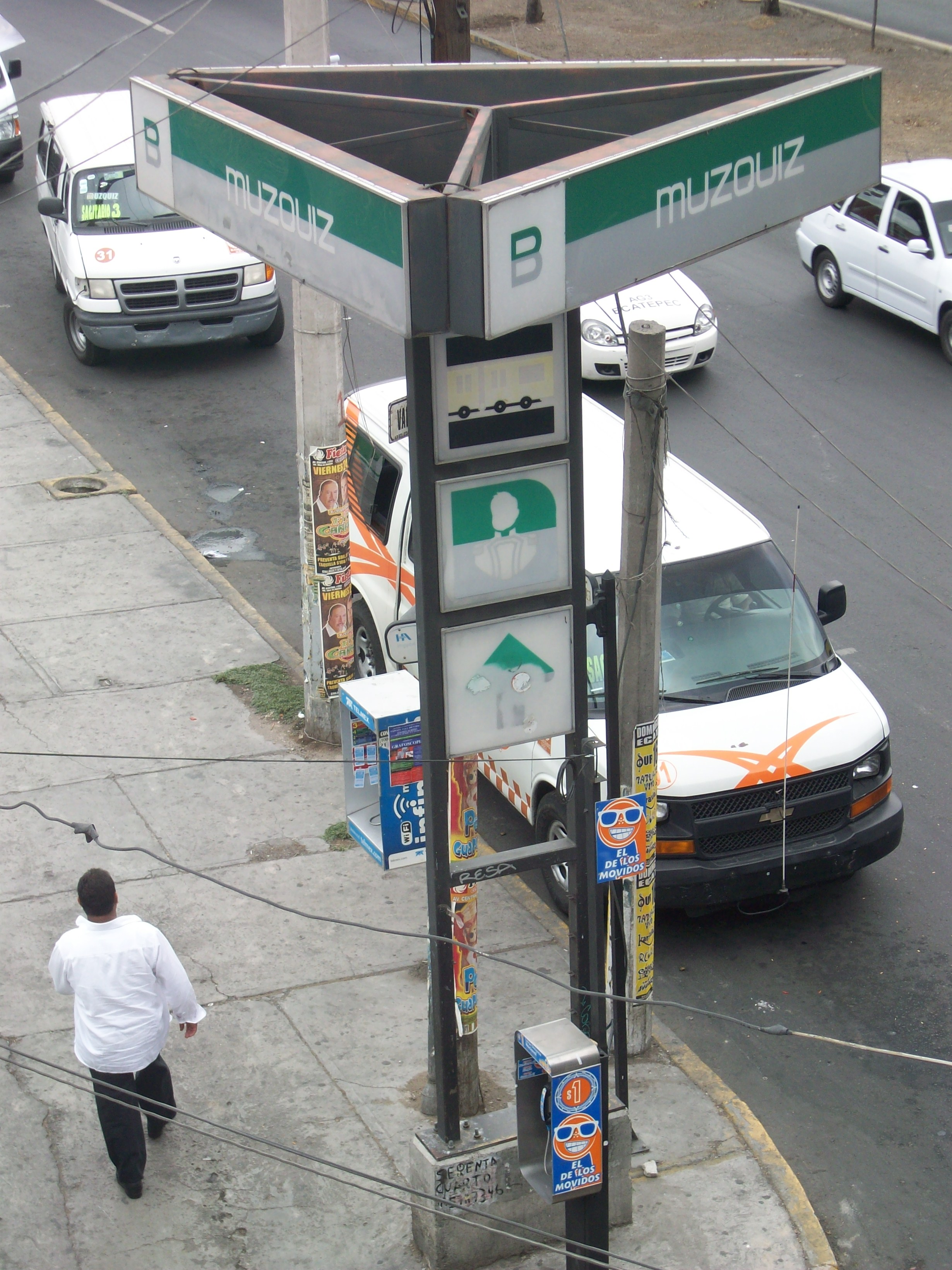
- Station sign, 2011

General information
- Location: Carlos Hank González Avenue; Ecatepec de Morelos, State of Mexico; Mexico
- Coordinates: 19°30′06″N 99°02′31″W
- System: Mexico City Metro
- Owner: Government of Mexico City
- Operator: Sistema de Transporte Colectivo (STC)
- Platforms: 1 island platform
- Tracks: 2

Construction
- Structure type: At grade
- Accessible: Partial

Other information
- Status: In service

History
- Opened: 30 November 2000

Passengers
- 2025: 8,631,839 (Note: The data here is limited to the most recent ten years to avoid excessive listings; earlier figures can be found in this page's history or on the Mexico City Metro website. To calculate the average daily ridership, the annual total is divided by 365 days (366 in leap years), with decimals omitted from the result. Each station per line is ranked individually, as the system counts transfer stations separately. The percentage change is calculated automatically using the data from the current year and the previous year.) ▼1.74%
- Rank: 41/195

Services
Preceding station	Mexico City Metro	Following station
Ecatepec toward Ciudad Azteca	Line B	Río de los Remedios toward Buenavista
Route map
Location
- Location within Mexico City urban area
- Area map

Múzquiz metro station (Note: Estación del Metro Múzquiz. Mexican Spanish pronunciation: ['mus.kis].) is a station of the Mexico City Metro in the colonia (neighborhood) of Valle de Aragón 3a. Sección, in Ecatepec de Morelos, State of Mexico, in the metropolitan area of Mexico City. It is an at-grade station with one island platform served by Line B (the Green-and-Gray Line), between Ecatepec and Río de los Remedios stations. The name of the station references the nearby colonia of Melchor Múzquiz, which in turn was named after Melchor de Eca y Múzquiz, the fifth president of Mexico; its pictogram depicts a representation of his bust. The station was opened on 30 November 2000, on the first day of service between Ciudad Azteca and Buenavista stations. The facilities are partially accessible to people with disabilities as there are tactile pavings and braille signage plates. In 2019, Múzquiz metro station had an average daily ridership of 30,812 passengers, making it the third-most used on the line.

== Location ==
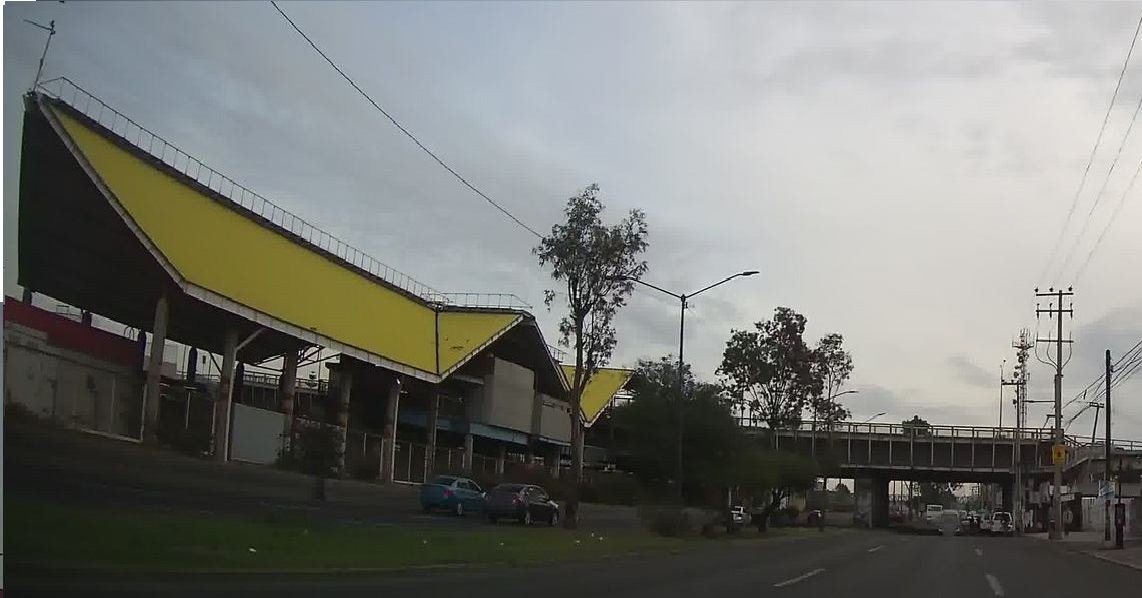
Múzquiz station lies along the intersection of the avenues Carlos Hank González (below) and Valle del Guadiana (the overpass).

Múzquiz is a metro station along Carlos Hank González Avenue (also known as Central Avenue), in Ecatepec de Morelos, State of Mexico, a municipality bordering Mexico City. The station serves the colonia (Mexican Spanish for "neighborhood") of Valle de Aragón 3a. Sección. Within the system, the station lies between Ecatepec and Río de los Remedios stations.

=== Exits ===
There are four exits:

- North: Carlos Hank González Avenue and Valle del Guadiana Avenue, Valle de Aragón 3a. Sección.
- Northeast: Carlos Hank González Avenue and Valle del Henares Avenue, Valle de Aragón 3a. Sección.
- South: Carlos Hank González Avenue and Valle del Guadiana Avenue, Valle de Aragón 3a. Sección.
- Southeast: Carlos Hank González Avenue and Valle del Guadiana Avenue, Valle de Aragón 3a. Sección.

== History and construction ==
Line B of the Mexico City Metro was built by Empresas ICA; Múzquiz metro station opened on 30 November 2000, on the first day of the Ciudad Azteca–Buenavista service. The station was built at-grade level; the Múzquiz–Ecatepec section is 1,485 meters (4,872 ft) long, while the opposite section towards Río de los Remedios metro station measures 1,155 meters (3,789 ft). The station is partially accessible to people with disabilities as there are tactile pavings and braille signage plates. The pedestrian bridges that connect the access to the station are adapted for bicycles as a bicycle lane was built in 2015 on the adjacent median strip. The station's pictogram features the silhouette of a portrait of Melchor de Eca y Múzquiz, the fifth president of Mexico, and is named after him because of the nearby colonia of Melchor Múzquiz.

== Ridership ==
According to the data provided by the authorities since the 2000s, and before the impact of the COVID-19 pandemic on public transport, commuters averaged per year between 30,200 and 34,800 daily entrances between 2013 and 2019; the station had a ridership of 11,246,650 passengers in 2019, which was an increase of 42,414 passengers compared to 2018. Also in 2019, Múzquiz metro station was the 39th busiest station of the system's 195 stations, and it was the line's third-most used, after Buenavista and Ciudad Azteca stations.

Annual passenger ridership
Year	Ridership	Average daily	Rank	% change	Ref.
2025	8,631,839	23,648	41/195	−1.74%	
2024	8,784,836	24,002	38/195	+1.25%	
2023	8,676,623	23,771	33/195	−4.41%	
2022	9,077,067	24,868	23/195	+26.02%	
2021	7,202,836	19,733	24/195	+54.55%	
2020	4,660,458	12,733	70/195	−58.56%	
2019	11,246,650	30,812	39/195	+0.38%	
2018	11,204,236	30,696	39/195	+1.50%	
2017	11,039,075	30,244	41/195	−7.85%	
2016	11,979,577	32,731	35/195	−0.10%	
