= Múzquiz =

Múzquiz may refer to:

- Múzquiz Municipality, a municipality of Coahuila, Mexico
- Santa Rosa de Múzquiz, a city and seat of the municipality of Múzquiz
- Múzquiz metro station, a station on the Mexico City metro system
- Melchor Múzquiz (1790–1844), a Mexican soldier and politician
- Pedro Mendinueta y Múzquiz, (1736–1825), viceroy of New Granada
- Raymie Muzquiz (b. 1960), an American animation director
