= Mexico City Metro Line B =

Metro line in Mexico City

Line B

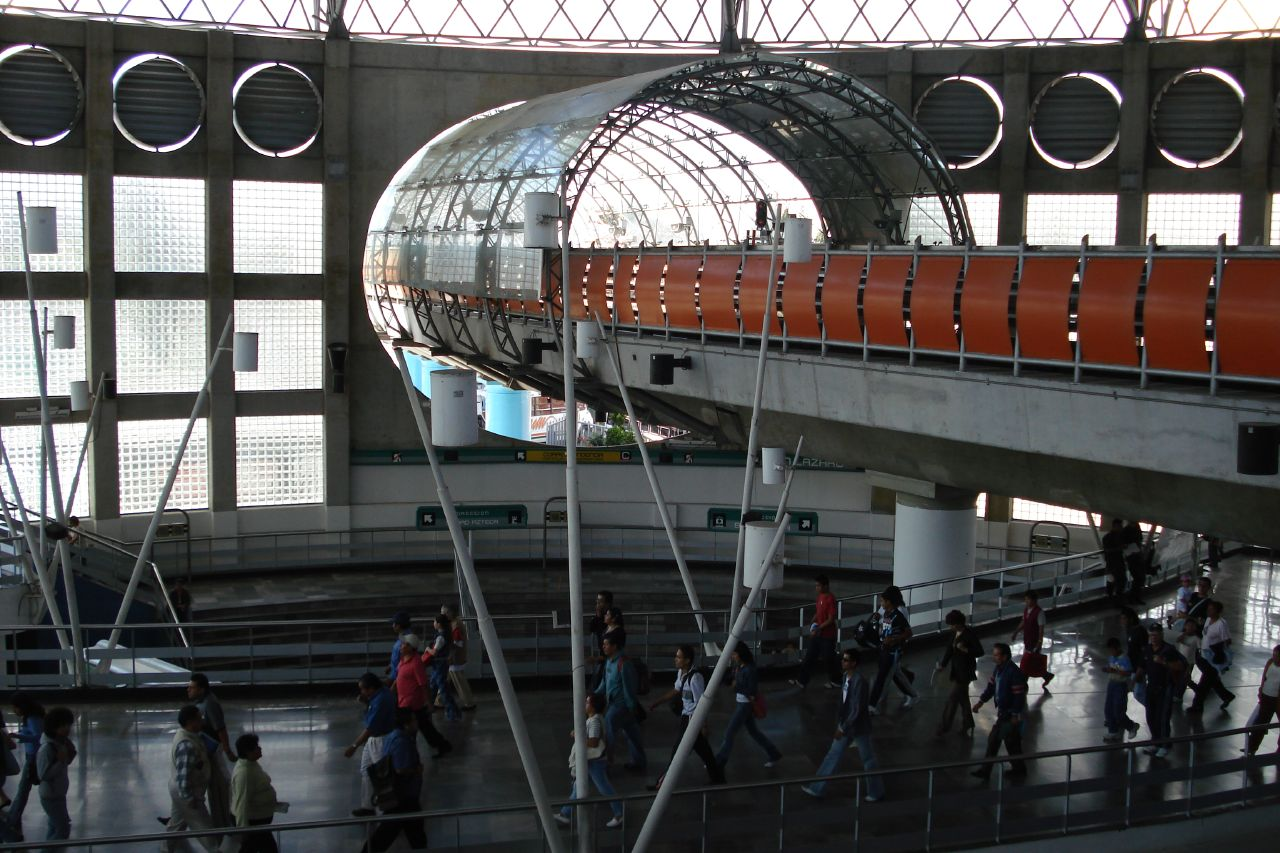
- San Lázaro station

Overview
- Locale: Mexico City
- Termini: Ciudad Azteca; Buenavista
- Connecting lines: at Oceanía; at Morelos; at San Lázaro; at Garibaldi / Lagunilla; at Guerrero
- Stations: 21
- Website: metro.cdmx.gob.mx

Service
- Type: Rapid transit
- System: Mexico City Metro
- Operator(s): Sistema de Transporte Colectivo (STC)
- Rolling stock: MP-68
- Ridership: 128,639,393 (2024)

History
- Opened: 15 December 1999; 26 years ago

Technical
- Line length: 20.278 km (12.6 mi)
- Track length: 23.722 km (14.7 mi)
- Number of tracks: 2
- Track gauge: 1,435 mm (4 ft 8 1/2 in) standard gauge with roll ways along track
- Electrification: Guide bar, 750 V DC
Route map
Line B route highlighted in gray

Mexico City Metro Line B is one of the twelve metro lines operating in Mexico City, Mexico. It has 21 stations and a total length of 23.772 km (14.771 mi), 20.278 km (12.600 mi) service the line while the rest are used for maneuvers. Opened the 15th December 1999, it is the eleventh line to join the network. It serves the boroughs of Cuauhtémoc, Venustiano Carranza and Gustavo A. Madero located within the Mexico City proper, as well as the municipaliyies of Nezahualcóyotl and Ecatepec corresponding to the State of Mexico. It has interchanges with five metro lines, and its distinctive graphic identity colors are dark gray and silver, and it is the only line to use two colours to identify itself. Up to the year 2021, it was the fourth line on the network with the highest ridership, accounting for 87.5 million passengers.

Line B runs from downtown Mexico City north towards the municipality of Ecatepec de Morelos.

Currently, it is the only line in the whole metro network to use two distinctive colors: green and gray.

Alongside Line 12, Line B is one of the two metro lines of the network to have the three type of stations: underground, elevated and surface.

== History ==
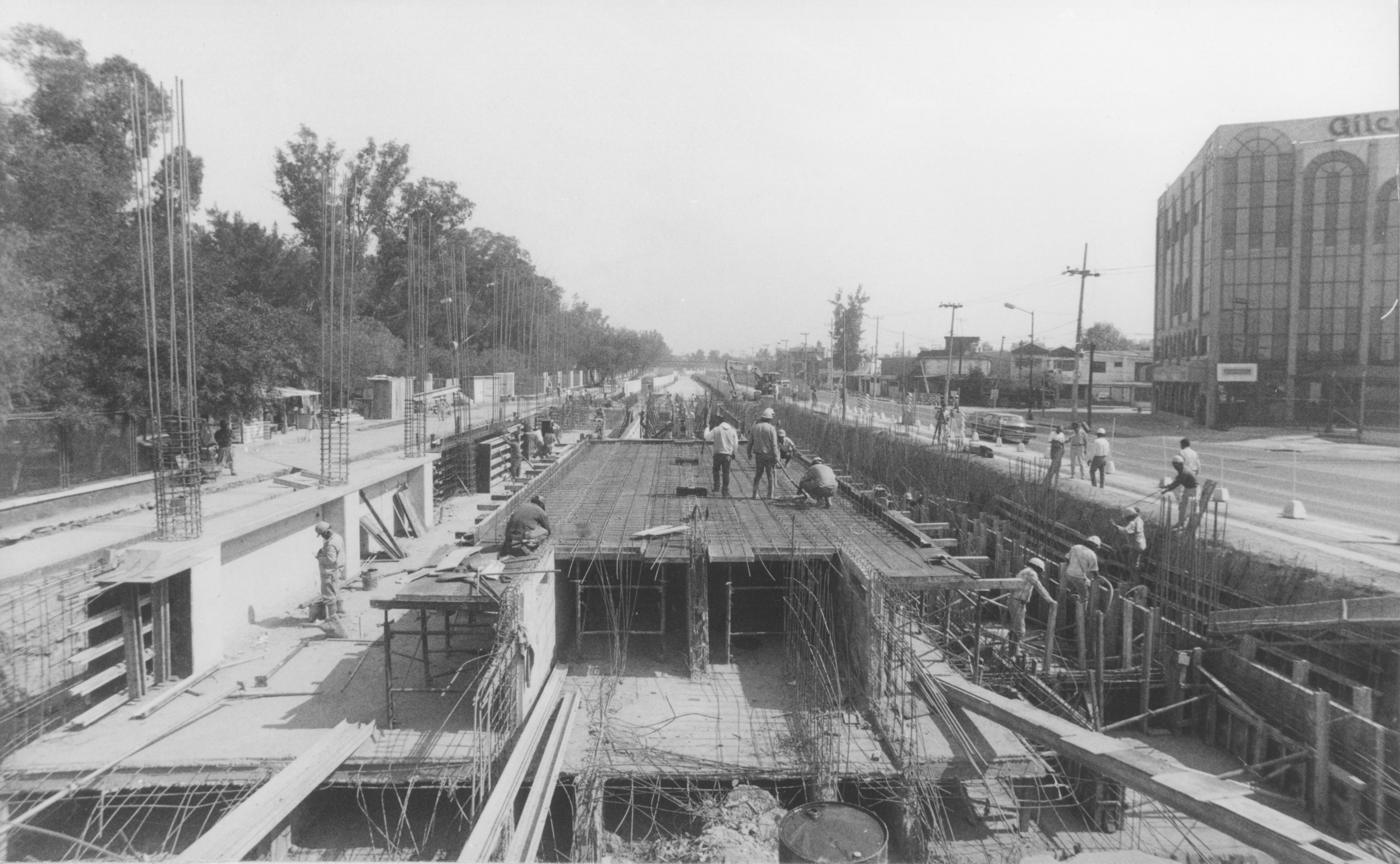
Line B under construction over Avenida Central in Ciudad Nezahualcóyotl.

Line B was planned as a feeder line that would connect Mexico City to the adjacent municipalities of the State of Mexico, such as Ecatepec de Morelos and Ciudad Nezahualcóyotl, therefore, instead of using the same numbering system as with the other metro lines, the line was named as Line B, same as in Line A, which connects Mexico City with the municipality of La Paz, also in the State of Mexico.

Line B was conceived in the early 1990s and was to originally named as Line 10. The 1994 Mexican peso crisis affected the construction of the line on its first stages as well as opposition from the citizens, specially those living in Santa María la Ribera, who claimed that Line B construction affected their houses, with damages such as sinking and breakage.

The first stretch of the line, from Buenavista to Villa de Aragón, was inaugurated on 15 December 1999 by Ernesto Zedillo, President of Mexico from 1994 to 2000, and Rosario Robles, Head of Government of the Federal District from 1991 to 2000. The second section, from Villa de Aragón to Ciudad Azteca, was opened on 30 November 2000, six years after it was planned.

An extension for Line B is planned, adding two more stations to expand the line westbound towards Colegio Militar, where line B would connect with Line 2.

== Chronology ==
- 15 December 1999: from Villa de Aragón to Buenavista
- 30 November 2000: from Ciudad Azteca to Nezahualcóyotl

== Rolling stock ==
- Alstom MP-68: 1999–present

Out of the 390 trains in the Mexico City Metro network, 36 are in service in Line B.

== Station list ==
Key (Note: The following list was adapted from different websites and official maps.: Metro connections obtained from the official Mexico City Metro system map.; Accessibility obtained from the Mexico City Metro system map. In some cases, the map omits the accessibility icon as the station(s) are actually partially accessible. However, the respective websites of each station on the official site indicate the respective accessibility methods. Stations with the symbol ‡ are fully accessible; stations with the symbol † are partially accessible.; Cablebús obtained from their official website.; Centro de transferencia modal (CETRAM;) obtained from the official website of the Órgano Regulador de Transporte.; Ecobici obtained from their official website.; Metrobús obtained from the Mexico City Metrobús system map.; Mexibús obtained from the official Mexico City Metro system map.; Mexicable obtained from the official Mexico City Metro system map.; Public buses network (peseros) obtained from the official website of the Órgano Regulador de Transporte.; Red de Transporte de Pasajeros obtained from their official website.; Trolleybuses obtained from their official website.)
Handicapped/disabled access	Fully accessible station	Cablebús Line {{{3}}}	Cablebús connection	Red de Transporte de Pasajeros	RTP connection
Handicapped/disabled access	Partially accessible station	Mexibús	Mexibús connection	Tren Interurbano	Tren Interurbano connection
Transfer hub	CETRAM transfer station	Mexicable	Mexicable connection	Tren Suburbano	Tren Suburbano connection
Transfer hub	ETRAM transfer station	Mexico City Metro	Mexico City Metro connection	Trolleybus	Trolleybus connection
Ecobici	Ecobici bikeshare	Mexico City minubus	Pesero connection	Xochimilco Light Rail	Xochimilco Light Rail connection

The stations from east to west and from south to north.

No.	Station	Date opened	Level	Distance (km)		Connection	Pictogram	Location	
No.	Station	Date opened	Level	Between stations	Total	Connection	Pictogram	Location	
01	Ciudad Azteca ‡	30 November 2000	Ground-level, overground access	-	0.0	Mexibús Mexibús Line 1	Silhouette of the neighborhood's glyph	Ecatepec de Morelos	State of Mexico
02	Plaza Aragón ‡	30 November 2000	Ground-level, overground access	0.7	0.7		A stand of pots from a tianguis	Ecatepec de Morelos	State of Mexico
03	Olímpica †	30 November 2000	Ground-level, overground access	0.9	1.6		Olympic rings	Ecatepec de Morelos	State of Mexico
04	Ecatepec †	30 November 2000	Ground-level, overground access	0.7	2.3		Ehecatépetl	Ecatepec de Morelos	State of Mexico
05	Múzquiz †	30 November 2000	Ground-level, overground access	1.6	3.9		A bust of Melchor Múzquiz	Ecatepec de Morelos	State of Mexico
06	Río de los Remedios †	30 November 2000	Ground-level, overground access	1.3	5.2		Sailboat	Nezahualcóyotl	State of Mexico
07	Impulsora †	30 November 2000	Ground-level, overground access	0.6	5.8		Cart with an old hacienda	Nezahualcóyotl	State of Mexico
08	Nezahualcóyotl †	30 November 2000	Ground-level, overground access	1.5	7.3		A coyote's head	Nezahualcóyotl	State of Mexico
09	Villa de Aragón ‡	15 December 1999	Ground-level, overground access	1.5	8.8	12; 15A, 15C	A collection of houses	Gustavo A. Madero	Mexico City
10	Bosque de Aragón †	15 December 1999	Ground-level, overground access	0.9	9.7	12	Three forest trees	Gustavo A. Madero	Mexico City
11	Deportivo Oceanía †	15 December 1999	Ground-level, overground access	1.3	11.0	11A, 12, 43; 7B, 7D	Koala holding a soccer ball	Gustavo A. Madero	Mexico City
12	Oceanía †	15 December 1999	Elevated, overground access	1.0	12.0	43, 200; 10D	Kangaroo	Gustavo A. Madero	Mexico City
13	Romero Rubio †	15 December 1999	Elevated, overground access	1.0	13.0	10B, 18	Silhouette of a bust of Romero Rubio	Venustiano Carranza	Mexico City
14	Ricardo Flores Magón †	15 December 1999	Elevated, overground access	1.1	14.1		Portrait of Ricardo Flores Magón	Venustiano Carranza	Mexico City
15	San Lázaro ‡	15 December 1999	Elevated, overground access	1.1	15.2	East Bus Terminal (TAPO)	Steam locomotive	Venustiano Carranza	Mexico City
16	Morelos †	15 December 1999	Underground, trench	1.4	16.6	18, 37; 5A, 10E	Profile of José María Morelos	Venustiano Carranza	Mexico City
17	Tepito †	15 December 1999	Underground, trench	0.6	17.2	18, 33; 10E, 11C	Boxing glove	Cuauhtémoc	Mexico City
18	Lagunilla	15 December 1999	Underground, trench	0.8	18.0	18; 10E, 11C	Wild duck	Cuauhtémoc	Mexico City
19	Garibaldi/Lagunilla †	15 December 1999	Underground, trench	0.6	18.6	18, 27A; 10E, 11C	A guitar and a sarape	Cuauhtémoc	Mexico City
20	Guerrero ‡	15 December 1999	Underground, trench	0.9	19.5	10E, 11C	Bust of Vincente Guerrero	Cuauhtémoc	Mexico City
21	Buenavista ‡	15 December 1999	Underground, trench	0.7	20.2	(at Buenavista); 10E, 11C, 12B; (at distance)	Diesel locomotive	Cuauhtémoc	Mexico City

=== Renamed stations ===
Date	Old name	New name
2002	Continentes	Nezahualcóyotl
2008	Tecnológico	Ecatepec

== Ridership ==
The following table shows each of Line B stations total and average daily ridership during 2019.

†	Transfer station
‡	Terminal

Rank	Station	Total ridership	Average daily
1	Buenavista‡	21,907,761	60,021
2	Ciudad Azteca‡	21,410,326	58,658
3	Múzquiz	11,246,650	30,813
4	Ecatepec	9,740,169	26,685
5	Impulsora	9,105,811	24,947
6	Lagunilla	8,394,391	22,998
7	Nezahualcóyotl	8,378,849	22,956
8	Tepito	8,233,487	22,557
9	Río de los Remedios	7,330,993	20,085
10	Plaza Aragón	7,198,356	19,722
11	Olímpica	6,112,152	16,746
12	Deportivo Oceanía	5,731,450	15,703
13	Villa de Aragón	5,398,782	14,791
14	San Lázaro†	4,533,326	12,420
15	Oceanía†	3,788,470	10,379
16	Romero Rubio	2,925,132	8,014
17	Garibaldi / Lagunilla†	2,709,631	7,424
18	Bosque de Aragón	2,193,804	6,010
19	Ricardo Flores Magón	2,142,619	5,870
20	Guerrero†	2,090,890	5,728
21	Morelos†	1,972,909	5,405
Total		152,545,958	417,934

== Tourism ==
Line B passes near several places of interest:

- Plaza Garibaldi, a square known as Mexico City's home of mariachi music where mariachi bands can be found playing or soliciting gigs from visitors.
- Historic center of Mexico City

== Crime ==
On its route, Line B passes through some places known for their levels of crime including Ecatepec de Morelos, Gustavo A. Madero, Venustiano Carranza, and neighborhoods such as Tepito and Colonia Morelos. Due to this, the line has a high rate of crime inside the stations and the trains, going from the presence of pickpockets and petty theft to armed robbery and sexual assault.

In 2017, at least three violent robberies were reported, in which armed men entered the wagons and stripped the passengers out of their belongings.

== See also ==
- List of Mexico City Metro lines
