= Mexico City Metrobús Line 4 =

Bus rapid transit line

Metrobús Line 4
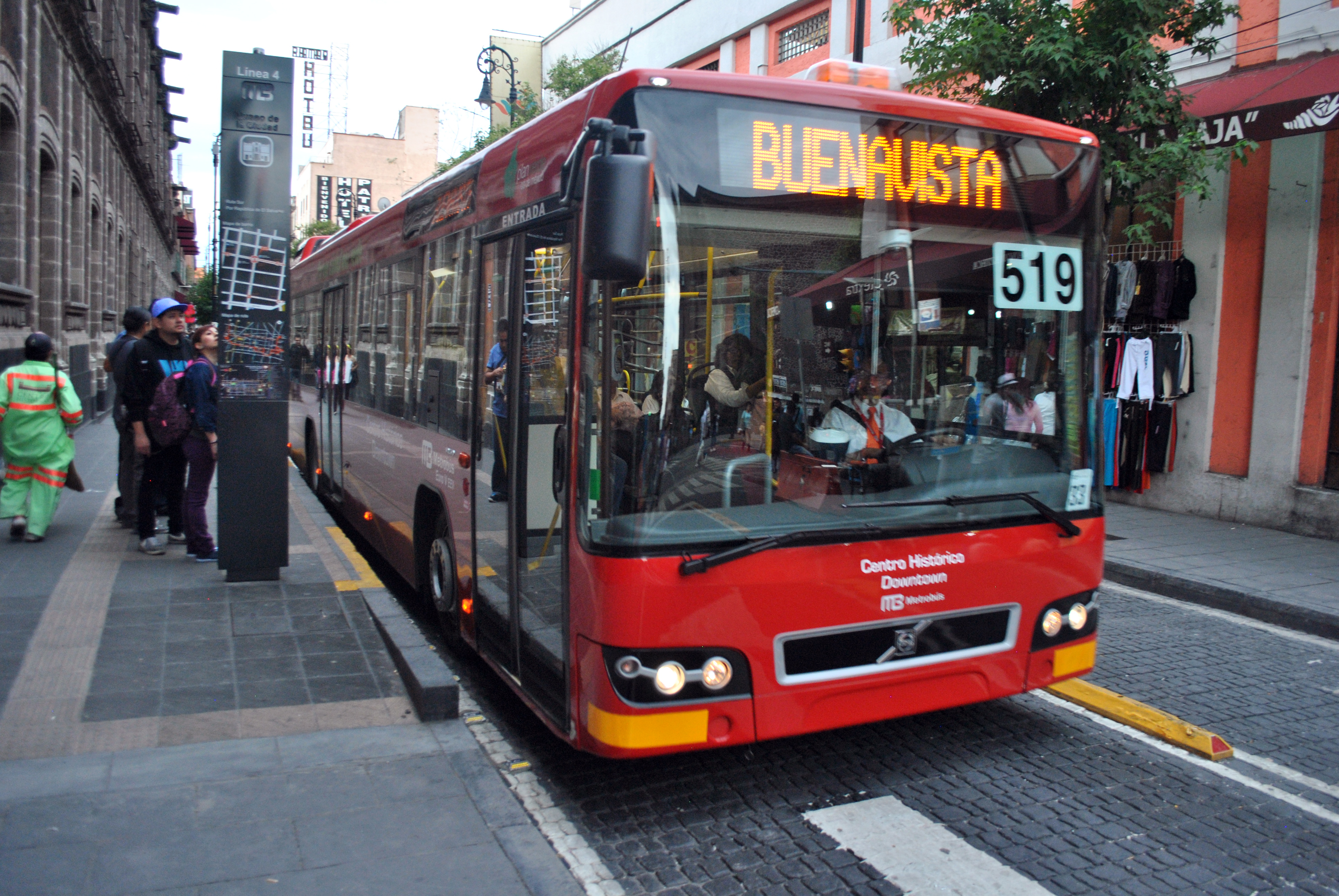
- Bus at the Museo de la Ciudad station

Overview
- Status: In service
- Termini: Buenavista / Pantitlán / Alameda Oriente; San Lázaro / AICM Terminal 2 / Hidalgo
- Stations: 43
- Website: Línea 4

Service
- Type: Bus rapid transit
- System: Mexico City Metrobus
- Services: 5
- Operator(s): See Operators
- Daily ridership: 65,000

History
- Opened: April 1, 2012; 14 years ago

Technical
- Line length: 40.5 km (25.2 mi)
- Character: Exclusive right-of-way

The Mexico City Metrobús Line 4 is a bus rapid transit line in the Mexico City Metrobus. It operates between Colonia Buenavista, in central Mexico City and the Mexico City International Airport in the Venustiano Carranza borough, in the east of the capital.

Line 4 has a total of 43 stations and a length of 40.5 kilometers divided into two routes, called the North and South routes, and goes mainly through Mexico City's downtown towards and from Mexico City International Airport.

Construction of Line 4 started on July 4, 2011 and it was inaugurated on April 1, 2012 by Marcelo Ebrard, Head of Government of the Federal District from 2006 to 2012.

== Service description ==
=== Services ===
The line has three itineraries and two routes: North and South.

Amajac to Terminal 2 (South route)

To Terminal 2
- First Bus: 4:37 (Monday-Friday)
- Last Bus: 23:21 (Monday-Friday)
- First Bus: 4:38 (Saturday)
- Last Bus: 23:19 (Saturday)
- First Bus: 4:40 (Sunday)
- Last Bus: 23:19 (Sunday)

To Amajac
- First Bus: 4:32 (Monday-Friday)
- Last Bus: 0:00 (Monday-Friday)
- First Bus: 5:31 (Saturday)
- Last Bus: 23:30 (Saturday)
- First Bus:14:38 (Sunday)
- Last Bus: 23:32 (Sunday)

Buenavista to San Lázaro (South route)

To San Lázaro
- First Bus: 4:30 (Monday-Friday)
- Last Bus: 00:30 (Monday-Friday)
- First Bus: 4:30 (Saturday)
- Last Bus: 00:30 (Saturday)
- First Bus: 5:00 (Sunday)
- Last Bus: 00:36 (Sunday)

To Buenavista
- First Bus: 4:28 (Monday-Friday)
- Last Bus: 00:15 (Monday-Friday)
- First Bus: 4:28 (Saturday)
- Last Bus: 00:15 (Saturday)
- First Bus: 5:00 (Sunday)
- Last Bus: 00:30 (Sunday)

Buenavista to San Lázaro (North route)

To San Lázaro
- First Bus: 4:30 (Monday-Friday)
- Last Bus: 00:35 (Monday-Friday)
- First Bus: 4:30 (Saturday)
- Last Bus: 00:35 (Saturday)
- First Bus: 5:00 (Sunday)
- Last Bus: 00:36 (Sunday)

To Buenavista
- First Bus: 4:27 (Monday-Friday)
- Last Bus: 00:12 (Monday-Friday)
- First Bus: 4:27 (Saturday)
- Last Bus: 00:12 (Saturday)
- First Bus: 5:00 (Sunday)
- Last Bus: 00:30 (Sunday)

Pantitlán to Hidalgo

To Hidalgo

- First Bus: 4:30 (Monday-Friday)
- Last Bus: 22:59 (Monday-Friday)
- First Bus: 4:30 (Saturday)
- Last Bus: 22:59 (Saturday)
- First Bus: 5:00 (Sunday)
- Last Bus: 23:04 (Sunday)

To Pantitlán

- First Bus: 5:04 (Monday-Friday)
- Last Bus: 22:33 (Monday-Friday)
- First Bus: 5:04 (Saturday)
- Last Bus: 23:33 (Saturday)
- First Bus: 5:30 (Sunday)
- Last Bus: 23:35 (Sunday)

Alameda Oriente to Hidalgo

To Hidalgo

- First Bus: 4:30 (Monday-Friday)
- Last Bus: 22:59 (Monday-Friday)
- First Bus: 4:30 (Saturday)
- Last Bus: 22:59 (Saturday)
- First Bus: 5:00 (Sunday)
- Last Bus: 23:58 (Sunday)

To Alameda Oriente

- First Bus: 5:20 (Monday-Friday)
- Last Bus: 23:40 (Monday-Friday)
- First Bus: 5:20 (Saturday)
- Last Bus: 23:40 (Saturday)
- First Bus: 5:51 (Sunday)
- Last Bus: 23:49 (Sunday)

Line 4 services the Cuauhtémoc and Venustiano Carranza boroughs.

=== Station list ===
Key (Note: The following list was adapted from different websites and official maps.: Metro connections obtained from the official Mexico City Metro system map.; Accessibility obtained from the Mexico City Metro system map. In some cases, the map omits the accessibility icon as the station(s) are actually partially accessible. However, the respective websites of each station on the official site indicate the respective accessibility methods. Stations with the symbol ‡ are fully accessible; stations with the symbol † are partially accessible.; Cablebús obtained from their official website.; Centro de transferencia modal (CETRAM;) obtained from the official website of the Órgano Regulador de Transporte.; Ecobici obtained from their official website.; Metrobús obtained from the Mexico City Metrobús system map.; Mexibús obtained from the official Mexico City Metro system map.; Mexicable obtained from the official Mexico City Metro system map.; Public buses network (peseros) obtained from the official website of the Órgano Regulador de Transporte.; Red de Transporte de Pasajeros obtained from their official website.; Trolleybuses obtained from their official website.)
Handicapped/disabled access	Fully accessible station	Cablebús Line {{{3}}}	Cablebús connection	Red de Transporte de Pasajeros	RTP connection
Handicapped/disabled access	Partially accessible station	Mexibús	Mexibús connection	Tren Interurbano	Tren Interurbano connection
Transfer hub	CETRAM transfer station	Mexicable	Mexicable connection	Tren Suburbano	Tren Suburbano connection
Transfer hub	ETRAM transfer station	Mexico City Metro	Mexico City Metro connection	Trolleybus	Trolleybus connection
Ecobici	Ecobici bikeshare	Mexico City minubus	Pesero connection	Xochimilco Light Rail	Xochimilco Light Rail connection

==== North route ====
Station (Note: All the stations are fully accessible to people with disabilities.)	North	Alameda Oriente– Hidalgo	Connections	Neighborhood(s)	Borough(s)	Picture	Date opened
Buenavista	●		(at Buenavista); 10E, 11C, 12B; (at distance)	Buenavista	Cuauhtémoc		April 1, 2012
Alcaldía Cuauhtémoc	●		(at El Chopo)	Buenavista	Cuauhtémoc		April 1, 2012
México Tenochtitlan (Note: Formerly named "Puente de Alvarado".)	●		(at Revolución); (at Revolución); 12B (at distance), 16A, 16B; (at distance)	Buenavista; Tabacalera	Cuauhtémoc		April 1, 2012
Museo San Carlos	●		Ecobici	Buenavista; Tabacalera	Cuauhtémoc		April 1, 2012
Hidalgo	●	●	27A; 16A; (at distance)	Guerrero; Centro	Cuauhtémoc		April 1, 2012
Bellas Artes	●	●	16A	Guerrero; Centro	Cuauhtémoc		April 1, 2012
Teatro Blanquita	●	●	(at República de Perú)	Centro	Cuauhtémoc		April 1, 2012
República de Chile	●	●		Centro	Cuauhtémoc		April 1, 2012
República de Argentina	●	●		Centro	Cuauhtémoc		April 1, 2012
Mercado Abelardo L. Rodríguez (Note: Formerly named "Teatro del Pueblo".)	●	●		Centro	Cuauhtémoc		April 1, 2012
Mixcalco	●	●		Centro	Cuauhtémoc/ Venustiano Carranza		April 1, 2012
Ferrocarril de Cintura	●	●		Centro; Ampliación Penitenciaria	Venustiano Carranza		April 1, 2012
Mercado Morelos	●	●	(at Morelos); 18 (at distance), 37; 5A, 10E (at distance)	Ampliación Penitenciaria; Morelos	Venustiano Carranza		April 1, 2012
Archivo General de la Nación	●	●	Mexico City Metrobús Mexico City Metrobús Line 5	Ampliación Penitenciaria; Penitenciaria	Venustiano Carranza		April 1, 2012
San Lázaro	●		East Bus Terminal (TAPO)	7 de Julio	Venustiano Carranza		April 1, 2012
Terminal 1 (Note: Accessible from Amajac–Terminal 2 route (with additional cost).)	●		Mexico City Airport; Aerotrén (at distance); (at Terminal Aérea); 43, 200; (at Terminal Aérea); 20B	Mexico City International Airport	Venustiano Carranza		April 1, 2012
Terminal 2	●		Mexico City Airport; Aerotren	Mexico City International Airport	Venustiano Carranza		April 1, 2012
Pantitlán		●	168; 11B, 11C, 19F, 19G	Adolfo López Mateos; Aviación Civil; Pantitlán	Venustiano Carranza		3 June 2021
Calle 6		●	Mexibús Mexibús Line 3	Cuchilla Pantitlán	Venustiano Carranza		27 March 2022
Alameda Oriente		●	47A	Arsenal 4ta Sección	Venustiano Carranza		27 March 2022

==== South route ====
Since the route has a complex route with several one-way stations, the following table will start at the Buenavista Terminal Station and follow an eastward flow until reaching the San Lázaro Terminal Station, then follow the route westward culminating with the 20 de Noviembre station.

Station	Eastbound	Westbound	Connections	Neighborhood(s)	Borough(s)	Picture	Date opened
Buenavista	●	●	(at Buenavista); 10E, 11C, 12B; (at distance)	Buenavista	Cuauhtémoc		April 1, 2012
Alcaldía Cuauhtémoc	●	●	(at El Chopo)	Buenavista	Cuauhtémoc		April 1, 2012
México Tenochtitlan	●	●	(at Revolución); (at Revolución); 12B (at distance), 16A, 16B; (at distance)	Buenavista; Tabacalera	Cuauhtémoc		April 1, 2012
Plaza de la República	●	●	Route: 12B; (at distance)	Buenavista; Tabacalera	Cuauhtémoc		April 1, 2012
Amajac (Note: Formerly named "Glorieta de Colón".)	●	●	Mexico City Metrobús Mexico City Metrobús Line 7 Ecobici	Tabacalera	Cuauhtémoc		April 1, 2012
Defensoría Pública (Note: Formerly named "Expo Reforma".)	●	●		Juárez; Centro	Cuauhtémoc		April 1, 2012
Vocacional 5	●	●		Centro	Cuauhtémoc		April 1, 2012
Juárez	●	●	Mexico City Metro Line 3 Mexico City Metrobús Mexico City Metrobús Line 3 Ecobici	Centro	Cuauhtémoc		April 1, 2012
Mercado San Juan (Note: Formerly named "Plaza San Juan".)	●	●	Ecobici	Centro	Cuauhtémoc		April 1, 2012
Eje Central	●	●	(at San Juan de Letrán); (at República de Uruguay)	Centro	Cuauhtémoc		April 1, 2012
El Salvador	●	●		Centro	Cuauhtémoc		April 1, 2012
Isabel la Católica	●	●		Centro	Cuauhtémoc		April 1, 2012
Museo de la Ciudad	●		145A	Centro	Cuauhtémoc		April 1, 2012
Pino Suárez	●		Nezahualcóyotl (at distance); 2A, 31B, 111A, 145A; 17C, 17H, 17I, 19E, 19F, 19G, 19H	Centro	Cuauhtémoc		April 1, 2012
Las Cruces (Note: Formerly named "Las Cruces Sur".)	●			Centro	Cuauhtémoc		April 1, 2012
La Merced	●		(at Merced); 5A	Centro	Venustiano Carranza		April 1, 2012
Mercado de Sonora	●			Centro	Venustiano Carranza		April 1, 2012
Cecilio Robelo	●	●	(at Candelaria); 37; 5A	Del Parque	Venustiano Carranza		April 1, 2012
Eduardo Molina	●			Del Parque	Venustiano Carranza		April 1, 2012
Moctezuma	●	●	19E, 19F, 19G, 19H (all at distance)	Del Parque; Jardín Balbuena	Venustiano Carranza		April 1, 2012
San Lázaro	●	●	East Bus Terminal (TAPO)	7 de Julio	Venustiano Carranza		April 1, 2012
Hospital Balbuena		●		Del Parque	Venustiano Carranza		April 1, 2012
Mercado de Sonora Sur		●		Centro	Venustiano Carranza		November 28, 2022
San Pablo		●		Centro	Cuauhtémoc		November 28, 2022
Pino Suárez Sur		●	Nezahualcóyotl (at distance); 2A, 31B, 111A, 145A; 17C, 17H, 17I, 19E, 19F, 19G, 19H	Centro	Cuauhtémoc		November 28, 2022
20 de Noviembre		●	(at Zócalo/Tenochtitlan); 145A	Centro	Cuauhtémoc		November 28, 2022

==== Replacement of stations ====
On November 28, 2022, five eastward bus stops were removed. Mercado de Sonora, La Merced, Mercado Ampudia, (Note: Previously "Circunvalación".) Las Cruces Norte and Museo de la Ciudad stations were relocated southbound due to traffic jams caused by their location in the market area of the historic center of the city.

== Operator ==
Conexión Centro-Aeropuerto, SA de CV (CCA) is the sole operator of Line 4.
