= Mexico City Metrobús =

Road-based rapid transit system

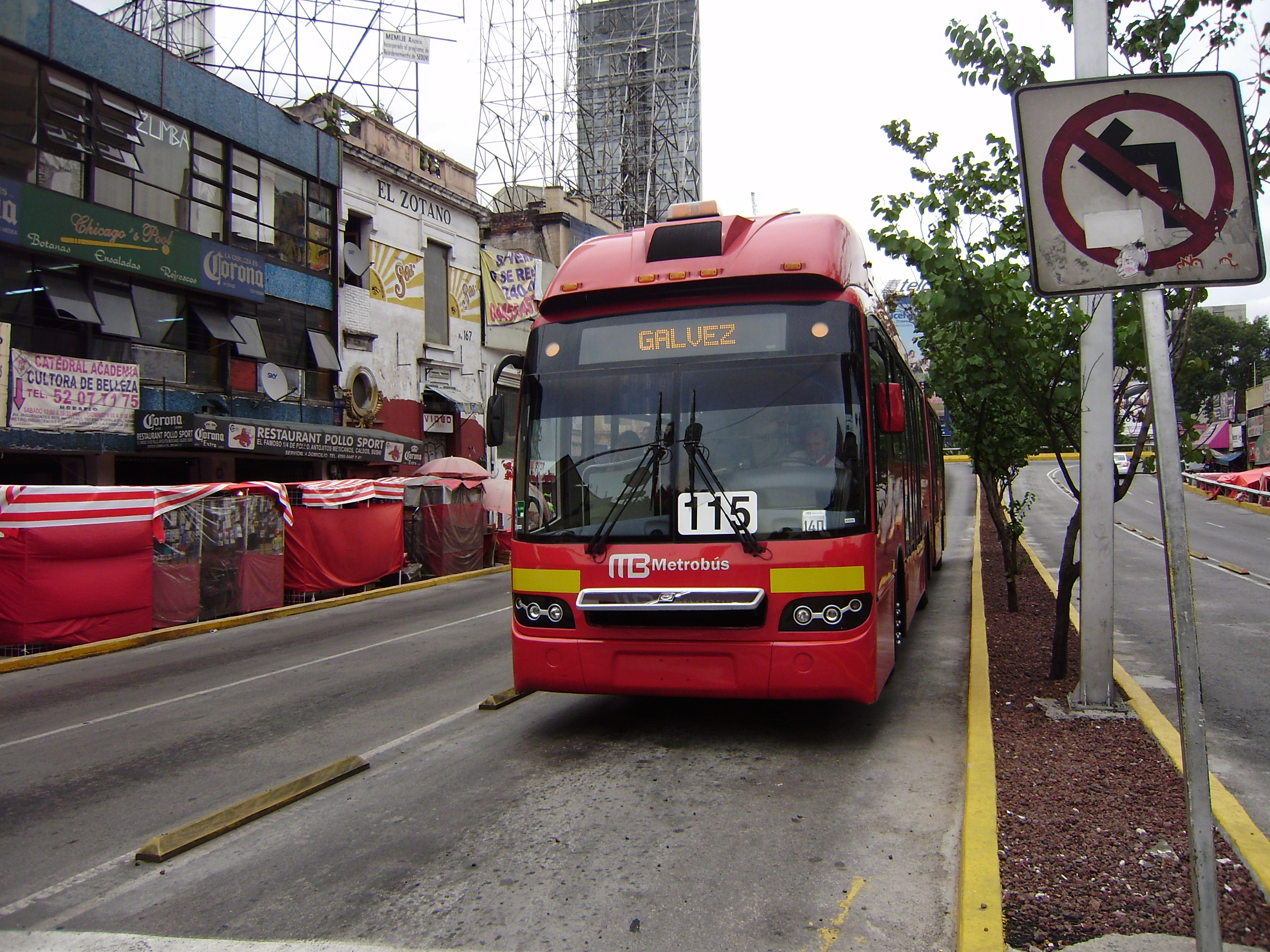
- Metrobús on Insurgentes station
- Founded: 2005; 21 years ago
- Locale: Mexico City
- Service type: Bus rapid transit
- Routes: 7
- Stations: 284
- Fleet: 720
- Daily ridership: 1,800,000 daily (est. 2018)
- Fuel type: Diesel and Electric
- Chief executive: María del Rosario Castro Escorcia
- Website: www.metrobus.cdmx.gob.mx (in Spanish)

The Mexico City Metrobús (former official name Sistema de Corredores de Transporte Público de Pasajeros del Distrito Federal), simply known as Metrobús, is a bus rapid transit (BRT) system that has served Mexico City since line 1 opened on 19 June 2005. As of February 2018, it consists of seven lines that cross the city and connects with other forms of transit, such as the Mexico City Metro. The most recent line to open was line 7, running for the first time double-decker buses along the city's iconic boulevard, Paseo de la Reforma.

In 2016, Metrobús carried on average 1,152,603 passengers on weekdays.

== Impact ==
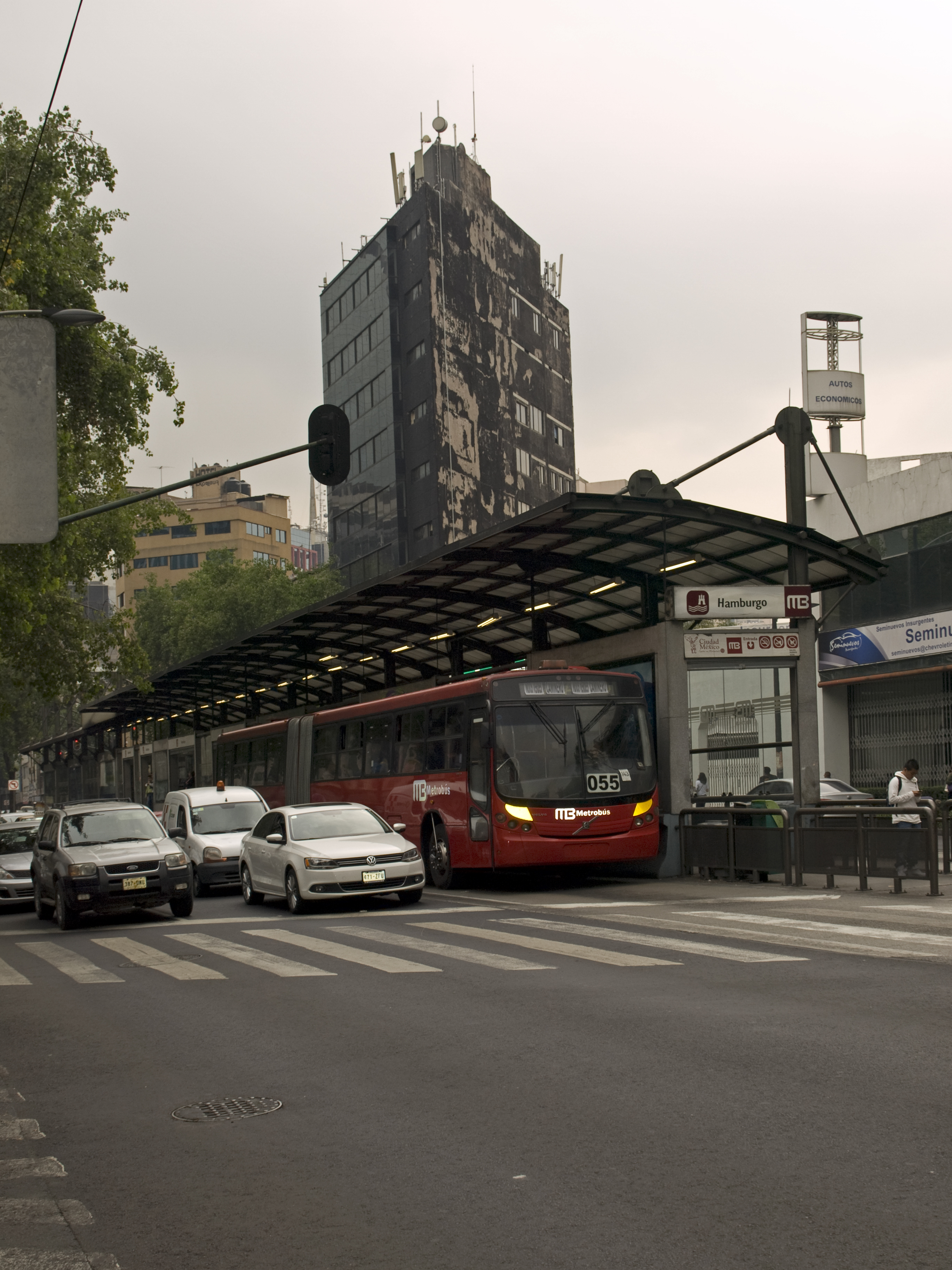
Hamburgo Station

Line 1 replaced 372 standard buses and microbuses that served Avenida de los Insurgentes with 212 articulated buses that run at an average speed of 20 km/h (12 mph), doing 60 km/h (37 mph) as maximum. Doing so, travel times along the corridor were reduced up to 50%.

Besides addressing the bus service problem, the Metrobús project emerged in the context of the city's efforts to reduce air pollution with a program called Proaire 2002–2010. According to Metrobús, annual environmental benefits include a reduction of 35,400 long tons (36,000 t) of carbon dioxide, 9,700 long tons (9,900 t) of carbon monoxide, 206 long tons (209 t) of NOx, and 1.27 long tons (1.29 t) of PM10 particulates.

The BRT-corridor Line 3 is going to become fully electric in the course of 2023. This will reduce air pollution and enhance climate protection.

== Passenger access and payment ==
Ticketing is by pre-paid proximity smartcard, which travellers have to pass through turnstiles at the entry to the separated bus platforms. During the early months of the system's operations, limited availability of the cards required a temporary method for access to the system involving purchasing a normal single-trip paper ticket at a cost of MXN$4.50. Starting in October 2005, and with smartcard supply able to cover the demand, access is done exclusively by using the card.

As of 2022, the single-trip cost is MXN6.00 (USD0.3). A new MB smartcard, preloaded with one voyage, can be purchased for MXN15.00 and "recharged" for MXN6.00 per trip. There is a supplemental fee of MXN30.00 for trips to or from the airport.

The smartcard system has generated controversy, especially from occasional and one-time users who complain about the MXN15.00 fee for a single-voyage card, for this is common that sometimes people ask others who have the smartcard to charge for them a trip.

Service is free for those over 70 years old, or disabled, as well as for children under 5 accompanied by an adult.

== Lines and hours ==
=== Line 1 ===

The line starts at Metro Indios Verdes, a large multimodal transport node in the Gustavo A. Madero borough. From there it runs south, through Cuauhtémoc and Benito Juárez, before terminating in the La Joya district of Tlalpan borough, providing a total of 45 stations. It was built in two sections, with a split at Metro Insurgentes, the notional dividing point between the avenue's northern and southern stretches, just south of where Avenida Insurgentes intersects with Paseo de la Reforma.

The first line covers a distance of up to 30 kilometres (19 mi), running in a dedicated bus lane built within the central reservation (median) of Avenida de los Insurgentes. Avenida Insurgentes is one of the city's main north–south arterial routes, constitutes a section of the Pan-American Highway, and is reputed to be the longest urban avenue in the world.

On its route south from Indios Verdes, the Metrobús also connects with Metro stations at Deportivo 18 de Marzo, Potrero, La Raza, Buenavista, Revolución, Insurgentes, and Chilpancingo, providing connections with Metro Lines 1, 2, 3, 5, 6, and 9. The proposed southward extension of Mexico City Metro Line 7 will also enable that line to connect at the Metrobús' original southernmost station, Doctor Gálvez.

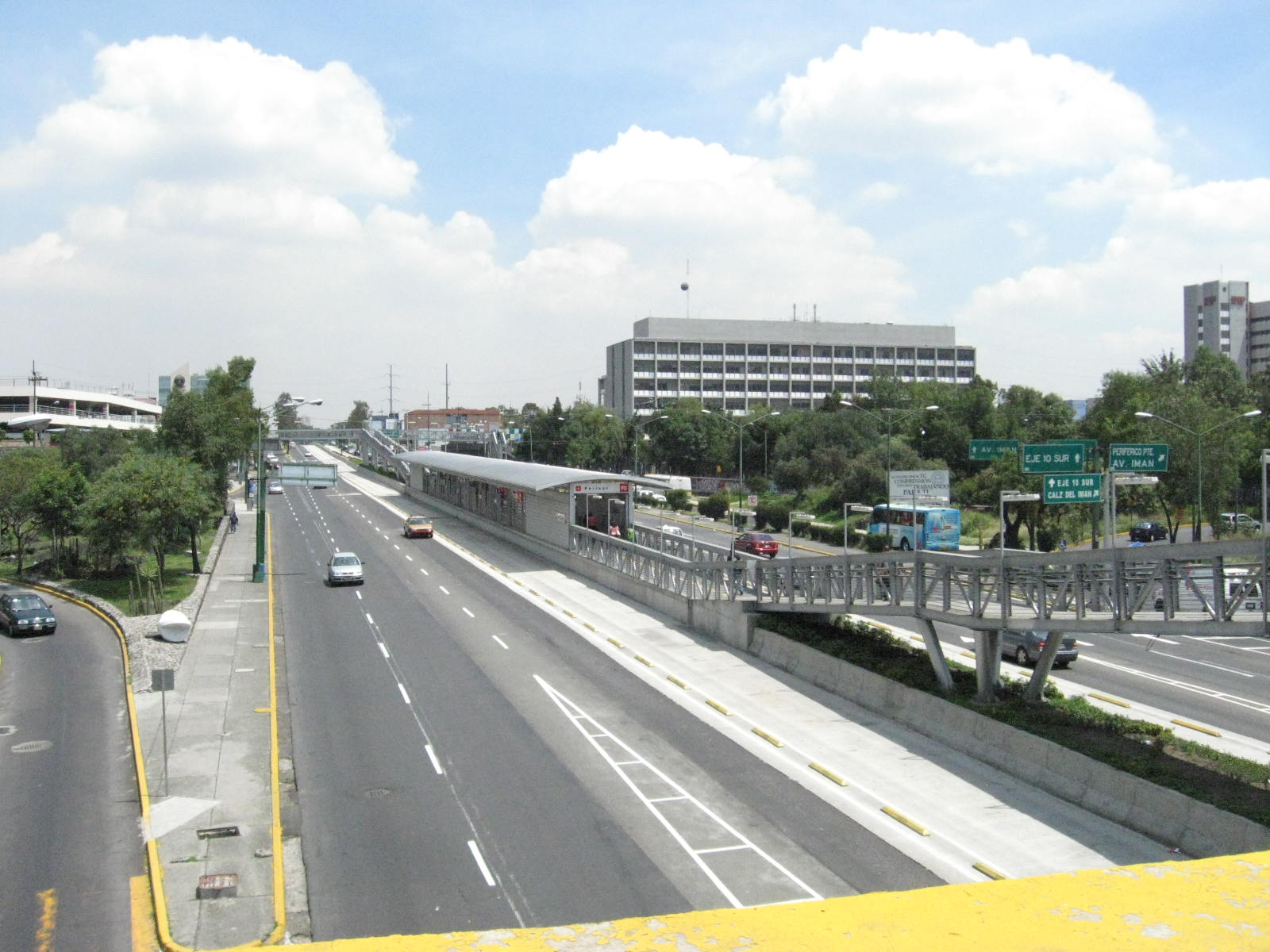
Southern section of Avenida de los Insurgentes seen from a bridge of the Periférico near the Perisur Mall, showing the Perisur MB station

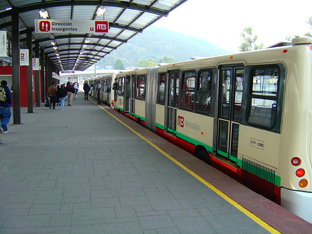
Indios Verdes Station when inaugurated.

The first metrobus service began along the northernmost portion of Line 1 on 19 June 2005. Initial service was from Metro Indios Verdes south to Metro Insurgentes. This was quickly followed by a southward expansion from Metro Insurgentes to MB station Doctor Gálvez, bringing the line length up to 20 kilometres (12 mi). Many of the stations along Line 1 feature cantilevered glass canopies designed by architect Carlos Monge.

The original Line 1 was expanded with the inclusion of nine new stations in order to achieve full coverage of Avenida Insurgentes. The southward expansion of service along Line 1 started service on 13 March 2008 and brought the line's length up to 30 kilometres (19 mi).

=== Line 2 ===

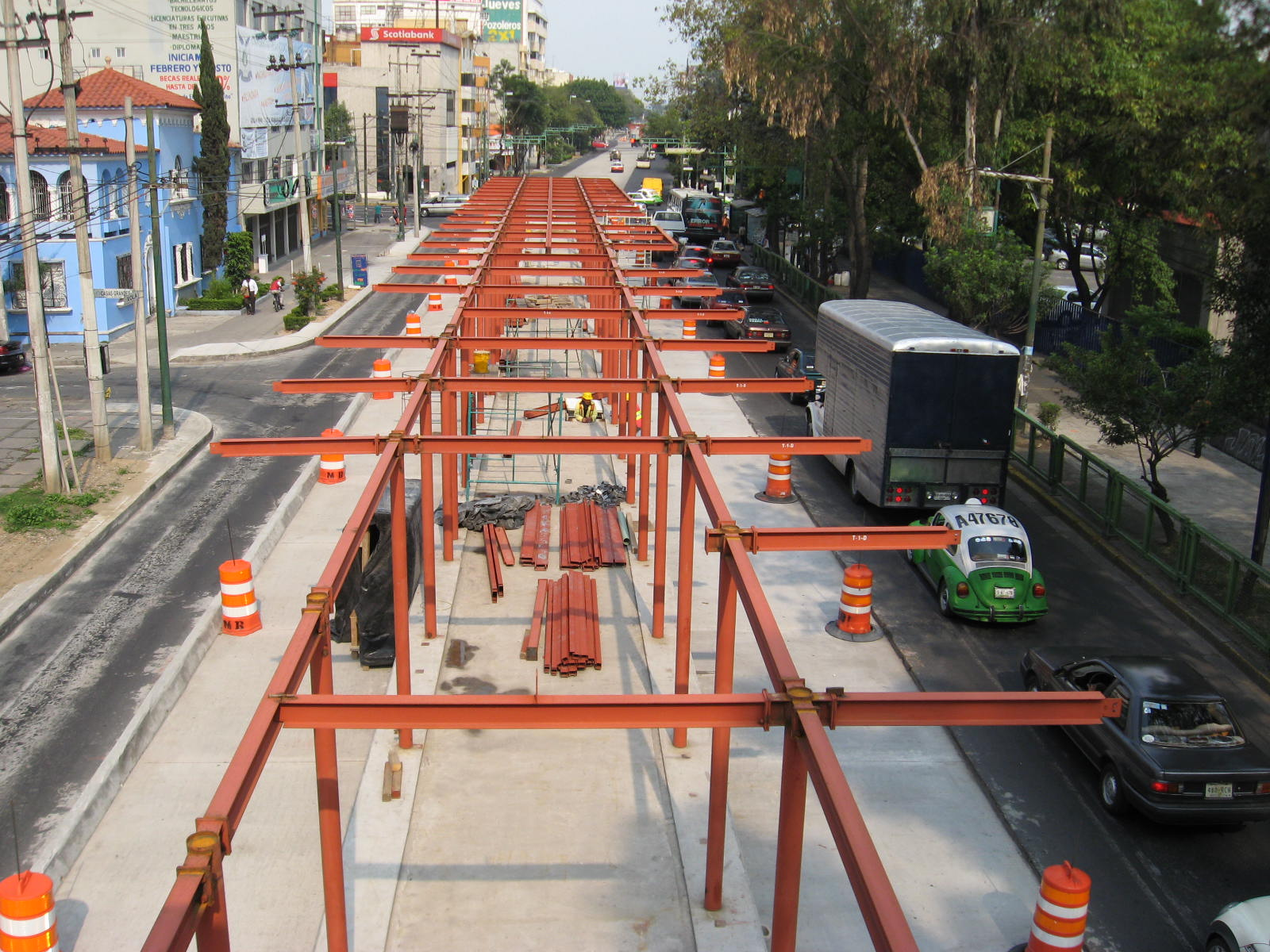
Xola station under construction near the intersection of Eje Central and Eje 4 Sur; 25 August 2008

Line 2 runs 20 kilometres (12 mi) along Eje 4 Sur from Tacubaya in the west, where there is a connection to the Metro Tacubaya station; via Etiopía, Patriotismo and crossing Line 1 (Insurgentes) at Nuevo León, to Tepalcates in the east, where there is a connection to the Metro Tepalcates station. The line opened on 16 December 2008.

=== Line 3 ===

Line 3 runs 20 kilometres (12 mi) from Tenayuca northwest of the city southward to Pueblo Santa Cruz Atoyac, where there is connection to Metro Zapata station.

According to the Mexican newspaper, El Universal, construction of the first 16 km (9.9 mi) of Línea 3 (line 3) began on 5 March 2010 and was scheduled to end in April 2011. However, service along Line 3 started on 8 February 2011. During construction, for every tree taken down three were planted, for a total of 1,546 trees planted. In addition, it was estimated that Line 3 will carry 100,000 passengers per day. Travel time will be reduced by up to 40%.

Line 3 opened on 8 February 2011.

=== Line 4 ===

Line 4 runs from Buenavista railway station in the west of the city eastward towards Mexico City International Airport. In late 2010 the Head of Government of the Federal District Marcelo Ebrard announced a plan to build the new line. Construction on Line 4 started on 4 July 2011, although the start of construction was met with some protest from residents and business owners along the proposed route.

Line 4 included a two-step construction process with the first 28-kilometre (17 mi) operational segment built between Buenavista and Metro San Lázaro. An extension provides travel between San Lázaro and the airport. Instead of travelling along a single avenue or axis road, Line 4 traffic circulates around the Centro Histórico. To navigate the turns and narrow streets in and near the Centro Histórico, Line 4 uses 12-metre-long (39 ft) light buses instead of the 18-metre (59 ft) articulated buses used on the other lines in the system. The stations for Line 4 look more like conventional bus stops and are built at curbside instead of within a dedicated portion of a central reservation as used on the other lines.

Line 4 opened on 1 April 2012.

=== Line 5 ===

On 5 November 2013, Line 5 opened, running along Eje 3 Oriente connecting San Lázaro east of downtown with Río de los Remedios avenue to the northeast. Since 7 September 2020, Line 5 was expanded to southeastern Mexico City, to Las Bombas avenue.

=== Line 6 ===

Line 6 is an east–west line connecting the northwest and northeast of the city, running along Eje 5 Norte from El Rosario to Villa de Aragón Line 6 opened on 21 January 2016.

=== Line 7 ===

Line 7 opened on 28 February 2018, with service along the city's iconic boulevard, Paseo de la Reforma, on part of the line from Monumento Cuitláhuac to La Diana. The complete line will run from Indios Verdes to Campo Marte (one station west of Auditorio), using a fleet of 90 Alexander Dennis Enviro500 double-decker buses with a capacity of 130 passengers each.

=== Hours ===
The MB operates from 04:30 to 24:00 (midnight) Monday through Saturday, and from 05:00 to 24:00 on Sundays and holidays. Hours for individual stations may vary in the mornings. A flash-based map of the system is available at the Metrobús website.

== See also ==
- Servicio de Transportes Eléctricos
- Metrobus (Lahore)
- Metrobus (Istanbul)
