= Villa de Aragón metro station =

Mexico City metro station

Villa de Aragón
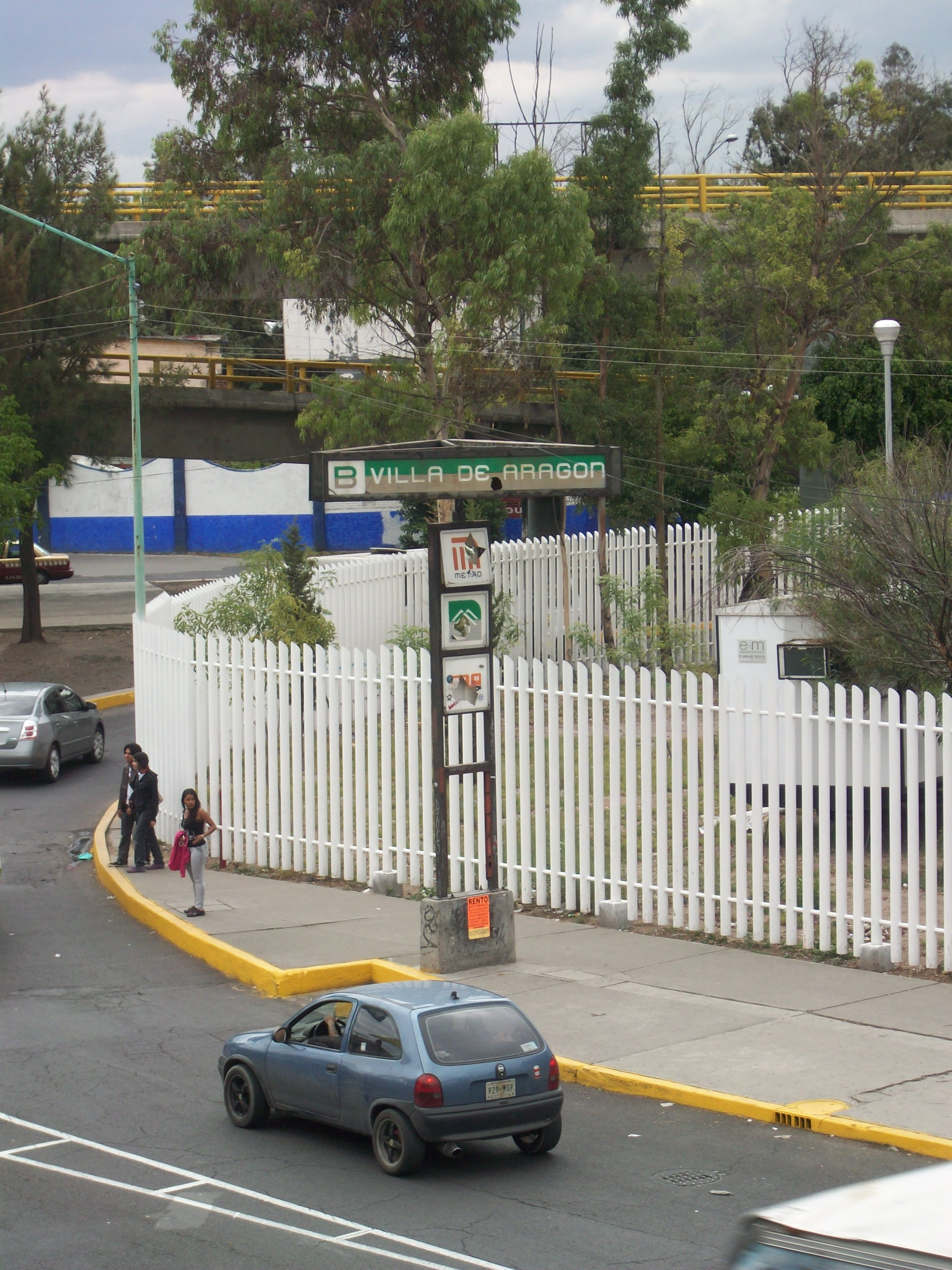

General information
- Location: Mexico City; Mexico
- Coordinates: 19°27′42″N 99°03′42″W
- System: Mexico City Metro
- Platforms: 1 island platform
- Tracks: 2
- Connections: Villa de Aragón

Construction
- Structure type: At grade

History
- Opened: 15 December 1999

Passengers
- 2025: 4,604,715 (Note: The data here is limited to the most recent ten years to avoid excessive listings; earlier figures can be found in this page's history or on the Mexico City Metro website. To calculate the average daily ridership, the annual total is divided by 365 days (366 in leap years), with decimals omitted from the result. Each station per line is ranked individually, as the system counts transfer stations separately. The percentage change is calculated automatically using the data from the current year and the previous year.) ▼1.87%
- Rank: 113/195

Services
Preceding station	Mexico City Metro	Following station
Nezahualcóyotl toward Ciudad Azteca	Line B	Bosque de Aragón toward Buenavista
Route map
Location
- Location within Mexico City
- Area map

Villa de Aragón is a station on Line B of the Mexico City Metro system. It is located in the Gustavo A. Madero municipality, in the limits with the State of Mexico. In 2019, the station had an average ridership of 14,456 passengers per day.

== General information ==
The station was opened on 15 December 1999 and was the temporary northern terminus of the line, until its expansion towards Ciudad Azteca in November 2000.

Villa de Aragón serves the Villa de Aragón and San Juan de Aragón neighborhoods in the Gustavo A. Madero municipality in the north of Mexico City.

=== Name and pictogram ===
The station is located in the Villa de Aragón neighborhood, hence the name. Villa de Aragón's pictogram depicts a collection of houses.

=== Ridership ===
Annual passenger ridership
Year	Ridership	Average daily	Rank	% change	Ref.
2025	4,604,715	12,615	113/195	−1.87%
2024	4,692,478	12,870	104/195	−6.34%
2023	5,009,932	13,725	92/195	+12.77%
2022	4,442,634	12,171	95/195	+71.51%
2021	2,590,343	7,096	121/195	+126.73%
2020	1,142,478	6,215	185/195	−78.84%
2019	5,398,782	14,791	122/195	+1.58%
2018	5,314,564	14,560	122/195	+5.76%
2017	5,025,145	13,767	124/195	−2.38%
2016	5,147,843	14,065	123/195	+1.24%
