= Ciudad Azteca metro station =

Mexico City Metro station

Ciudad Azteca
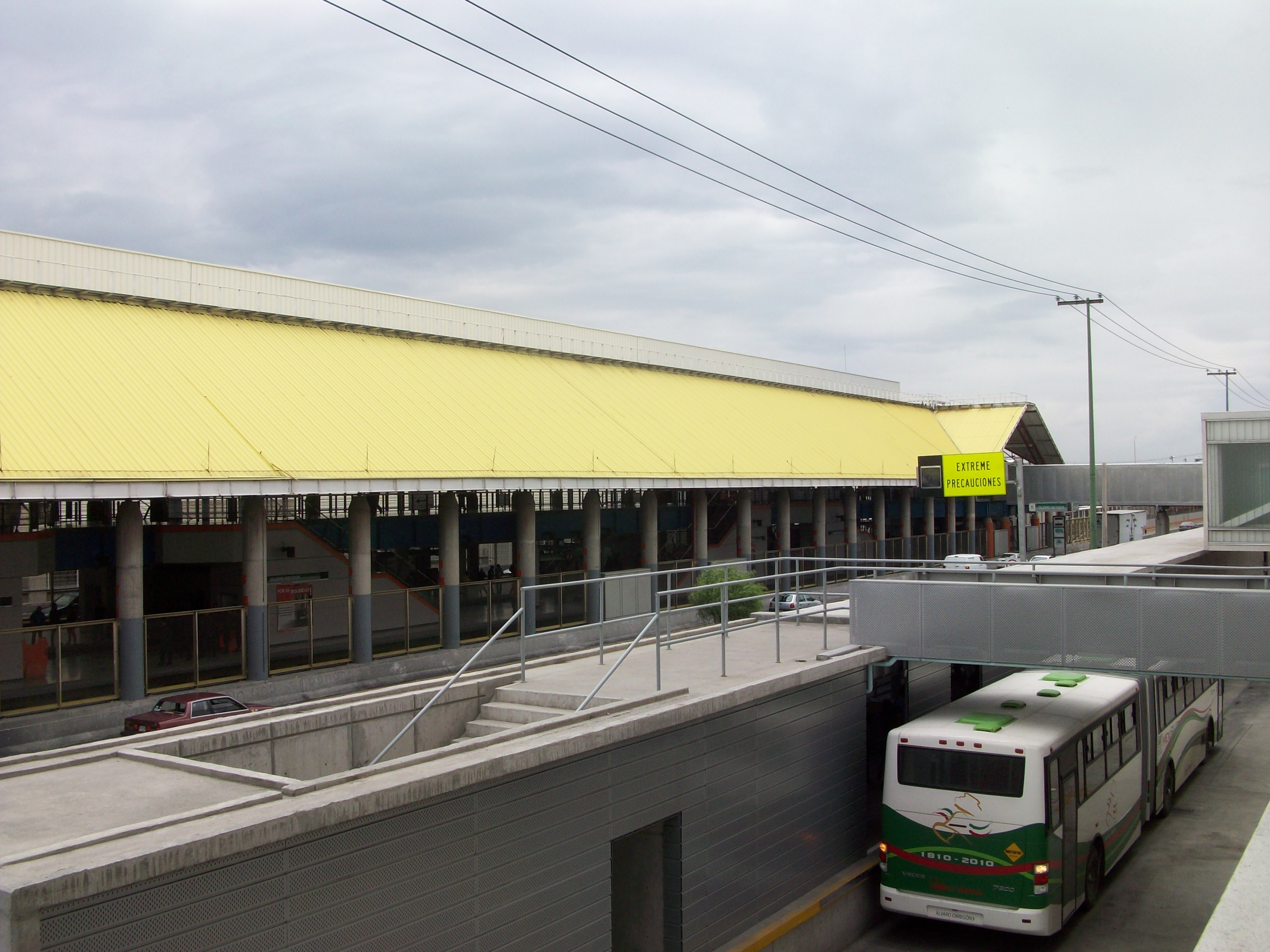
- The station in 2012 as seen from the adjacent Mexipuerto shopping mall. A Mexibús bus is seen providing service at the bus station.

General information
- Location: Carlos Hank González Avenue; Ecatepec de Morelos, State of Mexico; Mexico
- Coordinates: 19°32′05″N 99°01′39″W
- System: Mexico City Metro
- Owner: Government of Mexico City
- Operator: Sistema de Transporte Colectivo (STC)
- Platforms: 2 island platforms
- Tracks: 3
- Connections: Ciudad Azteca; Ciudad Azteca

Construction
- Structure type: At grade
- Accessible: Yes

Other information
- Status: In service

History
- Opened: 30 November 2000

Passengers
- 2025: 14,832,384 (Note: The system's website counts only passenger entries into stations and does not include passengers passing through, transferring between lines, or exiting the station. The data here is limited to the most recent ten years to avoid excessive listings; earlier figures can be found in this page's history or on the Mexico City Metro website. To calculate the average daily ridership, the annual total is divided by 365 days (366 in leap years), with decimals omitted from the result. Each station per line is ranked individually, as the system counts transfer stations separately. The percentage change is calculated automatically using the data from the current year and the previous year.) ▼2.45%
- Rank: 11/195

Services
Preceding station	Mexico City Metro	Following station
Terminus	Line B	Plaza Aragón toward Buenavista
Route map
Location
- Location within Mexico City urban area
- Area map

Ciudad Azteca metro station (Note: Estación del Metro Ciudad Azteca. Mexican Spanish pronunciation: [sjuˈðað asˈteka]. The name of the station literally means "Aztec City" in Spanish.) is a station of the Mexico City Metro in the metropolitan area of Mexico City. Found along Avenida Carlos Hank González, in Ecatepec de Morelos, State of Mexico, it is an at-grade station with two island platforms serving as the northeastern terminus of Line B (Green-and-Gray Line), followed by Plaza Aragón metro station. Ciudad Azteca metro station was inaugurated on 30 November 2000, providing service southwest toward Buenavista metro station.

The area surrounding Ciudad Azteca metro station is a key point in Ecatepec, as it is adjacent to the Terminal Multimodal Azteca Bicentenario (also known as Mexipuerto Ciudad Azteca), a shopping mall and transportation hub that connects with local bus routes. It is also the terminus of Mexibús Line 1, a bus rapid transit line that connects Mexico City to the Felipe Ángeles International Airport (AIFA). The station is also adjacent to the Multiplaza Aragón shopping center, one of the busiest in the country.

The metro station services the Colonia (neighborhood) of Ciudad Azteca [es], from which it gets its name. The station's pictogram depicts the silhouette of the neighborhood Aztec glyph. In 2025, it recorded an average daily ridership of 40,636 passenger entries, making it the system's eleventh-busiest station. The station facilities offer accessibility for people with disabilities, including elevators, tactile paving, and braille signage plates.

== Location and layout ==
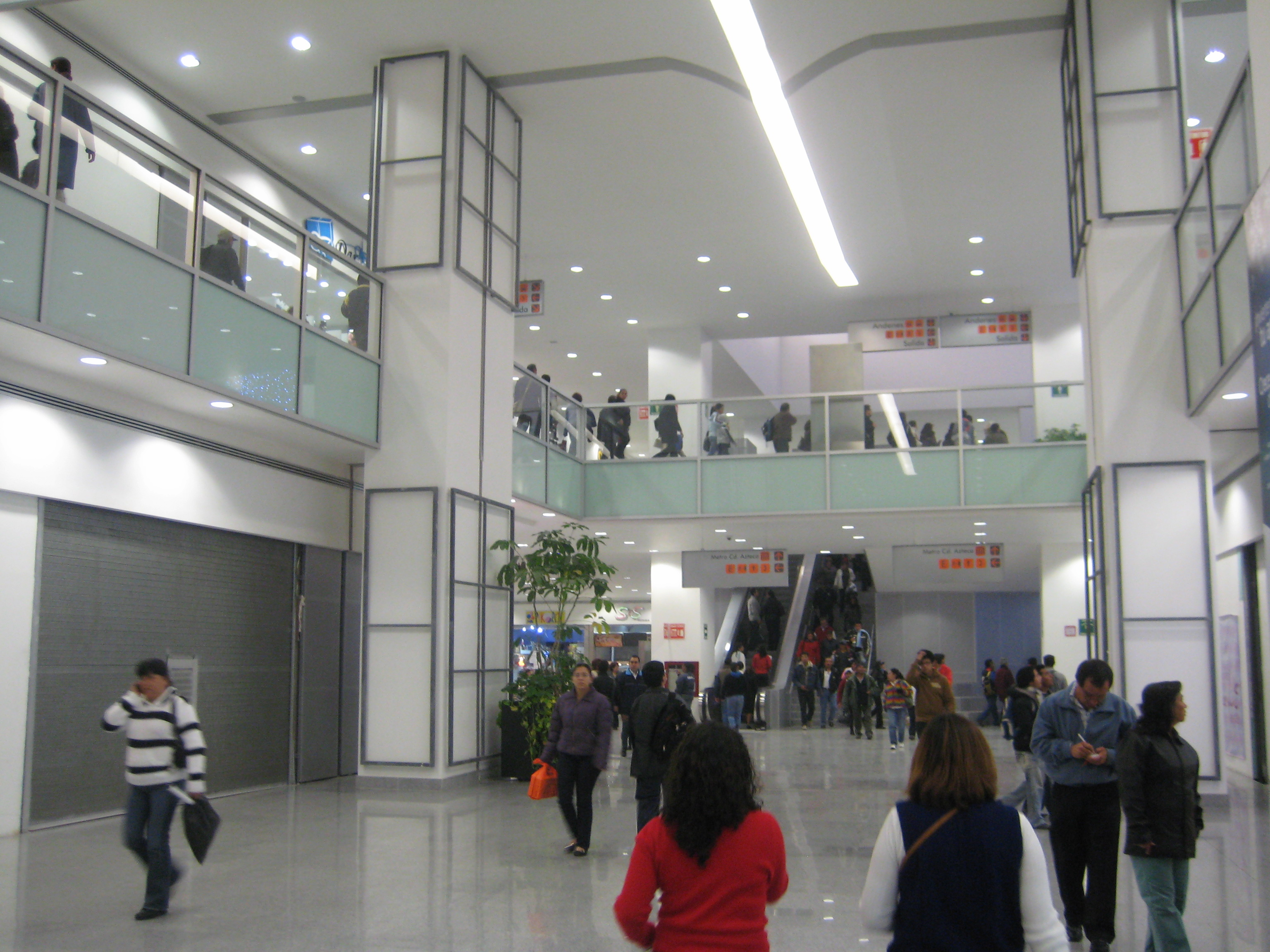
Mexipuerto Ciudad Azteca in 2009

Ciudad Azteca is an at-grade metro station found outside Mexico City. It serves Line B along the median strip of Avenida Carlos Hank González (otherwise known as Avenida Central), in the Colonia ("neighborhood") of Ciudad Azteca, in the municipality of Ecatepec de Morelos, State of Mexico.

Ciudad Azteca metro station is a key point that connects Mexico City with the northern and eastern municipalities of the neighboring State of Mexico. It is found on the northern end of Multiplaza Aragón, one of the busiest shopping malls in the country. Also, the station connects to the Terminal Multimodal Azteca Bicentenario (also known as Mexipuerto Ciudad Azteca), a shopping mall and transportation hub, locally known as Estación de transferencia modal (ETRAM). The hub provides access to various routes and modes of transportation, like peseros (local share minibuses) or Mexibús Line 1, a bus rapid transit line that connects Mexico City to the Felipe Ángeles International Airport (AIFA), in Zumpango.

Ciudad Azteca metro station has four exits, all serving Avenida Carlos Hank González and Boulevard de los Guerreros. (Note: The website incorrectly names the boulevard as "Boulevard de los Remedios", which might refer to the avenue near Río de los Remedios metro station.) The station offers an accessible service with elevators, tactile paving and braille signage plates. Within the system, Plaza Aragón is the next station. The line's railyard and workshops are located in the opposite direction from Ciudad Azteca metro station.

== History and construction ==
The line's railyard (pictured) is found after the station

Line B of the Mexico City Metro was built by Empresas ICA. The section including Ciudad Azteca metro station formed part of a northward extension from Villa de Aragón, and opened on 30 November 2000, becoming the line's northern terminal station, with trains operations southward toward Buenavista station. The section between Ciudad Azteca and Plaza Aragón station is 574 meters (1,883 ft) long.

The ETRAM opened in 2009, and, as of 2015, had no crime reports and had 30 transportation routes operating with an average ridership of 180,000 daily users. By 2023, there were reports of neglected maintenance because coordination between the government of Mexico City and the State of Mexico is required. Besides, there were constant delays reported in the Mexibús service; and assailants board the minibuses without being detected.

=== Name and pictogram ===
The station's pictogram features the silhouette of a glyph representing Ciudad Azteca, depicting an Aztec building.

== Ridership ==
Daily ridership for Ciudad Azteca station in 2024

According to official data, before the impact of the COVID-19 pandemic, the station recorded between 58,400 and 61,700 average daily entries from 2016 to 2019. In 2025, it recorded 14,832,384 annual passenger entries, ranking eleventh among the system's 195 stations.

Annual passenger ridership
Year	Ridership	Average daily	Rank	% change	Ref.
2025	14,832,384	40,636	11/195	−2.45%	
2024	15,205,029	41,543	10/195	+12.61%	
2023	13,502,086	36,992	12/195	−4.69%	
2022	14,166,172	38,811	11/195	+29.34%	
2021	10,952,831	30,007	12/195	−10.98%	
2020	12,303,341	33,615	11/195	−42.54%	
2019	21,410,326	58,658	12/195	+0.31%	
2018	21,343,822	58,476	12/195	+2.31%	
2017	20,861,402	57,154	12/195	−7.59%	
2016	22,574,939	61,680	11/195	−2.98%	
