= Buenavista metro station =

Mexico City Metro station

Buenavista
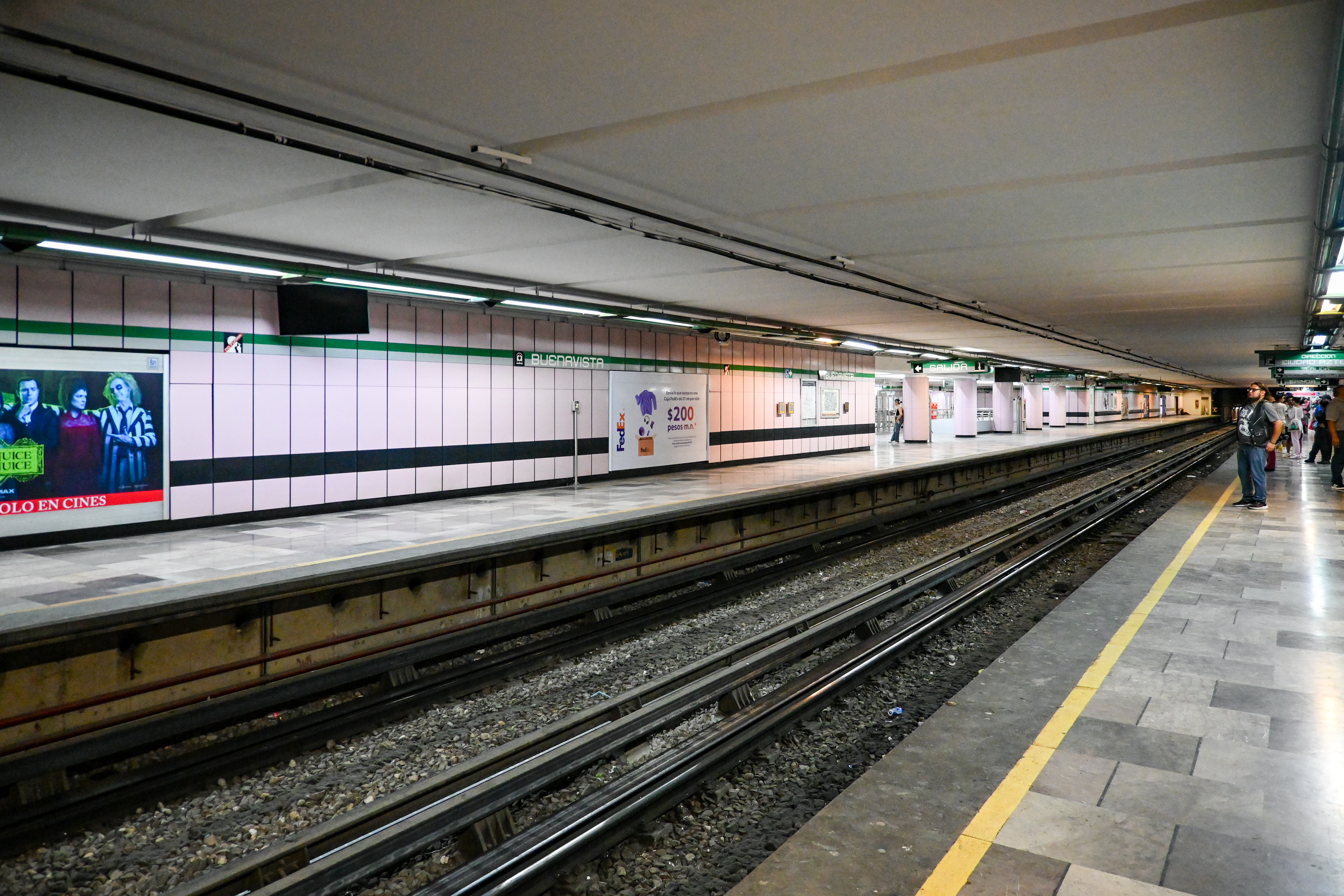
- Platforms in 2024

General information
- Location: Avenida Mosqueta and Avenida de los Insurgentes; Cuauhtémoc, Mexico City; Mexico
- Coordinates: 19°26′48″N 99°09′12″W
- System: Mexico City Metro
- Owner: Government of Mexico City
- Platforms: 2
- Tracks: 2
- Connections: Buenavista; Buenavista; Buenavista; Buenavista; Buenavista; (at distance); Routes: 10E, 11C, 12B

Construction
- Structure type: Underground
- Parking: Yes (at Forum Buenavista)
- Cycle facilities: Bicycle parking-only
- Accessible: Yes

History
- Opened: 15 December 1999; 26 years ago

Passengers
- 2025: 15,617,729 (Note: The system's website counts only passenger entries into stations and does not include passengers passing through, transferring between lines, or exiting the station. The data here is limited to the most recent ten years to avoid excessive listings; earlier figures can be found in this page's history or on the Mexico City Metro website. To calculate the average daily ridership, the annual total is divided by 365 days (366 in leap years), with decimals omitted from the result. Each station per line is ranked individually, as the system counts transfer stations separately. The percentage change is calculated automatically using the data from the current year and the previous year.) ▼13.89%
- Rank: 10/195

Services
| Preceding station | Mexico City Metro | Following station |
|---|---|---|
| Guerrero toward Ciudad Azteca | Line B | Terminus |
Route map
Location
- Area map

Buenavista metro station (Note: Estación del Metro Buenavista. Spanish pronunciation: [bwenaˈbista]. The name of the station literally means "Good View" in Spanish.) is a station of the Mexico City Metro in the city's borough of Cuauhtémoc. Found in the intersection of Avenida Mosqueta and Avenida de los Insurgentes, it is an underground station with two side platforms serving as the western terminus of Line B (Green-and-Gray Line), followed by Guerrero metro station. Buenavista metro station was inaugurated on 15 December 1999, providing service northeast toward Villa de Aragón metro station.

The area surrounding Buenavista metro station is a key point in central Mexico City, as it is adjacent to the Buenavista railway station, which serves the Tren Suburbano and Felipe Ángeles train, connecting the city with the neighboring State of Mexico. Additionally, there is a transportation hub serving multiple local bus routes, including the Metrobús service. Buenavista metro station is consistently among the busiest stations in the Mexico City Metro. In 2025, it recorded an average daily ridership of 42,788 passenger entries, making it the system's tenth-busiest station. The station facilities offer accessibility for people with disabilities, including elevators, tactile paving, and braille signage plates.

The metro station services the Colonia (neighborhood) of Buenavista, from which it gets its name. The station's pictogram depicts the silhouette of a locomotive, referring to the historical train station operated by Ferrocarriles Nacionales de México, which formerly provided service to destinations across Mexico.

== Location and station layout ==
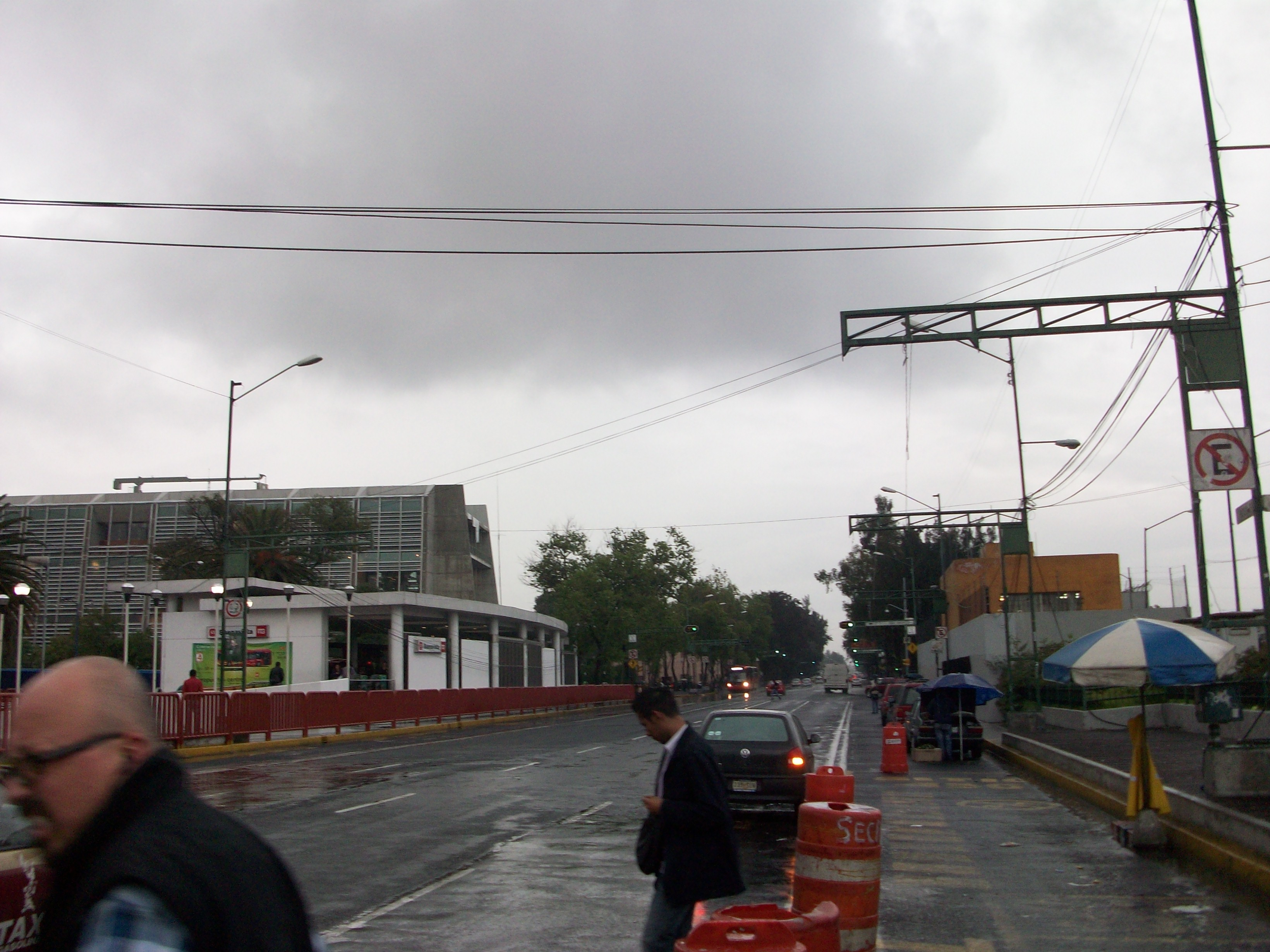
The station is situated below Avenida Mosqueta (pictured)

Buenavista is an underground metro station on Line B below Avenida Mosqueta and Avenida de los Insurgentes in the Colonia ("neighborhood") of Buenavista, in the borough of Cuauhtémoc, central Mexico City. The station offers a disabled-accessible service with elevators, tactile paving, and braille signage plates. Within the system, Guerrero is the next station.

The metro station is serviced by a Centro de transferencia modal (CETRAM), a transportation hub, since 2016. The hub provides access to various routes and modes of transportation. The station has five exits. The northeast, northwest and southwest exits provide access to Avenida Mosqueta and Avenida de los Insurgentes, while the southeast exit leads to Avenida Mosqueta and Calle Jesús García. A fifth exit leads to the adjacent Buenavista railway station, which serves the Tren Suburbano and Felipe Ángeles train, connecting the city with the neighboring State of Mexico.

Available transportation options include Lines 1, 3, and 4 of the Metrobús bus rapid transit (BRT) system, split into four independent platforms. Routes 10E, 11C, and 12B of the city's public bus system provide service to the area. An Ecobici bicycle-sharing station is located nearby; as of 2025, it was the most used station in the system. The Government of Mexico City installed a bicycle parking station outside the station in 2019, with space for 128 bicycles.

Above the railway station is located Forum Buenavista, a shopping mall, and next to the building is the Vasconcelos Library. Near both stations is found the Tianguis Cultural del Chopo, the Museo Universitario del Chopo, the Morisco Kiosk, and Colonia Santa María la Ribera.

== History and construction ==
Line B of the Mexico City Metro was built by Empresas ICA. Its first section, where Buenavista metro station is located, was inaugurated on 15 December 1999, running to Villa de Aragón metro station.

The tunnel between Buenavista and Guerrero spans 521 meters (1,709 ft). There have been proposals in master plans to extend the line westward 2 kilometers (1.2 mi) from Buenavista to Colegio Militar, but they have not been formalized.

=== Name and pictogram ===
The station logo represents the front of a locomotive. The station is named after the neighborhood, which got its name because it offered a good view centuries ago. Inside the neighborhood there was a train station operated by Ferrocarriles Nacionales de México, which formerly provided service to destinations across Mexico.

== Ridership ==
Daily ridership for Buenavista station in 2024

According to official data, before the impact of the COVID-19 pandemic, the station recorded between 58,500 and 60,400 average daily entries from 2016 to 2019. In 2025, it recorded 15,617,729 annual passenger entries, ranking tenth among the system's 195 stations.

Annual passenger ridership
| Year | Ridership | Average daily | Rank | % change | Ref. |
|---|---|---|---|---|---|
| 2025 | 15,617,729 | 42,788 | 10/195 | −13.89% | |
| 2024 | 18,137,887 | 49,557 | 8/195 | +2.80% | |
| 2023 | 17,643,068 | 48,337 | 7/195 | +8.85% | |
| 2022 | 16,208,913 | 44,407 | 9/195 | +33.80% | |
| 2021 | 12,114,410 | 33,190 | 9/195 | +4.16% | |
| 2020 | 11,631,128 | 31,779 | 13/195 | −46.91% | |
| 2019 | 21,907,761 | 60,021 | 11/195 | −0.52% | |
| 2018 | 22,023,270 | 60,337 | 11/195 | +1.75% | |
| 2017 | 21,644,709 | 59,300 | 11/195 | +1.03% | |
| 2016 | 21,423,610 | 58,534 | 13/195 | −0.39% | |
