= Tezozomoc =

Tezozomoc (also Tezozómoc, Tezozomoctli, Tezozomoctzin) was a Nahuatl male name. It may refer to:

== People ==
- Tezozomoc (Azcapotzalco) (died 1426), ruler of Azcapotzalco
- Tezozomoc (son of Itzcoatl), father of three Aztec rulers
- Tezozomoctli (Cuauhtitlan) (died 1430), ruler of Quauhtitlan
- Tezozomoctli (Cuitlahuac Tizic) (1406–1483), ruler of Cuitlahuac Tizic
- Tezozomoctli Acolnahuacatl, brother of Moctezuma II
- Tezozomoc (son of Chimalpopoca), king of Ecatepec
- Fernando Alvarado Tezozómoc, post-conquest Aztec chronicler

== Other uses ==
- Tezozómoc metro station, Mexico City
- Parque Tezozómoc, Mexico City
