= Fernando Alvarado Tezozómoc =

Nahua noble in Colonial Mexico

Hernando (de) Alvarado Tezozómoc was a colonial Nahua noble. He was a son of Diego de Alvarado Huanitzin (governor of Tenochtitlan) and Francisca de Moctezuma (a daughter of Moctezuma II). Tezozómoc worked as an interpreter for the Real Audiencia. He was also a very important chronicler, pertaining to a group of mestizo chroniclers with Fernando de Alva Cortés Ixtlilxóchitl, Diego Muñoz Camargo and Chimalpahin. Today he is known for the Crónica Mexicayotl, a Nahuatl history.

== Ancestry ==
Huehue Tezozomoctli | Chimalpilli I Ruler of Ecatepec
Axayacatl; Ruler of Tenochtitlan | Matlaccoatzin; Ruler of Ecatepec
Tezozomoctli Acolnahuacatl | Tlacuilolxochtzin | Moctezuma II; Ruler of Tenochtitlan | Tlapalizquixochtzin; Ruler of Ecatepec
Don Diego de Alvarado Huanitzin; Ruler of Ecatepec and Tenochtitlan | Doña Francisca de Moctezuma
Don Hernando de Alvarado; Tezozomoc

== Bibliography ==
- León-Portilla, Miguel (1992). The Broken Spears: The Aztec Account of the Conquest of Mexico (Expanded and updated ed.). Boston, MA: Beacon Press. ISBN 9780807055014. OCLC 24542950.
- Romero Galván, José Rubén (2003). Los privilegios perdidos: Hernando Alvarado Tezozómoc, su tiempo, su nobleza, y su Crónica mexicana (in Spanish). Mexico City: UNAM. ISBN 970-32-0690-5. OCLC 54477363.
- Schroeder, Susan (27 July 2011). "The Truth about the Crónica Mexicayotl". Colonial Latin American Review. 20 (2): 233–247. doi:10.1080/10609164.2011.587268. ISSN 1060-9164. S2CID 162390334.
