= Chimalpilli =

Chimalpilli may refer to:

- Chimalpilli I, the first king of Ecatepec
- Chimalpilli II
