= Matlaccoatzin =

- Tlatoani of Ecatepec
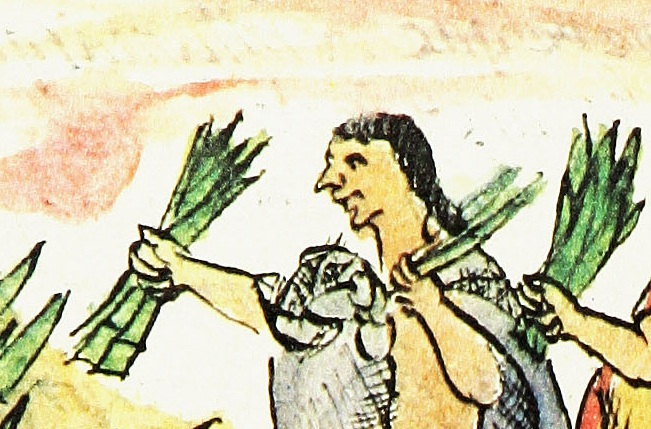
- An image of an Aztec king
- Predecessor: Chimalpilli I
- Successor: Chimalpilli II
- Born: c. 1427; Mexico
- Died: 1465
- Spouse(s): Tezozomoctli Acolnahuacatl
- Issue: Chimalpilli II; Tlacuilolxochtzin; Tlapalizquixochtzin
- Father: Matlaccoatzin

Matlaccoatzin was an Ecatepec Tlatoani, father of Chimalpilli II, Tlacuilolxochtzin and Tlapalizquixochtzin.

Regnal titles
Preceded by Chimalpilli I	Tlatoani of Ecatepec	Succeeded by Chimalpilli II
