= Tecnológico =

Tecnológico may refer to:

- Tecnológico railway station, in Metepec, State of Mexico
- Estadio Tecnológico, a former stadium in Monterrey
- Estadio Tecnológico de Oaxaca, a stadium in Oaxaca City
- Ecatepec metro station, in Mexico City, originally named "Tecnológico"
