= Chimalpilli I =

Tlatoani of Ecatepec
- Reign: 1428–1465
- Successor: Tezozomoc
- Died: 1465
- Issue: Matlaccoatzin
- Father: Huehue Huanitzin
- Mother: Chichimecacihuatzin II

Chimalpilli I was a tlatoani (ruler) of the Aztec altepetl (city-state) of Ecatepec from 1428 until his death in 1465. He was the first known historical king of that city.

He was also known as Huehue Chimalpilli.

There was also Chimalpilli II.

== Biography ==
Chimalpilli was a son of Chichimecacihuatzin II. Her father was an Aztec emperor Moctezuma I and her mother was queen Chichimecacihuatzin I.

His father was Huehue Huanitzin, a "great leader" of Itztapalapan.

His successor was Tezozomoc, son of Emperor Chimalpopoca.

== Family tree ==
Chimalpilli had a son called Matlaccoatzin, and he is sometimes called a king.

Huehue Tezozomoctli	Chimalpilli I Ruler of Ecatepec
Axayacatl; Ruler of Tenochtitlan	Matlaccoatzin; Prince of Ecatepec
Tezozomoctli Acolnahuacatl	Tlacuilolxochtzin	Moctezuma II; Ruler of Tenochtitlan	Tlapalizquixochtzin; Queen of Ecatepec
Don Diego de Alvarado Huanitzin; Ruler of Ecatepec and Tenochtitlan	Doña Francisca de Moctezuma
Hernando de Alvarado Tezozomoc

Preceded by —	Tlatoani of Ecatepec; 1428–1465	Succeeded by Tezozomoc
