= Chichimecacihuatzin II =

- Princess of Tenochtitlan
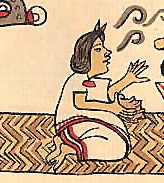
- Spouse: Huehue Huanitzin
- Issue: King Chimalpilli I
- Father: Moctezuma I
- Mother: Chichimecacihuatzin I

Chichimecacihuatzin II ('Little/Revered Chichimec Woman', Nahuatl pronunciation) was an Aztec princess of Tenochtitlan in Mexico.

== Etymology ==
The Nahuatl name Chīchīmēcah (plural, pronounced [tʃiːtʃiːˈmeːkaʔ]; singular Chīchīmēcatl) means "inhabitants of Chichiman"; the placename Chichiman itself means "Area of Milk". The word could either have a negative "barbarous" sense, or a positive "noble savage" sense.

== Biography ==
Chichimecacihuatzin was a daughter of Emperor Moctezuma I and his cousin-wife, Queen Chichimecacihuatzin I, after whom she was named.

She was a granddaughter of the king Cuauhtototzin and emperor Huitzilihuitl.

Her sister was Atotoztli II and her nephews were kings Axayacatl, Tizoc and Ahuitzotl. They all ruled over Tenochtitlan as great emperors.

Her husband was Huehue Huanitzin, a "great leader" of Itztapalapan and her son was Chimalpilli I (died in 1465). He was the first king of Ecatepec.
