= Puente de Fierro =

Bridge and former museum in Mexico

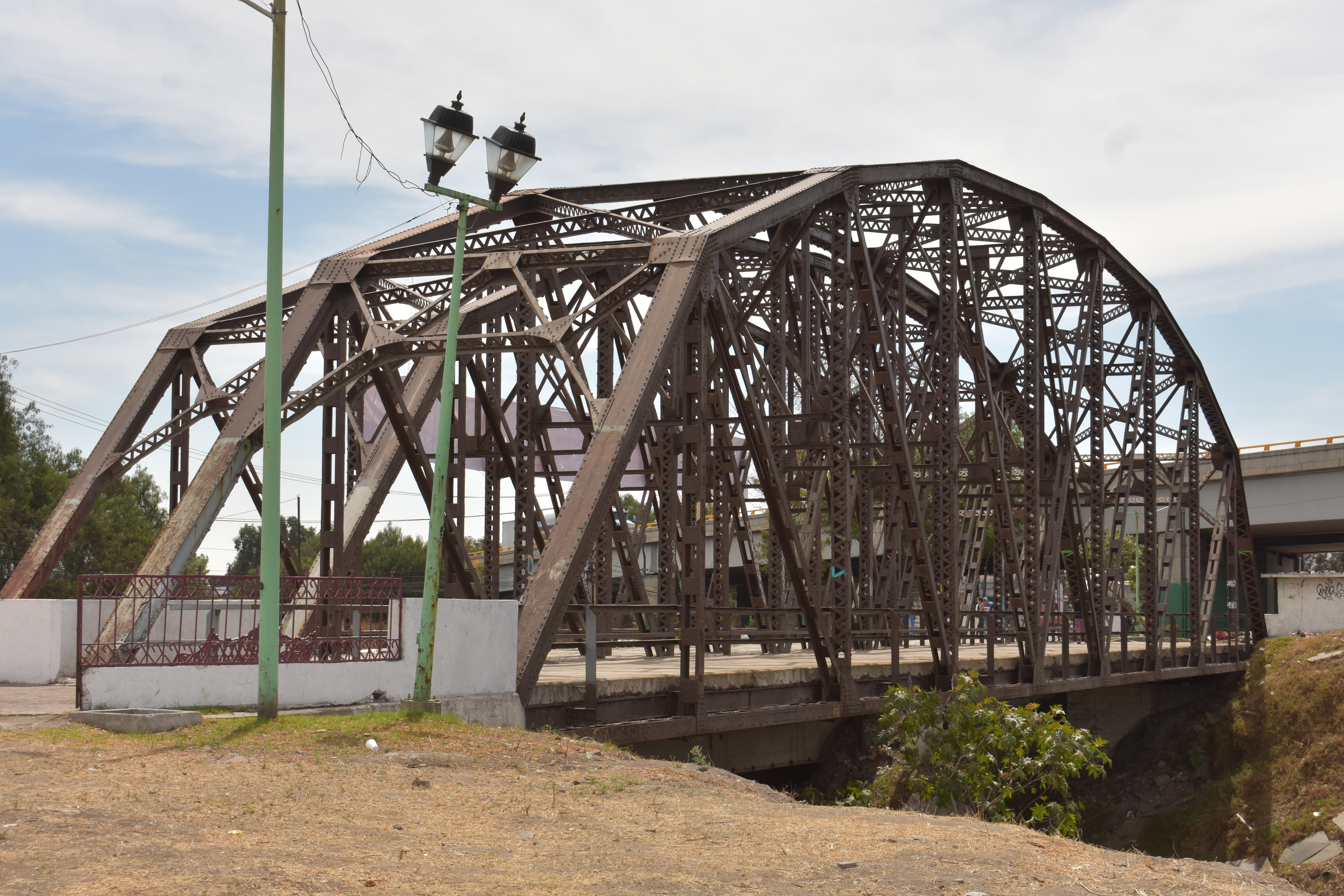
- The bridge in 2020
- Coordinates: 19°36′06″N 99°02′05″W
- Crosses: Sewage canal
- Locale: Ecatepec de Morelos
- Official name: Puente Ingeniero Ernesto Uriegas

Characteristics
- Design: Bowstring truss
- Material: Iron
- Total length: 33 m (108 ft)
- Width: 6 m (20 ft)
- Height: 15 m (49 ft)

Location
- Location

The Puente Ingeniero Ernesto Uriegas, best known as the Puente de Fierro (English: Iron Bridge), is a twin-span bridge found along Vía Morelos Avenue, in San Cristóbal, Ecatepec de Morelos, State of Mexico. The bridge was built to cross the Gran Canal del Desagüe (Grand Sewage Canal) that surrounds Mexico City. The origins of the construction of the bridge tend to differ depending on the source as there are few records of the bridge beyond undated pictures. One of the stories says that it was completed in 1896 to be operated by the National Railroad Company. There is also a persistent legend about its origins that mentions that Gustave Eiffel, at the request of president Porfirio Díaz, designed the bridge in the 1870s. It was later adapted into a provisional vehicle bridge and eventually replaced with an adjacent larger vehicular bridge. In 2000, the local government remodeled the space into a museum, which would last 16 years. Since then, the bridge has been abandoned and has received partial maintenance.

== History and construction ==
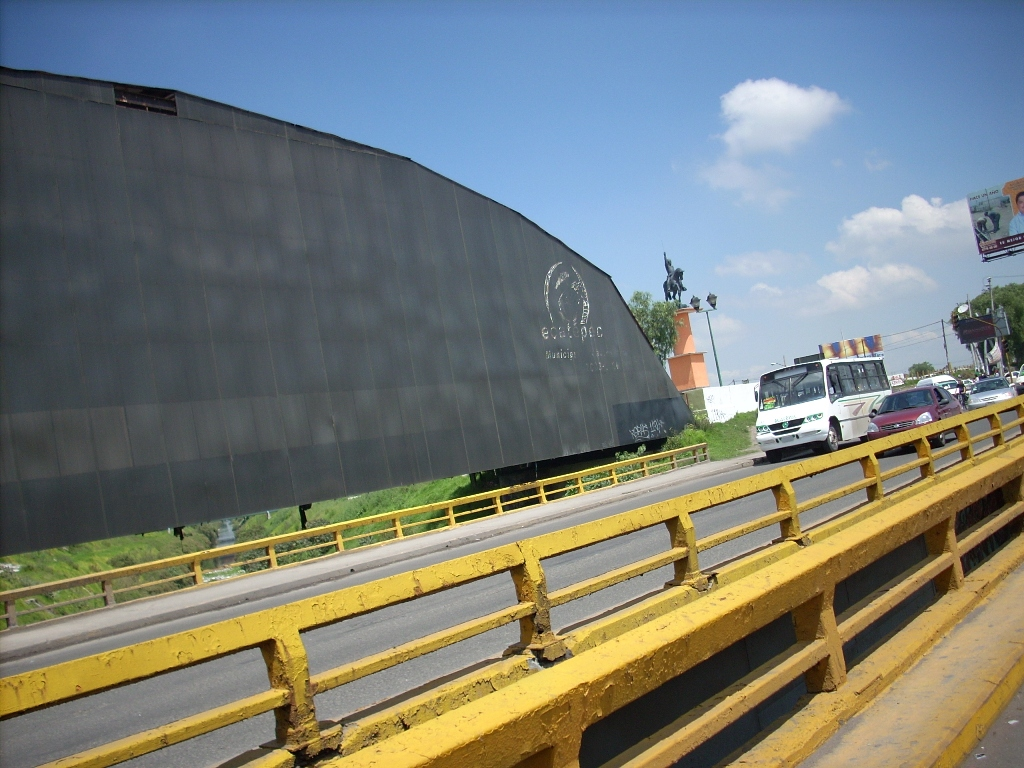
The bridge in 2007, along Vía Morelos

The origins of the bridge vary as there are few records of the bridge, coupled with the lack of an official name and the existence of several different iron bridges in the area. The bridge was built to cross the Gran Canal del Desagüe (Grand Sewage Canal) that surrounds Mexico City, which was created to reduce flooding in the city.

According to municipal historian Angélica Rivero López, the bridge was completed in July 1896 to be operated by the National Railroad Company (later Ferrocarriles Nacionales de México). Its materials were cast in the United Kingdom and gained the nickname of "English Bridge of San Cristóbal". In September 1940, the bridge was rebuilt and transformed into the current bridge. The works lasted for a year and it was reopened as the Ingeniero Ernesto Uriegas Bridge. In 1960, construction on a larger "México-Pachuca" Highway started, and the bridge was replaced with a larger span on the new highway.

According to architect Javier Martínez Burgos, who, together with the National Institute of Anthropology and History, carried out studies for its restoration, the bridge was not designed as a railroad bridge but for motor vehicles. The team found that the iron bars were cast by Aceros Monterrey, a company founded in 1900 that started casting in 1903.

There is a legend that says that the bridge was designed by Gustave Eiffel at the request of president Porfirio Díaz. According to the rumor, it was designed, built, and completed during the 1870s. The rumor then merges its aforementioned history. Even though there is no evidence that supports the story, the bridge is commonly labeled as a cousin of the Eiffel Tower. According to Martínez Burgos, the rumor was started in the 1980s by Manuel Bueno Herrera, a local artist. Martínez Burgos says that Bueno Herrera supported his version after he compared the bridge with the materials of the Eiffel Tower as well as with other works by Eiffel. According to Bueno Herrera, he did not start the rumor but echoed what a historian had said around 2001. He also mentioned that although he pointed out the similarities between the bridge and the Eiffel Tower, he never asserted that both works were designed by Eiffel.

=== Centro Cultural Puente del Arte ===
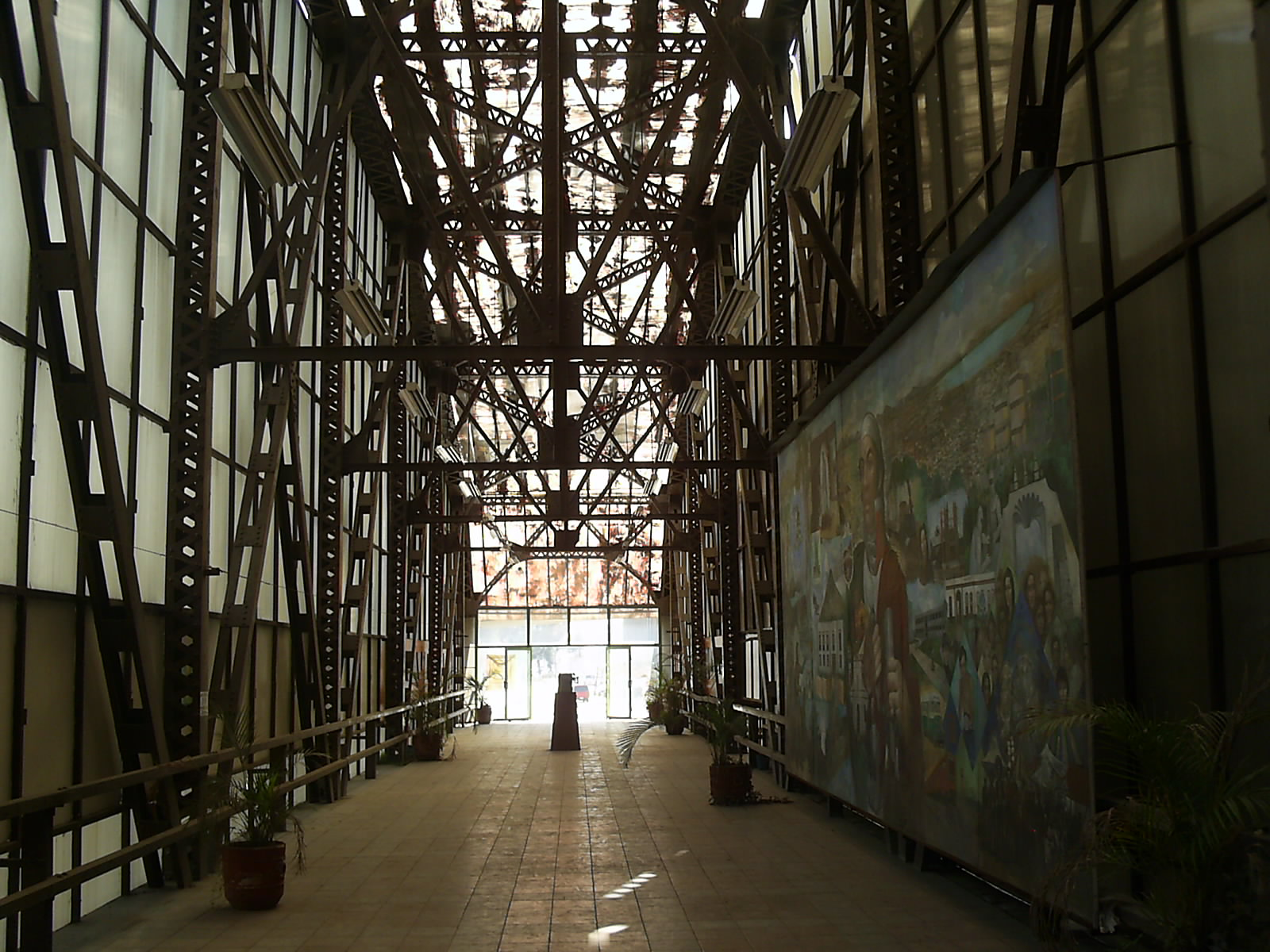
A mural inside the museum in 2005

After staying abandoned for 30 to 40 years, the government of Ecatepec decided to transform the bridge into a museum. Bueno Herrera was authorized to coordinate the restructuring and renovation works. The museum was opened on 17 August 2000 as the Centro Cultural Puente del Arte (Art Bridge Cultural Center) and exhibited contemporary artworks and held cultural workshops. As time passed, the museum declined; due to crime in the area, vandalism, and the lack of maintenance of the bridge, it was closed in 2016. When it was adapted into a museum, the structure was fitted with a frame of metal tubes to support polycarbonate sheets and tiles were added to the floor.

=== After the cultural center ===
In 2021, the bridge received maintenance. The elements added for the operation of the museum were removed and a surveillance module was installed to reduce crime in the area. The project cost 2.5 million pesos.

The area is serviced by the state's Mexibús bus rapid transit system at Puente de Fierro station, servicing Lines II and IV.

== Technical aspects ==
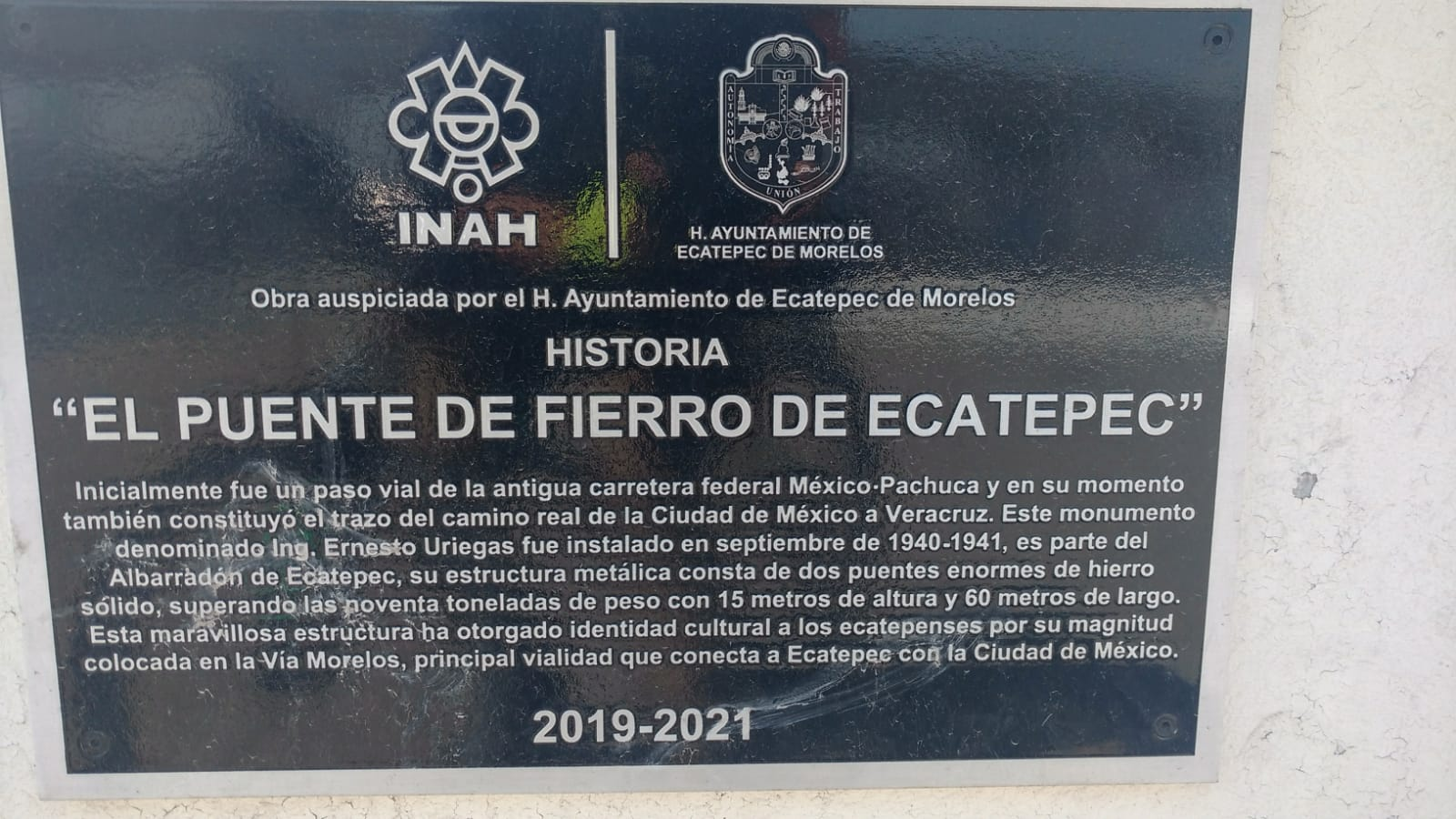
A plaque detailing the bridge's technical aspects and part of its history following its reconstruction in 1940

The bridge is made of iron. It is 33 meters (108 ft) meters long, 6 meters (20 ft) meters wide, and 15 meters (49 ft) meters high and weighs 90 metric tons (89 long tons; 99 short tons). The bridge actually consists of two twin bridges placed together. It is a bowstring truss structure with lattice girders placed on masonry pillars. The platform supports a weight of 0.5 kilograms per square centimeter and the foundations were reinforced with wooden piles of .3 meters (1 ft 0 in) in diameter, which were inserted up to a depth of 12 meters (39 ft).
