= Tlacuilolxochtzin =

- Princess of Ecatepec
- Born: Mexico
- Spouse(s): Tezozomoctli Acolnahuacatl
- Issue: Diego de Alvarado Huanitzin; Don Francisco Matlaccoatzin; Don Carlos Oquiztzin
- Father: Matlaccoatzin

Tlacuilolxochtzin (Nahuatl: tɬakʷilolʃotʃtsin) was an Aztec noblewoman of very noble heritage, Lady of Ecatepec and sister of queen Tlapalizquixochtzin.

== Family ==
She was a Princess - the daughter of Tlatoani Matlaccoatzin and thus granddaughter of the Tlatoani Chimalpilli I.

Tlacuilolxochtzin was a relative to several Aztec Emperors and she married Prince Tezozomoctli Acolnahuacatl of Tenochtitlan.

Their sons were Tlatoani Diego de Alvarado Huanitzin (the first governor of Tenochtitlan), and one lord who went to Spain.
