= Plaza Aragón metro station =

Mexico City Metro station

Plaza Aragón
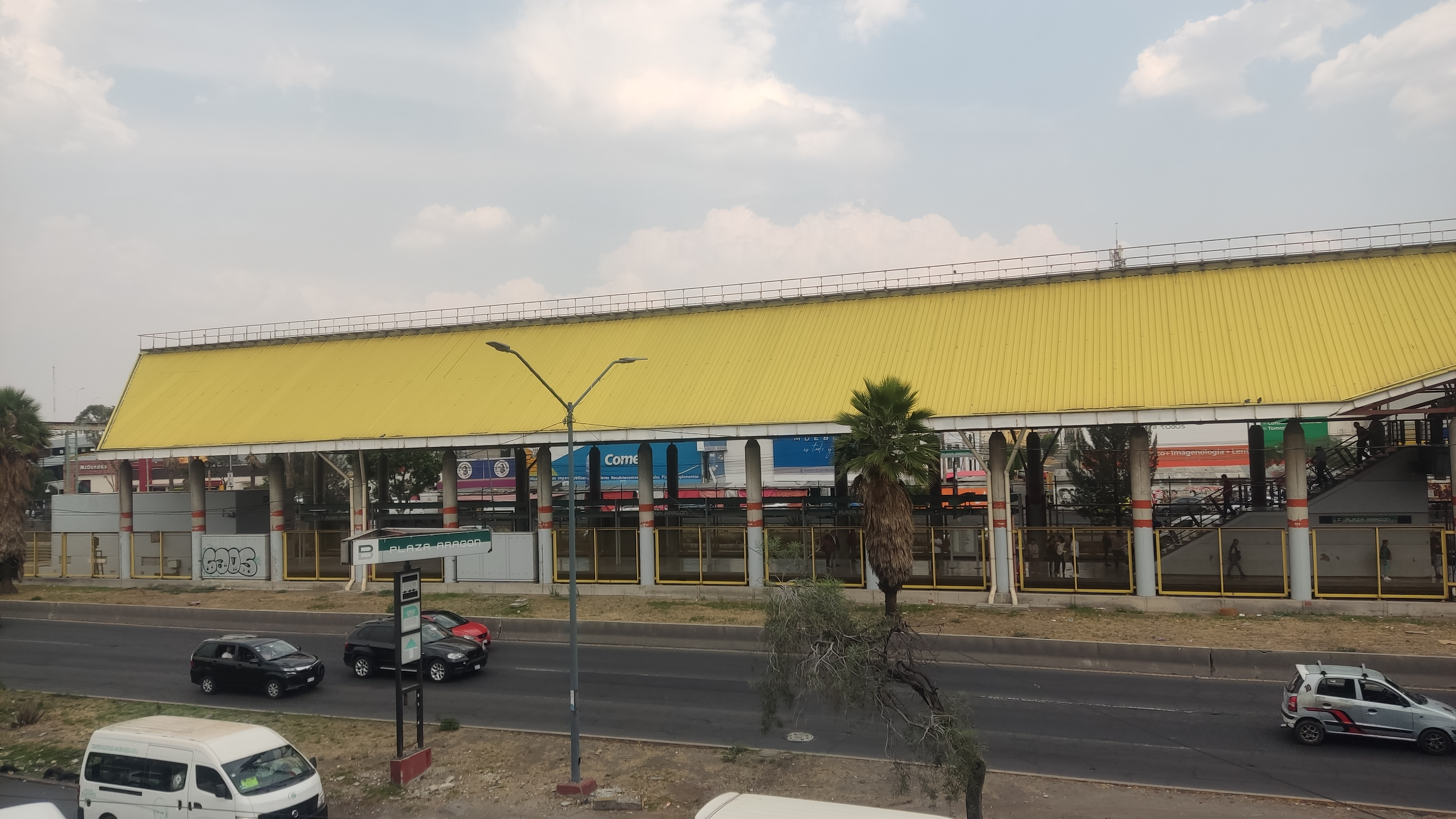
- The station in 2024 along Hank González Avenue

General information
- Location: Carlos Hank González Avenue; Ecatepec de Morelos, State of Mexico; Mexico
- Coordinates: 19°31′42″N 99°01′48″W
- System: Mexico City Metro
- Owner: Government of Mexico City
- Operator: Sistema de Transporte Colectivo (STC)
- Platforms: 1 island platform
- Tracks: 2

Construction
- Structure type: At grade
- Accessible: Yes

Other information
- Status: In service

History
- Opened: 30 November 2000

Passengers
- 2025: 5,657,890 (Note: The data here is limited to the most recent ten years to avoid excessive listings; earlier figures can be found in this page's history or on the Mexico City Metro website. To calculate the average daily ridership, the annual total is divided by 365 days (366 in leap years), with decimals omitted from the result. Each station per line is ranked individually, as the system counts transfer stations separately. The percentage change is calculated automatically using the data from the current year and the previous year.) ▲0.27%
- Rank: 85/195

Services
Preceding station	Mexico City Metro	Following station
Ciudad Azteca Terminus	Line B	Olímpica toward Buenavista
Route map
Location
- Location within Mexico City urban area
- Area map

Plaza Aragón metro station (Note: Estación del Metro Plaza Aragón. Mexican Spanish pronunciation: [ˈplasa (a)ɾaˈɣon]. The name of the station literally means "Aragon Plaza" in Spanish.) is a station of the Mexico City Metro in the colonias (neighborhoods) of Ignacio Allende and Valle de Santiago, in Ecatepec de Morelos, State of Mexico, in the metropolitan area of Mexico City. It is an at-grade station with one island platform served by Line B (the Green-and-Gray Line), between Ciudad Azteca and Olímpica stations. The name of the station references colloquially the nearby Multiplaza Aragón shopping center; its pictogram depicts a representation of a stand of pots from a tianguis, an open-air market. The station was opened on 30 November 2000, on the first day of service between Ciudad Azteca and Buenavista metro stations. The facilities are accessible to people with disabilities as there are elevators, tactile pavings and braille signage plates. In 2019, Plaza Aragón metro station had an average daily ridership of 19,721 passengers, making it the tenth-most used on the line.

== Location ==
Plaza Aragón is a metro station along Carlos Hank González Avenue (also known as Central Avenue), in Ecatepec de Morelos, State of Mexico, a municipality bordering Mexico City. The station serves the colonias (Mexican Spanish for "neighborhoods") of Ignacio Allende and Valle de Santiago. Within the system, the station lies between Ciudad Azteca and Olímpica metro stations.

=== Exits ===
There are two exits:

- North: Carlos Hank González Avenue and Ignacio Zaragoza Street, Ignacio Allende.
- South: Carlos Hank González Avenue and Cegor Avenue, Valle de Santiago.

== History and construction ==
Line B of the Mexico City Metro was built by Empresas ICA; Plaza Aragón metro station opened on 30 November 2000, on the first day of the Ciudad Azteca–Buenavista service. The station was built at-grade level; the Plaza Aragón–Ciudad Azteca section is 574 meters (1,883 ft) long, while the opposite section towards Olímpica metro station measures 709 meters (2,326 ft). The station is accessible to people with disabilities as there are elevators, tactile pavings and braille signage plates. The pedestrian bridges that connect the access to the station are adapted for bicycles as a bicycle lane was built in 2015 on the adjacent median strip. The station's pictogram features the silhouette of a stand of pots from a tianguis, an open-air market; the name references the colloquial denomination for the Multiplaza Aragón shopping center, Mexico's busiest shopping mall as of 2018.

== Ridership ==
According to the data provided by the authorities since the 2000s, and before the impact of the COVID-19 pandemic on public transport, commuters averaged per year between 19,300 and 20,600 daily entrances between 2013 and 2019; the station ridership was 7,198,356 passengers in 2019, which was a decrease of 229,729 passengers compared to 2018. Also in 2019, Plaza Aragón metro station was the 90th busiest station of the system's 195 stations, and it was the line's tenth-most used.

Annual passenger ridership
Year	Ridership	Average daily	Rank	% change	Ref.
2025	5,657,890	15,501	85/195	+0.27%	
2024	5,642,518	15,416	81/195	−4.72%	
2023	5,922,318	16,225	77/195	+5.78%	
2022	5,598,573	15,338	72/195	+26.87%	
2021	4,412,715	12,089	65/195	−6.39%	
2020	4,713,938	12,876	67/195	−34.51%	
2019	7,198,356	19,721	90/195	−3.09%	
2018	7,428,085	20,350	88/195	+5.11%	
2017	7,067,177	19,362	90/195	−5.98%	
2016	7,516,552	20,537	88/195	+1.78%	
