= Olímpica metro station =

Mexico City Metro station

Olímpica
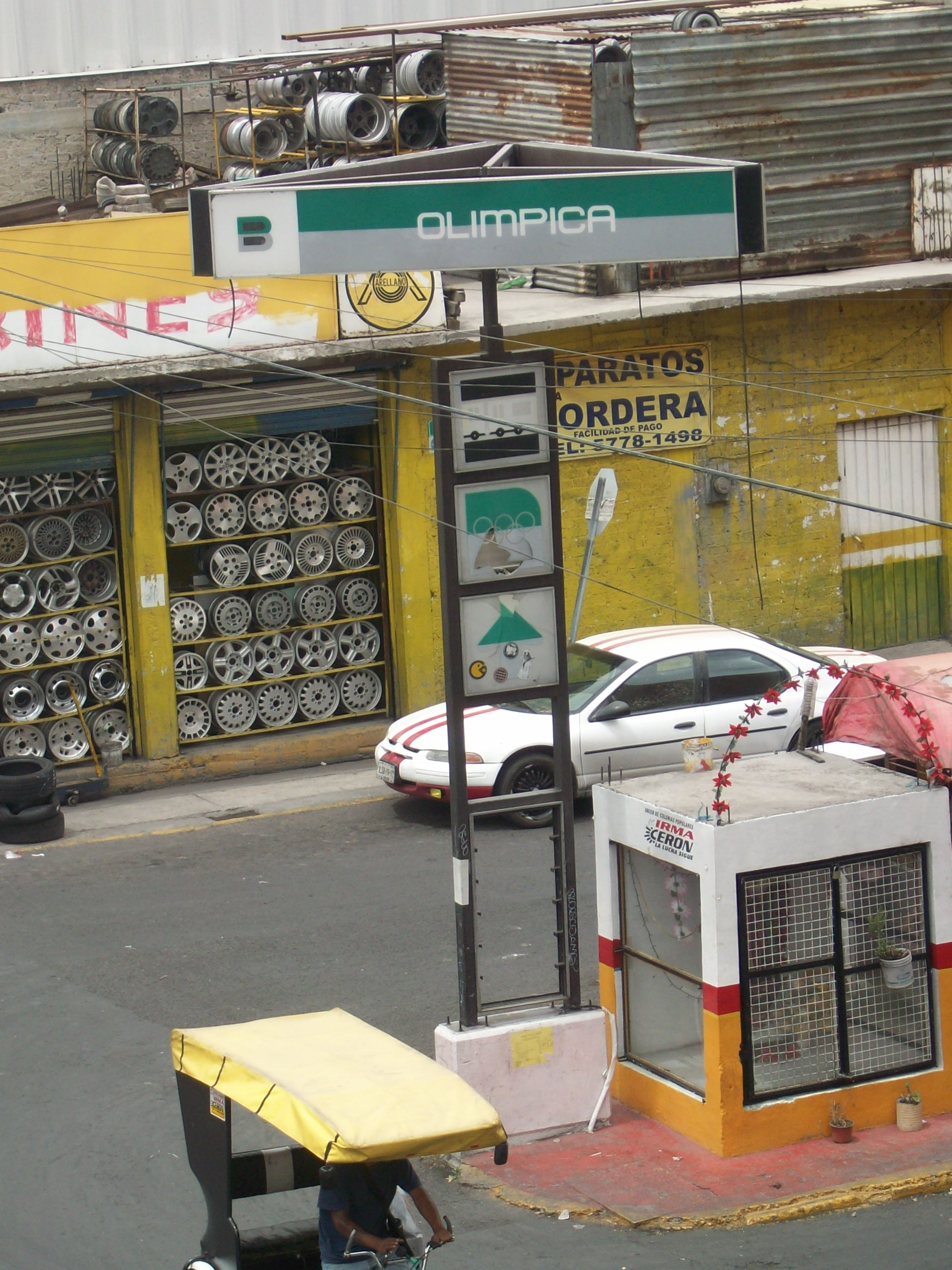
- Station sign, 2011

General information
- Location: Carlos Hank González Avenue; Ecatepec de Morelos, State of Mexico; Mexico
- Coordinates: 19°31′17″N 99°02′00″W
- System: Mexico City Metro
- Owner: Government of Mexico City
- Operator: Sistema de Transporte Colectivo (STC)
- Platforms: 1 island platform
- Tracks: 2

Construction
- Structure type: At grade
- Accessible: Partial

Other information
- Status: In service

History
- Opened: 30 November 2000

Passengers
- 2025: 5,275,319 (Note: The data here is limited to the most recent ten years to avoid excessive listings; earlier figures can be found in this page's history or on the Mexico City Metro website. To calculate the average daily ridership, the annual total is divided by 365 days (366 in leap years), with decimals omitted from the result. Each station per line is ranked individually, as the system counts transfer stations separately. The percentage change is calculated automatically using the data from the current year and the previous year.) ▲2.61%
- Rank: 98/195

Services
Preceding station	Mexico City Metro	Following station
Plaza Aragón toward Ciudad Azteca	Line B	Ecatepec toward Buenavista
Route map
Location
- Location within Mexico City urban area
- Area map

Olímpica metro station (Note: Estación del Metro Olímpica. Spanish pronunciation: [oˈlimpika]. The name of the station literally means "Olympic" in Spanish.) is a station of the Mexico City Metro in the colonias (neighborhoods) of Jardines de Aragón and La Olímpica II, in Ecatepec de Morelos, State of Mexico, in the metropolitan area of Mexico City. It is an at-grade station with one island platform served by Line B (the Green-and-Gray Line), between Plaza Aragón and Ecatepec stations. The name of the station references the colonia of the same name and its pictogram depicts the Olympic rings. The station was opened on 30 November 2000, on the first day of service between Ciudad Azteca and Buenavista metro stations. The facilities are accessible to people with disabilities as there are tactile pavings and braille signage plates. In 2019, Olímpica metro station had an average daily ridership of 16,745 passengers, making it the eleventh most used on the line.

== Location ==
Olímpica is a metro station along Carlos Hank González Avenue (also known as Central Avenue), in Ecatepec de Morelos, State of Mexico, a municipality bordering Mexico City. The station serves the colonias (Mexican Spanish for "neighborhoods") of Fuentes de Aragón, Jardines de Aragón and La Olímpica II. Within the system, it lies between Plaza Aragón and Ecatepec metro stations.

=== Exits ===
There are two exits:

- North: Carlos Hank González Avenue and Valle de Sagitario Street, Fuentes de Aragón.
- South: Carlos Hank González Avenue and Grecia Street, La Olímpica II.

== History and construction ==
Line B of the Mexico City Metro was built by Empresas ICA; Olímpica metro station opened on 30 November 2000, on the first day of the Ciudad Azteca–Buenavista service. The station was built at-grade level; the Olímpica–Plaza Aragón section is 709 meters (2,326 ft) long, while the opposite section towards Ecatepec metro station measures 596 meters (1,955 ft). The station is partially accessible to people with disabilities as there are tactile pavings and braille signage plates. The pedestrian bridges that connect the access to the station are adapted for bicycles as a bicycle lane was built in 2015 on the adjacent median strip. The station's pictogram features the silhouette of the five interlocked Olympic rings as a reference to the colonia of the same name; the etymology of the word olímpica is related to the southern town of Olympia, Greece, and the Mount Olympus, in Northern Greece.

From 23 April to 28 June 2020, the station was temporarily closed due to the COVID-19 pandemic in Mexico. The closure was protested by taxi drivers serving the station's area.

== Ridership ==
According to the data provided by the authorities since the 2000s, and before the impact of the COVID-19 pandemic on public transport, commuters averaged per year between 16,700 and 20,400 daily entrances between 2013 and 2019; the station ridership was 6,112,152 passengers in 2019, which was an increase of 244,639 passengers compared to 2018. Also in 2019, Olímpica metro station was the 109th busiest station of the system's 195 stations, and it was the line's eleventh-most used.

Annual passenger ridership
Year	Ridership	Average daily	Rank	% change	Ref.
2025	5,275,319	14,452	98/195	+2.61%	
2024	5,140,915	14,046	90/195	−2.89%	
2023	5,293,741	14,503	87/195	+4.45%	
2022	5,068,269	13,885	88/195	+25.42%	
2021	4,040,957	11,071	75/195	+30.52%	
2020	3,096,098	8,459	115/195	−49.35%	
2019	6,112,152	16,745	109/195	−3.85%	
2018	6,356,791	17,415	103/195	+1.23%	
2017	6,279,368	17,203	106/195	−5.60%	
2016	6,651,719	18,174	101/195	+0.04%	
