= Multiplaza Aragón =

Shopping center in Ecatepec, Mexico

Coordinates: 19.5296664°N 99.0273059°W

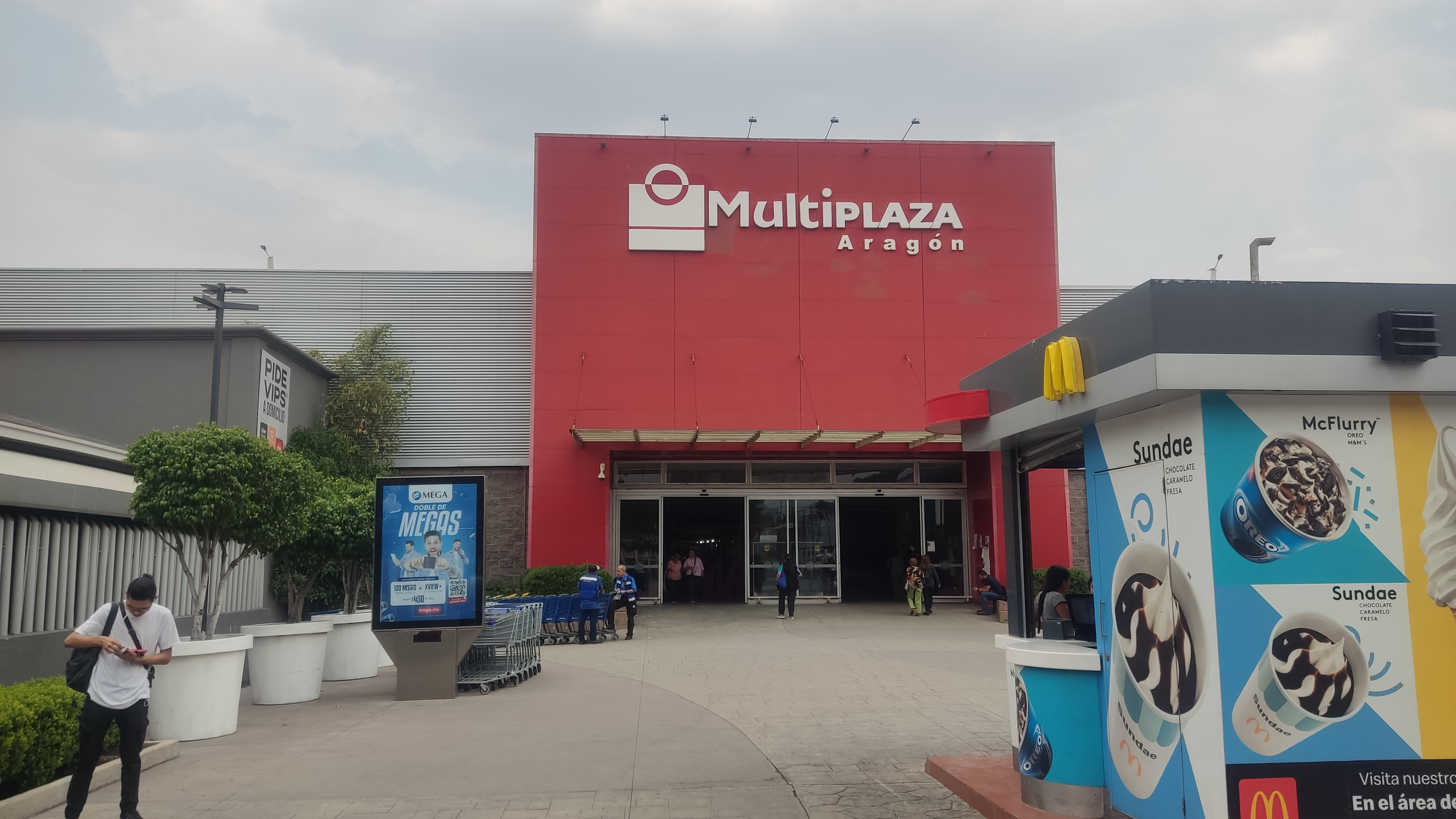
The shopping center in 2024

Multiplaza Aragón is a shopping center in Ecatepec, in Greater Mexico City, opened in 1978. As of 2018, it had the highest number of visitors of any shopping center in the metropolitan area, 2.8 million visitors per month. As of 2023, the shopping center was the second-most visited, only after Perisur.

Gross leasable area is 138,304 square metres (1,488,690 sq ft). The mall has over 400 stores. Anchors are three hypermarkets: Walmart, Sam's Club, Bodega Aurrerá; midrange department stores Suburbia and Coppel; and Cinépolis multicinemas.

The Plaza Aragón metro station is adjacent to the south end of the mall, while the Ciudad Azteca metro and Mexibús stations are a short walk from the north end.
