= Teotlalco =

Empress consort of the Aztec Empire Queen consort of Tenochtitlan
- Tenure: 1502–1520 (estimated)
- Co-consort: Tlapalizquixochtzin
- Spouse: Moctezuma II
- Issue: Isabel Moctezuma, etc.
- Father: Matlaccohuatl

Teotlalco (Nahuatl pronunciation:[teotɬálko]) was a Nahua princess of Ecatepec and Aztec empress—the Queen of Tenochtitlan.

== Family ==
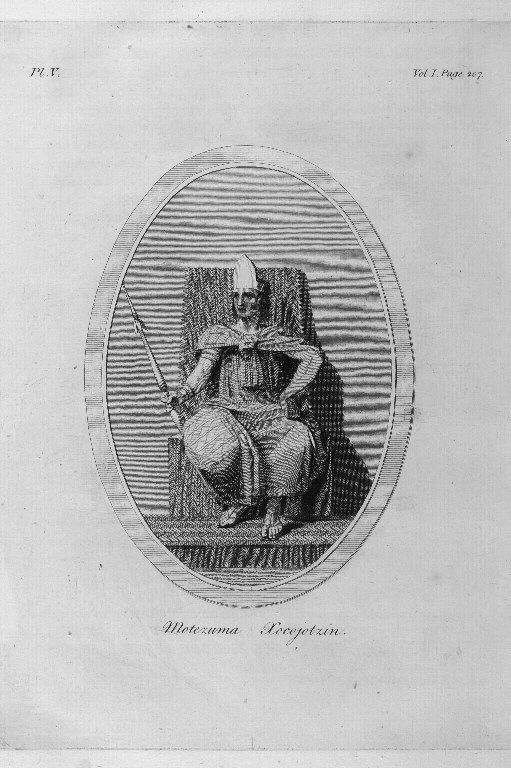
Teotlalco's husband, Moctezuma II

Teotlalco's father was King Matlaccohuatl. She married Emperor Moctezuma II of Tenochtitlan. The first contact between Indigenous civilizations of Mesoamerica and Europeans took place during his reign, and he was killed. Teotlalco was Moctezuma's principal wife and mother of Doña Isabel Moctezuma, wife of the king Cuitláhuac. Her grandchild was Leonor Cortés Moctezuma.

== See also ==
- List of Tenochtitlan rulers
- Tlapalizquixochtzin
- Aztec emperors family tree

Regnal titles
Preceded by Wives of Ahuitzotl	Queen of Tenochtitlan; 1502–1520 (estimated)	Succeeded by Wives of Cuitláhuac
