= Sacred Heart of Jesus Cathedral, Ecatepec =

Coordinates: 19.5994°N 99.0467°W

Sacred Heart of Jesus Cathedral
- Catedral del Sagrado Corazón de Jesús
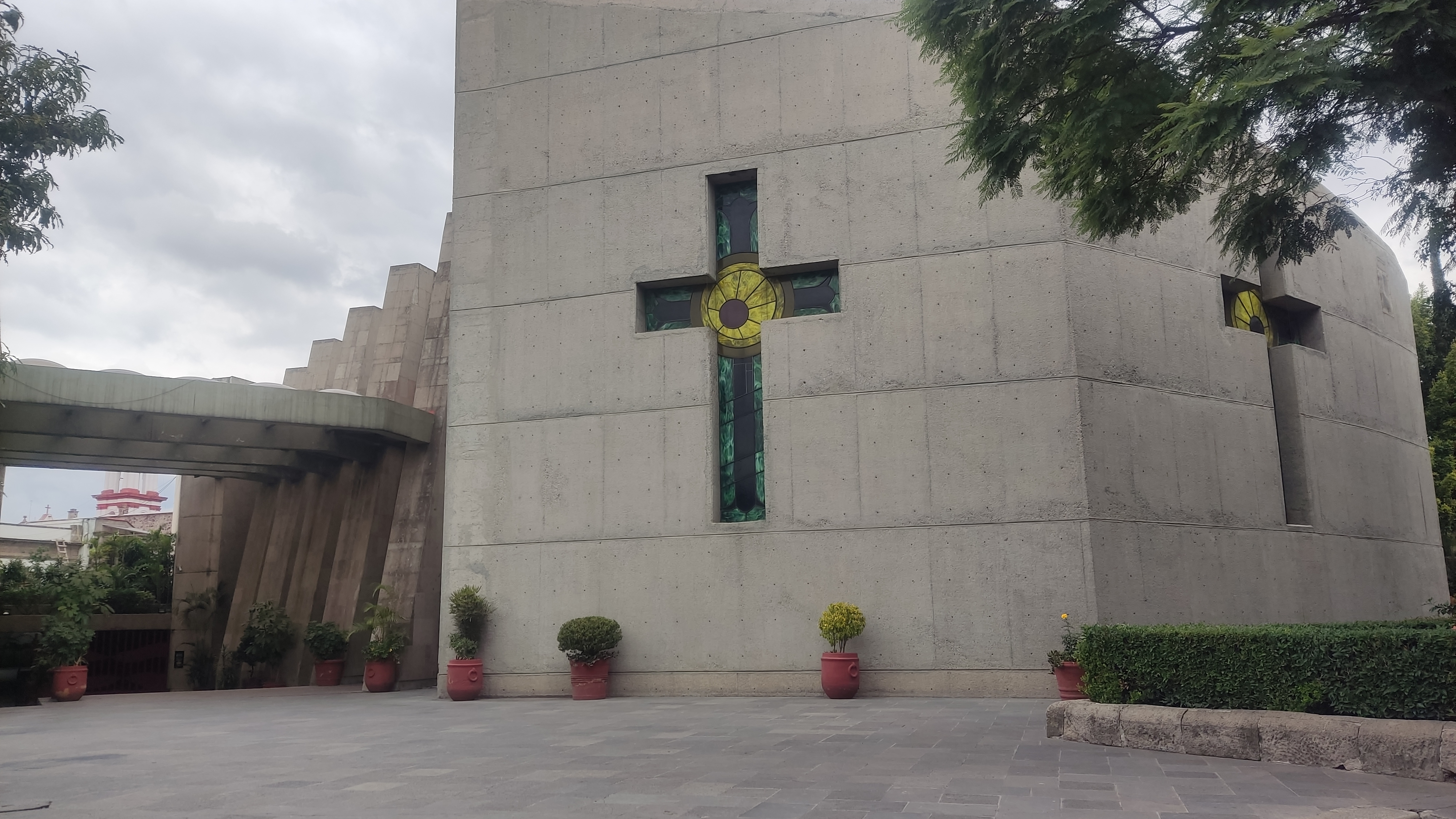
- Sacred Heart of Jesus Cathedral
- Location: Ecatepec
- Country: Mexico
- Denomination: Roman Catholic Church

The Sacred Heart of Jesus Cathedral (Spanish: Catedral del Sagrado Corazón de Jesús), also Ecatepec Cathedral, is the main Catholic church and seat of the Diocese of Ecatepec in Mexico. It is dedicated to the Sacred Heart of Jesus. It is located in the municipality of Ecatepec, in the State of Mexico.

It was inaugurated in March 1999 in the neighborhood of San Cristóbal. Its construction, begun on January 6, 1998, is modernist, similar to that of the Basilica of Guadalupe, simulating a tent for pilgrims.

More than 70 churches are dependent on this diocese.

On Sundays, as in all Catholic churches, Masses are celebrated, accompanied by musical groups such as students, musicians and vocalists such as the music ministry Sabath and even Mariachi, which incidentally gives a folk form to this religious act.

== See also ==
- Roman Catholicism in Mexico
- Sacred Heart Cathedral

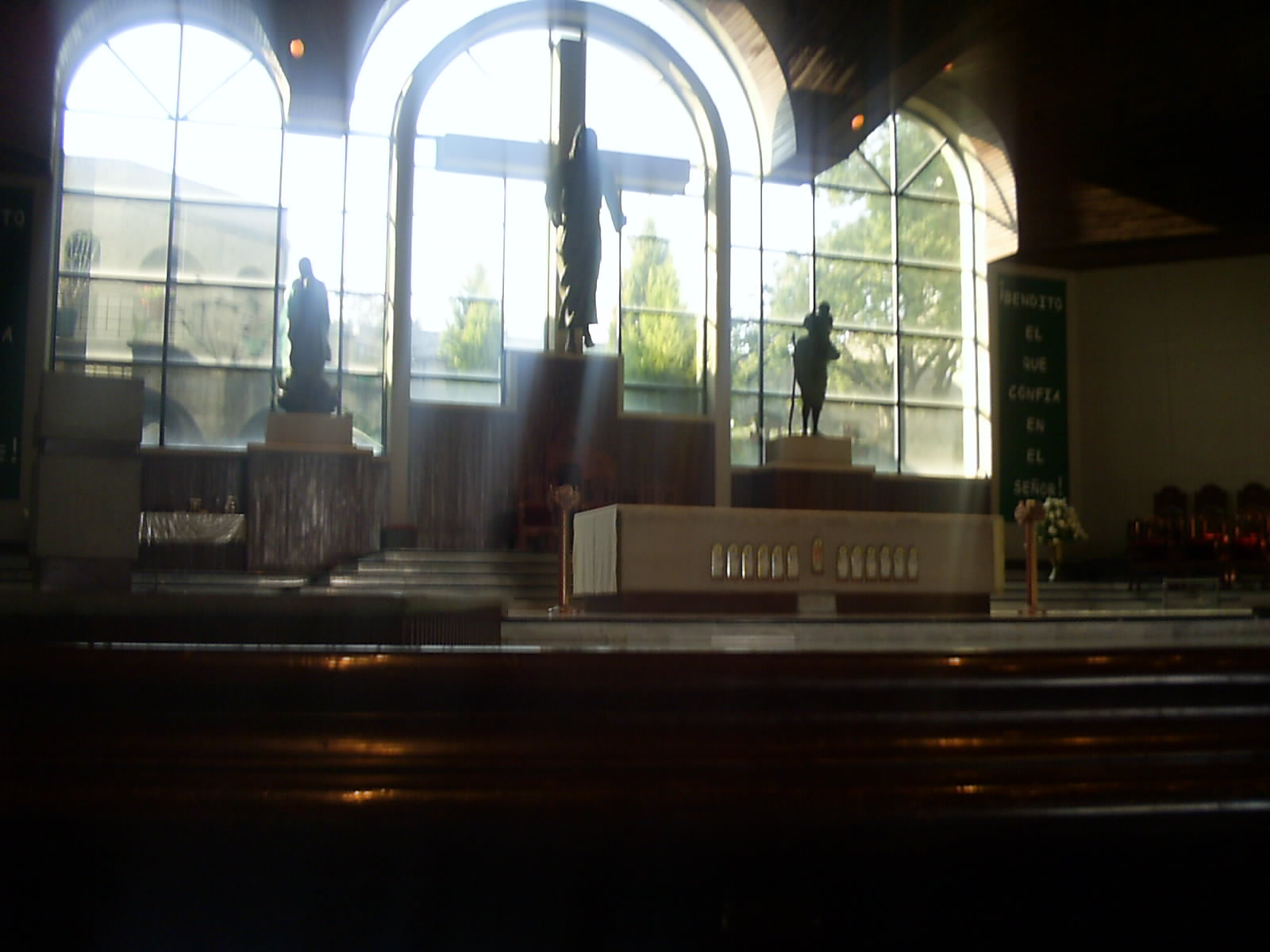
Internal view
