= Matlaccohuatl =

Ruler in pre-Columbian Mesoamerica

Tlatoani of Ecatepec
- Predecessor: Tezozomoc
- Successor: Chimalpilli II
- Issue: Teotlalco

Matlaccohuatl was the third Tlatoani (ruler) of Ecatepec, a Nahua altepetl.

== Biography ==
He was a successor of the tlatoani Tezozomoc, who was a son of tlatoani Chimalpopoca, ruler of Tenochtitlan.

His daughter was Teotlalco, wife of an tlatoani Moctezuma II and mother of Isabel Moctezuma.

The successor of Matlaccohuatl in Ecatepec altepetl was Chimalpilli II.
