= Tlapalizquixochtzin =

Queen regnant of Ecatepec
- Reign: c. early 16th century

Empress consort of the Aztec Empire Queen consort of Tenochtitlan
- Tenure: c. early 16th century
- Co-consort: Teotlalco
- Spouse: Moctezuma II
- Issue: Francisca de Moctezuma
- Father: Matlaccoatzin

Tlapalizquixochtzin was an Aztec noblewoman and Queen regnant of the Aztec city of Ecatepec. She was also a consort of Moctezuma II.

== Family ==
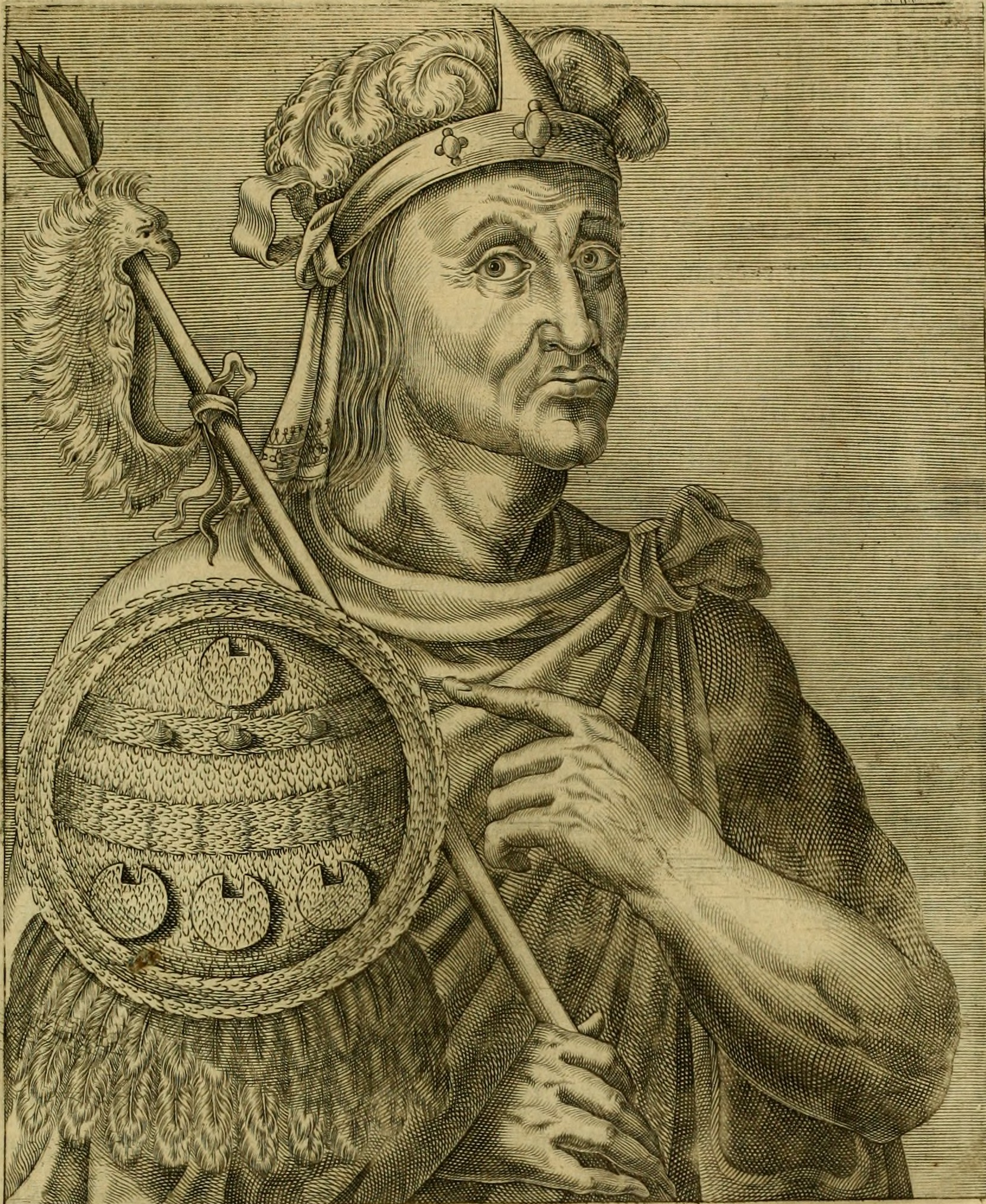
Moctezuma II, husband of Tlapalizquixochtzin

She was born as a Princess – daughter of Matlaccoatzin and thus a granddaughter of the King Chimalpilli I and sister of Princess Tlacuilolxochtzin.

Tlapalizquixochtzin married Aztec emperor Moctezuma II (c. 1466 – June 1520). Their daughter was Doña Francisca de Moctezuma.

Her nephew was King Diego de Alvarado Huanitzin.

== See also ==
- List of Tenochtitlan rulers
- Teotlalco
- Azcasuch
- Aztec emperors family tree

Royal titles
Preceded by Wives of Ahuitzotl	Queen consort of Tenochtitlan; 1502–1520 (estimated)	Succeeded by Wives of Cuitláhuac
