= Francisca de Moctezuma =

Daughter of Moctezuma II

- Spouse: Diego de Alvarado Huanitzin; Pedro de Alvarado Temictzin
- Father: Moctezuma II
- Mother: Tlapalizquixochtzin

Doña Francisca de Moctezuma was the daughter of Moctezuma II and Tlapalizquixochtzin. Francisca lived in Ecatepec during the fall of Tenochtitlan. She married Diego de Alvarado Huanitzin, and after Diego's death, Francisca married his brother Pedro de Alvarado Temictzin.
