= Tezozomoc of Ecatepec =

Tezozomoc
- Tlatoani of Ecatepec
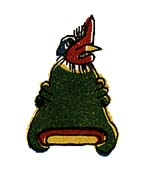
- Glyph of Ecatepec
- Successor: Matlaccohuatl
- Father: Chimalpopoca
- Mother: Matlalatzin?

Tezozomoc (modern Nahuatl pronunciation) was the second tlatoani (ruler) of altepetl Ecatepec, in 15th-century Mesoamerica.

== Biography ==
Tezozomoc was a son of an Aztec tlatoani Chimalpopoca, ruler of Tenochtitlan. His mother may have been Matlalatzin.

He was a grandson of tlatoani Huitzilihuitl and Ayauhcihuatl, who was a daughter of the Tepanec tlatoani Tezozomoc, ruler of Azcapotzalco.

He was a relative of and successor tlatoani to Chimalpilli I in 1465. His successor was Matlaccohuatl.

Preceded by Chimalpilli I	Tlatoani of Ecatepec; 1465-????	Succeeded by Matlaccohuatl
