= Ecatepec metro station =

Mexico City metro station

Ecatepec
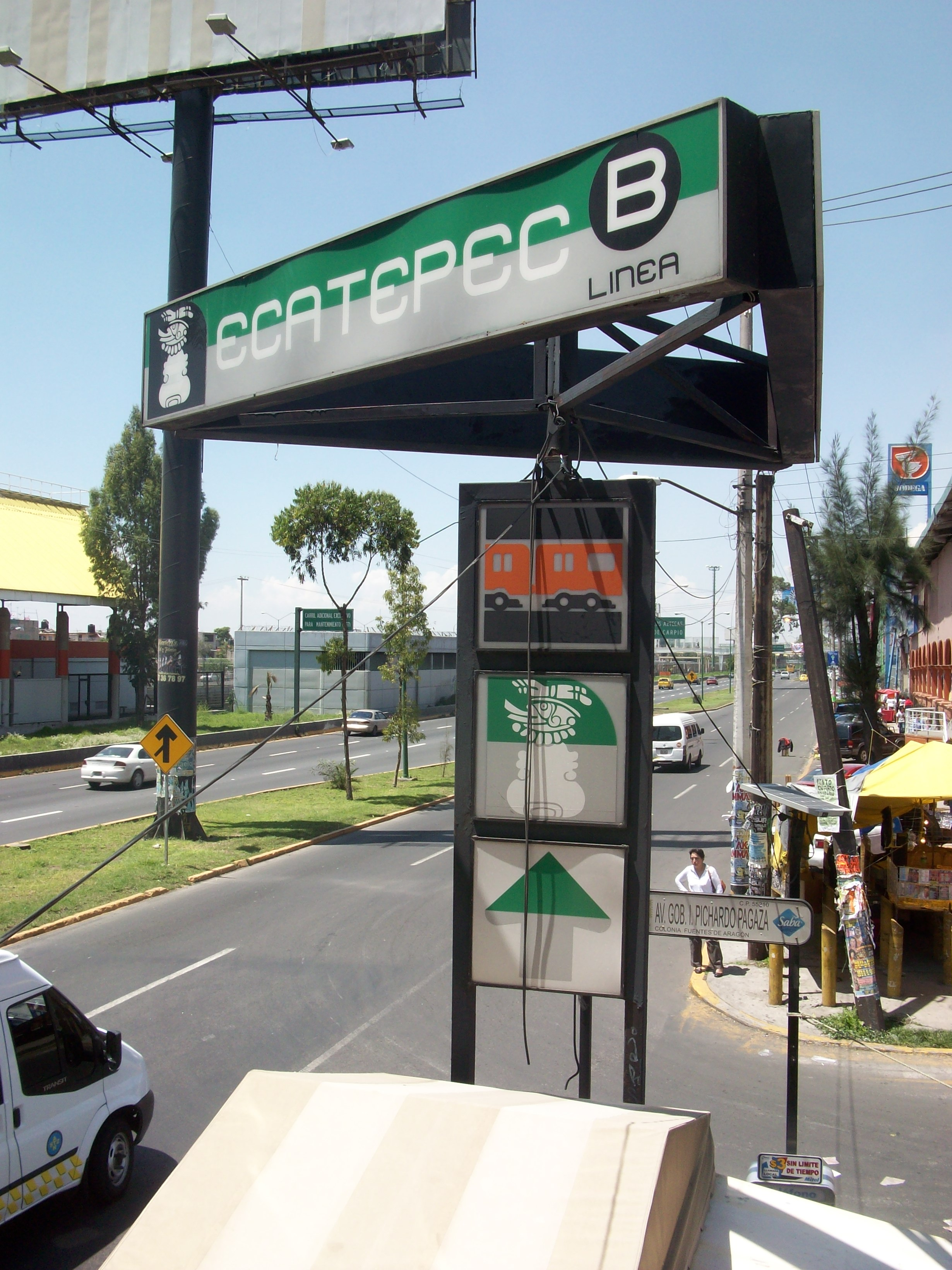

General information
- Location: Ecatepec, State of Mexico; Mexico
- Coordinates: 19°30′55″N 99°02′10″W
- System: Mexico City Metro
- Platforms: 1 island platform
- Tracks: 2

Construction
- Structure type: At grade

History
- Opened: 30 November 2000
- Former names: Tecnológico

Passengers
- 2025: 7,737,382 (Note: The data here is limited to the most recent ten years to avoid excessive listings; earlier figures can be found in this page's history or on the Mexico City Metro website. To calculate the average daily ridership, the annual total is divided by 365 days (366 in leap years), with decimals omitted from the result. Each station per line is ranked individually, as the system counts transfer stations separately. The percentage change is calculated automatically using the data from the current year and the previous year.) ▼1.34%
- Rank: 51/195

Services
Preceding station	Mexico City Metro	Following station
Olímpica toward Ciudad Azteca	Line B	Múzquiz toward Buenavista
Route map
Location
- Location within Mexico City urban area
- Area map

Ecatepec (until August 25, 2008, called Tecnológico) is a station on Line B of the Mexico City Metro system. It is in the Ecatepec de Morelos city in the State of Mexico adjacent to Mexico City. The station opened on November 30, 2000, under its original name, Metro Tecnológico. The station's icon was the emblem of the Tecnológico de Estudios Superiores de Ecatepec, whose facilities are located nearby. On 23 July 2008, Francisco Bojórquez Hernández, director of the Sistema de Transporte Colectivo Metro, and José Luis Gutiérrez Cureño, Ecatepec's municipal president, established an agreement to improve the security, quality, and efficacy of the services at the station. As part of their agreement, they decided to change the name and iconography of the station. On August 25, 2008, Metro Tecnológico was renamed Metro Ecatepec, after the neighborhood where it is located. The updated station logo shows a Mexica based icon of Ehecatépetl a mountain whose top is the god of wind Ehecatl.

== Ridership ==
Annual passenger ridership
Year	Ridership	Average daily	Rank	% change	Ref.
2025	7,737,382	21,198	51/195	−1.34%
2024	7,842,430	21,427	46/195	+1.05%
2023	7,760,621	21,261	47/195	+6.25%
2022	7,303,818	20,010	44/195	+50.48%
2021	4,853,732	13,297	54/195	+7.70%
2020	4,506,517	12,312	75/195	−53.73%
2019	9,740,169	26,685	53/195	−1.89%
2018	9,927,920	27,199	51/195	+3.06%
2017	9,633,286	26,392	50/195	−7.37%
2016	10,399,823	28,414	48/195	−0.02%
