= Tezozomoctli (Cuitlahuac Tizic) =

Tlatoani of Cuitlahuac Tizic
- In office 1 Reed – 4 Reed; 1415–1483
- Preceded by: Tepolitzmaitl
- Succeeded by: Xochiololtzin

Personal details
- Born: 5 Rabbit (1415)
- Died: 4 Reed (1483)

Tezozomoctli (c. 1406–1483) was the tlatoani (ruler) of Tizic, a subdivision of the pre-Columbian Nahua state of Cuitlahuac, from the year 1 Reed (1415) until his death in the year 4 Reed (1483).

== Notes ==
Preceded by Tepolitzmaitl	Tlatoani of Cuitlahuac Tizic; 1 Reed – 4 Reed; 1415–1483	Succeeded by Xochiololtzin
