= Chimalpilli II =

Tlatoani of Ecatepec
- Predecessor: Matlaccohuatl
- Successor: Diego de Alvarado Huanitzin
- Dynasty: Royal family of Tenochtitlan
- Father: Ahuitzotl
- Mother: Unknown

Chimalpilli II (died in year 2 Técpatl) was a Tlatoani (ruler) of the Nahua altepetl (city-state) Ecatepec, in 16th-century Mesoamerica.

The first known tlatoani of Ecatepec was Chimalpilli I, grandson of an Aztec tlatoani.

The successor of Chimalpilli II was Diego de Alvarado Huanitzin, who also became tlatoani of Tenochtitlan, as well as its governor (Cabildo of San Juan Tenochtitlan) under the colonial Spanish system of government.

== Family ==
Chimalpilli was a son of Aztec tlatoani Ahuitzotl and grandson of Atotoztli II (daughter of Moctezuma I) and Tezozomoc. He was a nephew of tlatoani Axayacatl and Tizoc and of Chalchiuhnenetzin; and cousin of Moctezuma II and Cuitláhuac.

His brother was tlatoani Cuauhtémoc.

== See also ==
- List of Tenochtitlan rulers
- Isabel Moctezuma, sister-in-law of Chimalpilli
