= Tezozomoctli Acolnahuacatl =

Aztec noble

- Issue: Diego de Alvarado Huanitzin
- Father: Axayacatl

Tezozomoctli Acolnahuacatl was an Aztec-Nahua noble son of the Nahua tlatoani Axayacatl of the Tlatoque of Ecatepec.

He was a brother of Aztec tlatoani Moctezuma II of Tenochtitlan.

He was the father of Diego de Alvarado Huanitzin, and grandfather of Fernando Alvarado Tezozomoc of the Viceroyalty of New Spain (colonial México).

== See also ==
- Moctezuma family
- Tlatoque of Ecatepec

== Bibliography ==
- Castañeda de la Paz, María (14 November 2013). "Dos parcialidades étnicas en Azcapotzalco: Mexicapan y Tepanecapan" [Two Ethnic parcialidades in Azcapotzalco: Mexicapan and Tepanecapan]. Estudios de Cultura Náhuatl (in Spanish). 46. Ciudad Universitaria, Coyoacán, Mexico City, MX: Instituto de Investigaciones Históricas, Universidad Nacional Autónoma de México: 223–248. ISSN 0071-1675 – via SciELO Mexico.
- Guzmán Bravo, José Antonio (2018-12-30). "La Música Ceremonial Mexica" [The Mexica Ceremonial Music]. Anuario Musical (in Spanish) (73): 37–52. doi:10.3989/anuariomusical.2018.73.03. eISSN 1988-4125. ISSN 0211-3538.
- Schroeder, Susan (27 July 2011). "The Truth about the Crónica Mexicayotl". Colonial Latin American Review. 20 (2): 233–247. doi:10.1080/10609164.2011.587268. ISSN 1060-9164.
