= Ecatepec de Morelos =

Ecatepec de Morelos Ecatepec
- City and municipality
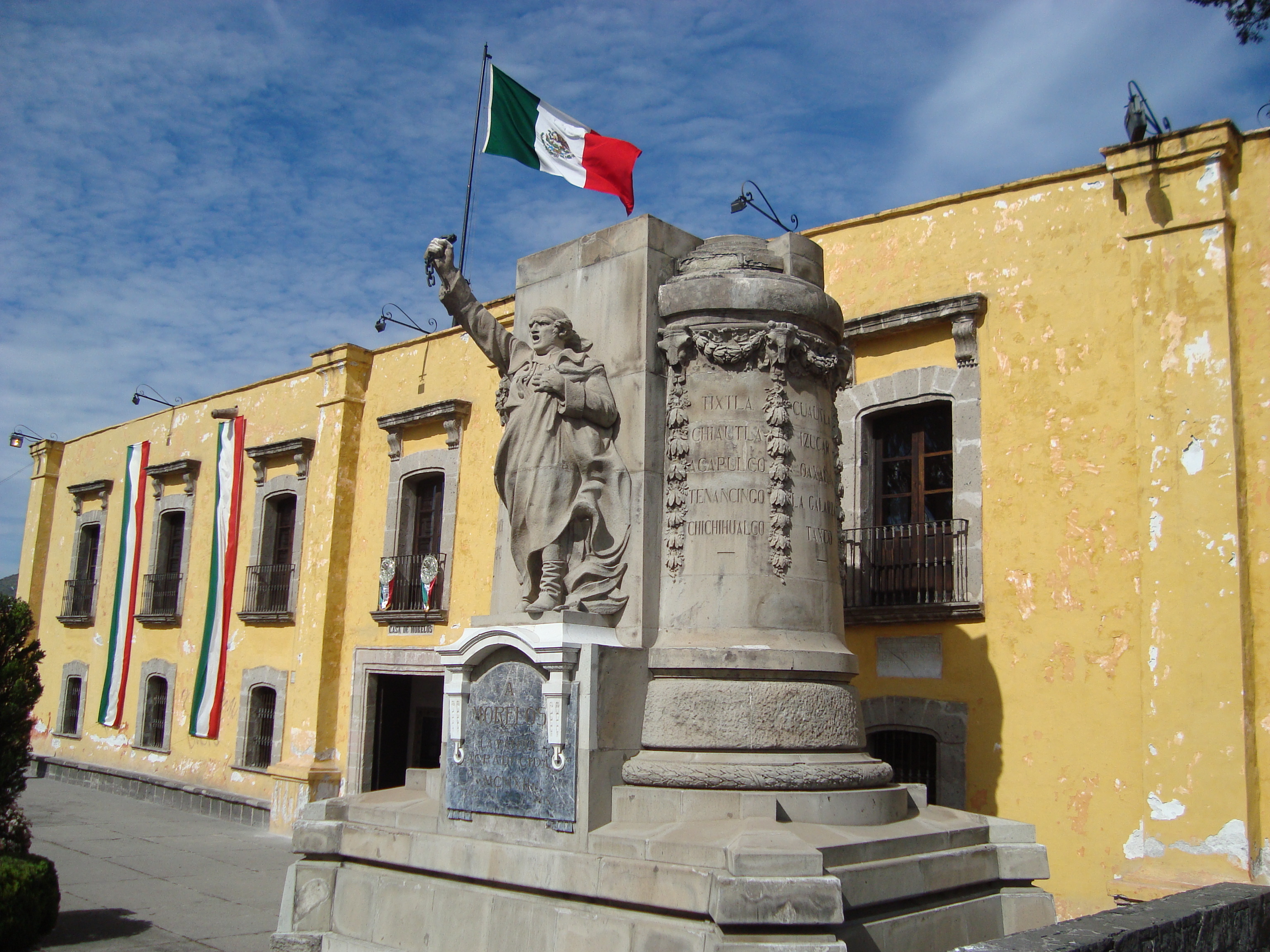
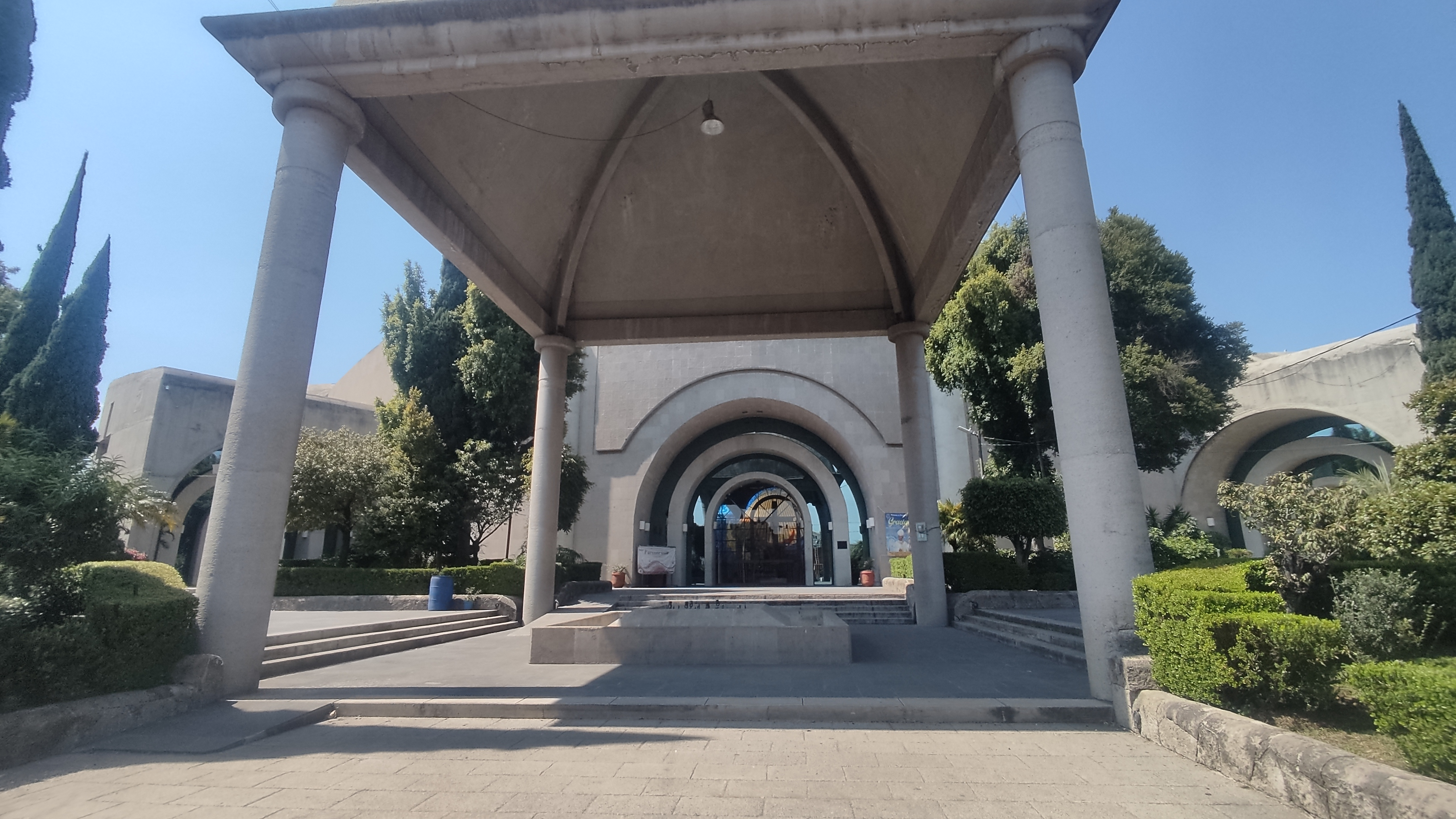
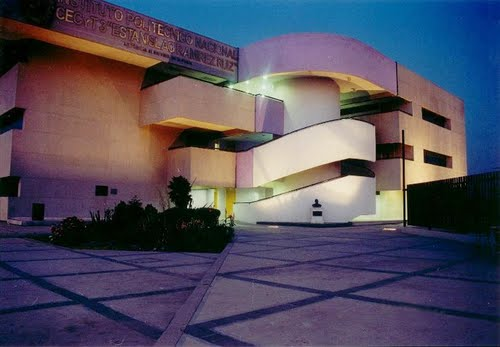
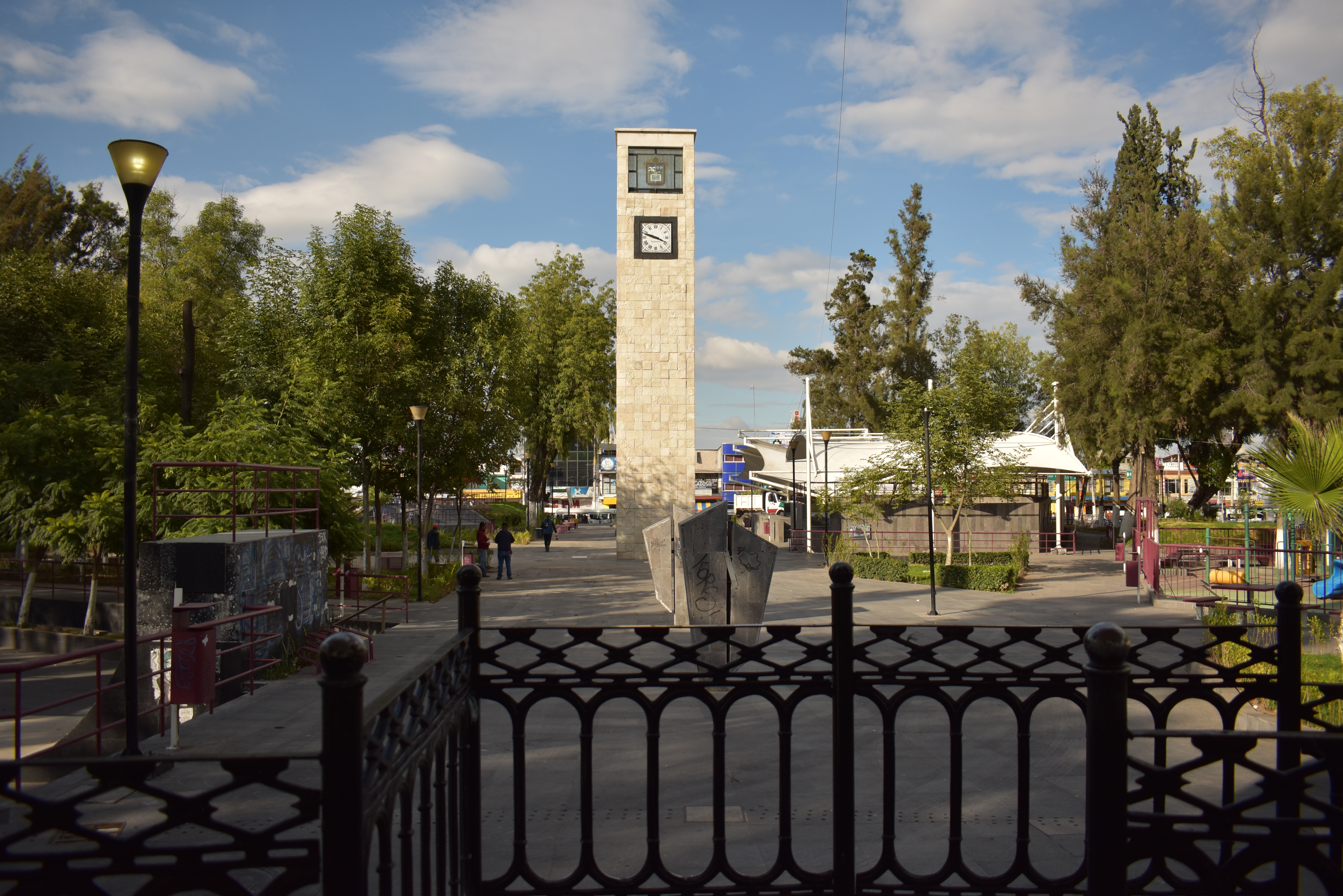
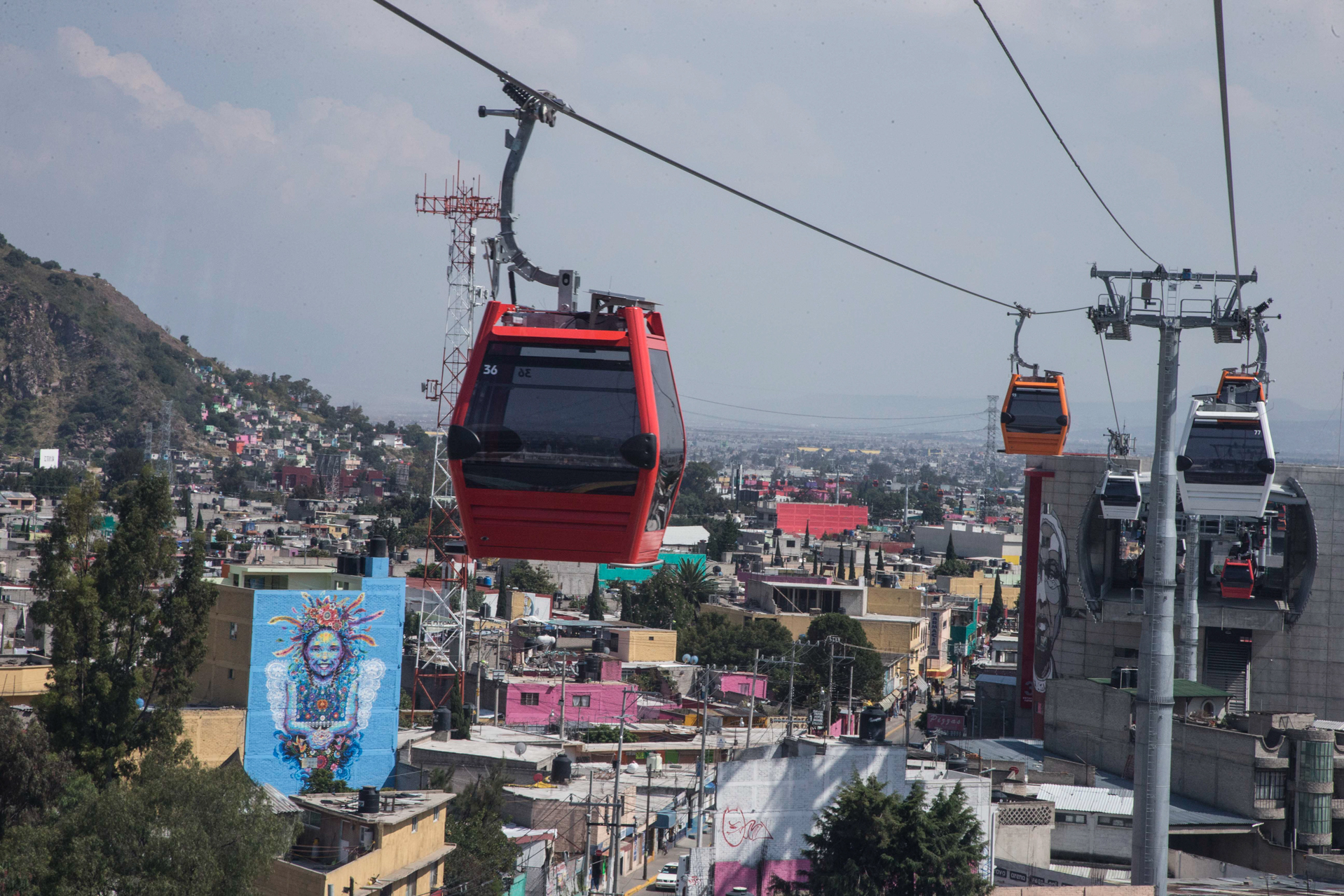
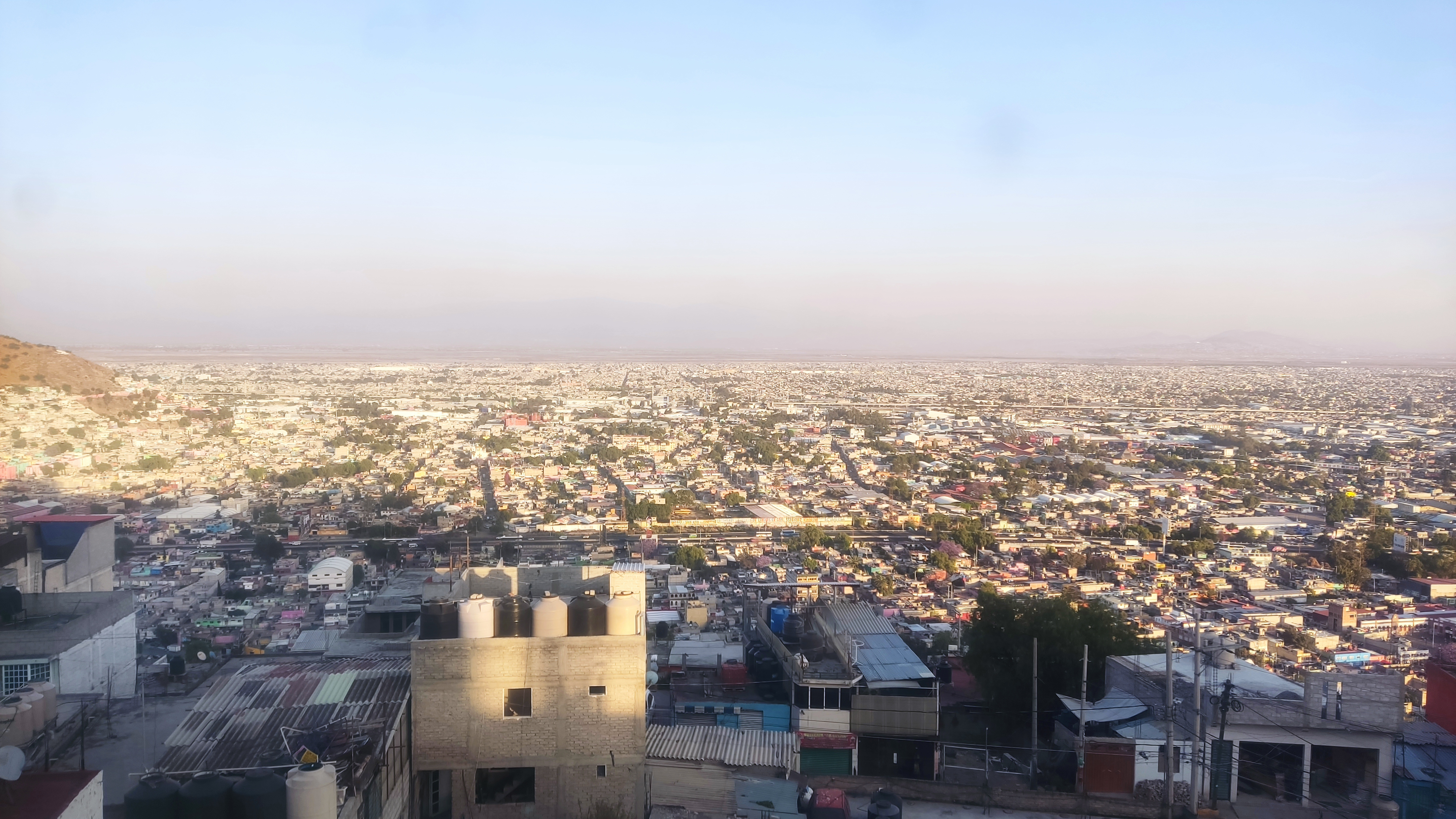
- Clockwise, from top: Casa de Morelos Museum, CECyT 3, Mexicable cable car, View of the city, San Cristóbal Centro and Sacred Heart of Jesus Cathedral.

- Coat of arms
- Motto: Autonomía, Unión, Trabajo (Autonomy, Union, Work)
- Location of Ecatepec in the State of Mexico

- Location within Mexico
- Coordinates: 19°36′35″N 99°03′36″W
- Country: Mexico
- State: State of Mexico
- Metro area: Greater Mexico City
- Region: Ecatepec Region
- Municipal status: 13 October 1877
- Municipal Seat: San Cristóbal Centro

Government
  - Type: Ayuntamiento
  - Municipal president: Azucena Cisneros Coss (2025–2027)

Area
  - Total: 156.2 km^{2} (60.3 sq mi)
  - Water: 0.00 km^{2} (0 sq mi)
- Elevation (of seat): 2,250 m (7,380 ft)

Population (2020)
  - Total: 1,645,352
  - Rank: 9th in North America; 3rd in Mexico
  - Density: 10,530/km^{2} (27,280/sq mi)
  - Seat: 1,643,623
  - Metro area: 21,804,515
- Time zone: UTC−06:00 (Zona Centro)
- Postal code (of seat): 55000
- Area code: 55
- Demonym: Ecatepequense
- Website: Official website (in Spanish)

Ecatepec (Spanish: [ekateˈpek]), officially Ecatepec de Morelos, is a municipality in the State of Mexico situated in the north of the Greater Mexico City urban area. The municipal seat is San Cristóbal Ecatepec.

The city of Ecatepec is co-extensive with the municipality, comprising 99% of the total population of 1,645,352. It is Mexico's third most-populous municipality after Tijuana and the 16 boroughs of Mexico City. It is also the most-populous suburb of Greater Mexico City.

The name "Ecatepec" is derived from Nahuatl and means "windy hill" or "hill devoted to Ehecatl" (the wind god). It was also an alternative name for or invocation of the god Quetzalcoatl. "Morelos" refers to José María Morelos, a hero of the Mexican War of Independence. Saint Christopher is the city's patron saint, celebrated on July 25.

Ecatepec is served by the Mexico City metro, by the State of Mexico's Mexibús bus rapid transit lines, and by Mexicable aerial cable car lines.

Points of interest include the Catedral del Sagrado Corazón de Jesús, several colonial era churches, and the Morelos Museum in Casa de los Virreyes. Mexico's busiest shopping center, Multiplaza Aragón, is also located in Ecatepec.

== Geography ==
The municipality is located north of Mexico City. San Cristóbal Ecatepec, the municipal seat, has governing jurisdiction over the communities of San Pedro Xoloxtoc, Tulpetlac, Chiconautla, Ciudad Azteca, and Villa de Aragón. It has an area of 156.2 square kilometres (60.3 sq mi) and borders the municipalities of Tlalnepantla de Baz, Tecámac, Coacalco de Berriozábal, Jaltenco, Acolman, Texcoco, Atenco, and Nezahualcóyotl and the Mexico City borough of Gustavo A. Madero.

The settlements in Ecatepec de Morelos are located in an elongated valley, spreading from the Valley of Mexico to Sierra de Guadalupe.

=== Flora and fauna ===
Most of the local flora and fauna live in the Sierra de Guadalupe. Animals include small mammals, like mice, rabbits, gray squirrels, and gophers, and birds, such as cenzontles and sparrows. There are no large animals. The flora includes oyamel pines, oaks, ocote pines, century plants, prickly pears, and zacatón (mountain grass).

=== Climate ===
Ecatepec has a oceanic climate (subtropical highland variety) (Köppen: Cwb).

Climate data for Ecatepec
Month	Jan	Feb	Mar	Apr	May	Jun	Jul	Aug	Sep	Oct	Nov	Dec	Year
Mean daily maximum °C (°F)	21.4 (70.5)	23.6 (74.5)	25.4 (77.7)	26.6 (79.9)	27.0 (80.6)	25.0 (77.0)	23.7 (74.7)	23.6 (74.5)	22.9 (73.2)	22.7 (72.9)	22.4 (72.3)	21.6 (70.9)	23.8 (74.9)
Daily mean °C (°F)	13.7 (56.7)	15.6 (60.1)	17.6 (63.7)	19.3 (66.7)	19.9 (67.8)	18.9 (66.0)	17.7 (63.9)	17.6 (63.7)	17.2 (63.0)	16.3 (61.3)	14.9 (58.8)	13.9 (57.0)	16.9 (62.4)
Mean daily minimum °C (°F)	6.9 (44.4)	8.2 (46.8)	9.9 (49.8)	12.0 (53.6)	13.1 (55.6)	13.6 (56.5)	12.9 (55.2)	13.0 (55.4)	13.0 (55.4)	11.1 (52.0)	8.7 (47.7)	7.1 (44.8)	10.8 (51.4)
Average precipitation mm (inches)	10.2 (0.40)	10.0 (0.39)	11.4 (0.45)	17.9 (0.70)	30.7 (1.21)	130.3 (5.13)	161.6 (6.36)	168.2 (6.62)	164.9 (6.49)	73.0 (2.87)	20.5 (0.81)	6.8 (0.27)	805.5 (31.7)
Average relative humidity (%)	56.0	49.9	45.4	45.4	51.0	62.9	70.4	71.3	73.7	70.5	64.2	58.7	60.0
Mean monthly sunshine hours	253.4	250.5	285.2	295.2	297.7	254.4	257.2	256.9	225.8	240.0	237.7	253.6	3,107.6
Source: Weather.Directory

== History ==
=== Aztec Era ===
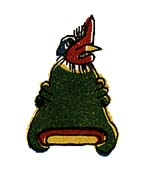
The glyph for Ecatepec. Its name is represented by a hill (tepetl) and the face of the wind god (Ehecatl).

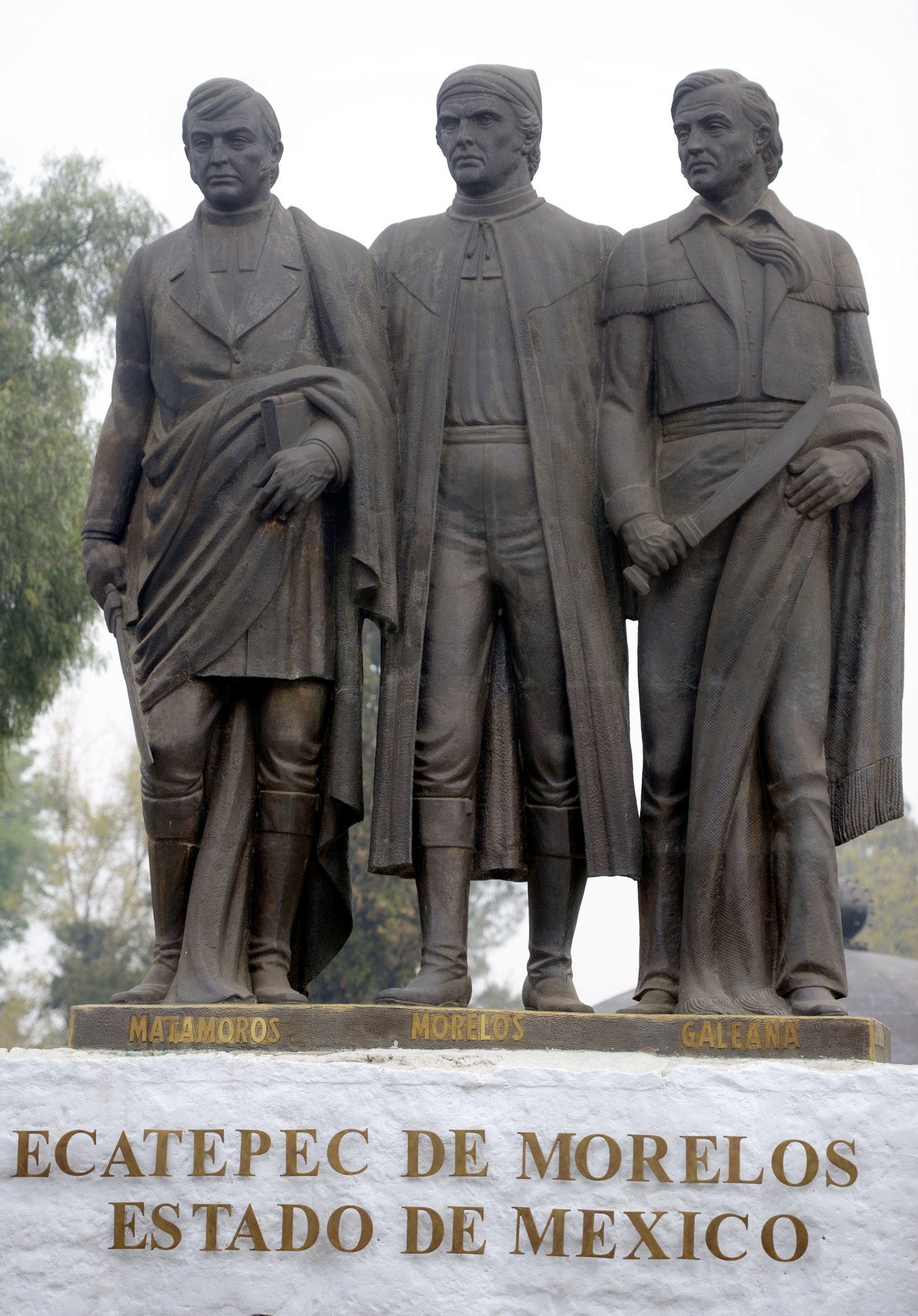
Statues of Mariano Matamoros, José María Morelos, and Hermenegildo Galeana on the main square

Remains of the earliest human habitation of the area have been found on the nearby Cerro de Ecatepec (Hill of Ecatepec). The area was settled by successive waves of Otomis; however, because of the later arrival of Toltec-Chichimecas that dominated the rest of the Valley of Mexico, the area eventually assimilated to the rest of the Valley, ending with its domination by the Aztec Empire. Ecatepec was an Aztec altepetl, or city-state.

From 1428 to 1539, Ecatepec was ruled by a tlatoani (pl. tlatoque), or "speaker". The tlatoque of Ecatepec were closely related to the ruling dynasty of Tenochtitlan. Notable tlatoque include:

- Chimalpilli I, grandson of Moctezuma I.
- Tezozomoc, son of Chimalpopoca.
- Matlaccohuatl, whose daughter Teotlalco married Moctezuma II.
- Chimalpilli II, son of Ahuitzotl.
- Diego de Alvarado Huanitzin, grandson of Axayacatl, who was made tlatoani of Tenochtitlan by Antonio de Mendoza, viceroy of New Spain.

During the Aztec empire, the Mexicas used the town to control trade routes going north.

=== Spanish rule and Independence ===
Ecatepec was granted by Hernan Cortés, to Aztec princess Mariana Leonor Moctezuma as an encomienda (landed estate) in 1527. Ecatepec was considered a "República de Indios" (Indian Republic) in 1560, allowing it to maintain some autonomy and keeping the succession of tlatoanis or chiefs. However, in the first part of the 17th century this was changed to a mayorship, with the Spanish administrating, along with the communities of Zumpango and Xalostoc.

National hero José María Morelos y Pavón was executed in Ecatepec in 1815 by the Spanish Army during the Mexican War of Independence. The house in which he was executed is now a museum, Museo Casa de Morelos.

The municipality was officially created on October 13, 1874. On October 1, 1877, San Cristóbal Ecatepec was declared a village and "de Morelos" was added to its name.

=== Contemporary events ===
Ecatepec experienced exponential population growth from 1970, as a result of rural migration to the Valley of Mexico. The seat was declared a city on December 1, 1980, and, by 2010, it had become the most populated municipality in the country. Population growth has stagnated since then.

The Roman Catholic Diocese of Ecatepec is the newest in the country, erected on June 28, 1995, around the Sagrado Corazón de Jesús Cathedral.

In April 1995, the remains of a mammoth were found in Colonia Ejidos de San Cristóbal, where the ancient lakes of Xaltocan-Ecatepec and Texcoco came together and where the Aztecs build a dam to keep the fresh and salty waters separate. The bones were dated to around 10,500 BC.

In February 2016, Pope Francis celebrated mass in the city in front of a crowd of 300,000. The Pope's message was one of encouragement and opposition to the violence and drug trade in the region.

== Politics ==
Mayor	Time
Luis Fernando Vilchis Contreras	2019–2024
Indalecio Ríos Velázquez	2016–2019

== Demography ==
Almost all of the population (99.9%) of the municipality lives in San Cristóbal Ecatepec, the third most-populous city in Mexico. There are also three rural localities in the municipality.

Locality	2020 Census Population
San Cristóbal Ecatepec	1,643,623
Mesa de los Leones	1,043
Tierra Blanca 2a Sección (Ejido Ecatepec)	615
Vista Hermosa	71
Total Municipality	1,645,352

== Economy ==
Ecatepec is an industrial center. Manufacturing, commerce, and services are the main pillars of the economy. Jumex has its headquarters in the city.

Two regional shopping malls, Plaza Las Américas and Multiplaza Aragón (Mexico's busiest as of 2018), both with multiple hypermarket and department store anchors, are located in Ecatepec.

== Infrastructure ==
Ecatepec, due to its population density, is one of the municipalities with the highest levels of infrastructure in the State of Mexico.

=== Roads ===
Ecatepec is a necessary path from Mexico City towards several other states in Mexico, such as Hidalgo. Its principal regional roadways are:

- Vía Morelos. A continuation of Avenida Centenario, it starts on the border with the alcaldía of Gustavo A. Madero and the municipality of Tlalnepantla de Baz. The road crosses several important industrial zones of Ecatepec, such as Xalostoc, Santa Calra, Tulpetlac, and San Andrés. Several factories are found on the road, such as those of Jumex, La Costeña, and Agromit. The road ends at the beginning of the Highway to Pachuca, or Avenida Nacional, at the colony of Venta de Carpio, Ecatepec.
- Avenida Nacional. The road begins on the bridge of El Arte, and ends around Avenida Palomas. It connects with Avenida Hank González and connects with the México-Tepexpan and Los Reyes Lechería Highways. The avenue continues until the limits of Ecatepec with Tecámac.
- Avenida Central. Also known as Avenida Central Carlos Hank González, it begins on the borders with Gustavo A. Madero. It is the continuation of Avenida Oceanía and Avenida 608. The road crosses Aragón from the Bosque de Aragón, through the colonies of San Juan de Aragón, all the sections of Valle de Aragón, Melchor Múzquiz, Fuentes de Aragón, Jardines de Aragón, and Rinconada de Aragón. Avenida Central continues after Aragón, crossing the following colonies of Ecatepec: Ciudad Azteca, Río de Luz, Industrias, Progreso de la Unión, Alfredo del Mazo, Valle de Ecatepec, Juan de la Barrera, Las Américas, Jardínes de Morelos, and 19 de Septiembre, and ends at the Venta de Carpio colony after crossing the Central de Abastos of Ecatepec, to which it owes the name "Central". Line B of the Mexico City Metro System and the first line of Mexibus run along this avenue. The Avenue is also a part of the Eje Troncal Metropolitano, which connects the south of the metropolitan area of Mexico City (Xochimilco) with the northern part (Ecatepec). Due to its extension, this roadway is often the site of several news reports.
- Avenida R-1 (or Vía Adolfo López Mateos). The avenue begins at the border with Gustavo A. Madero. Avenida R-1 is the continuation of Avenida León de los Aldama, and it crosses several industrial and residential zones. It concludes at the connection with Avenida Central.
- Anillo Periférico Oriente (or Boulevard Río de los Remedios). This roadway marks the southern limit of Ecatepec with Gustavo A. Madero and with the municipality of Nezahualcoyotl, and it is of great importance for the communication of Ecatepec and Mexico City.
- Autopista México-Pachuca. This highway begins in Mexico City, but has an exit at San Cristobal Ecatepec and the Circuito Exterior Mexiquense to exit around Los Héroes on the Lechería-Texcoco Highway. It also has a branch that heads to the archeological site of the Teotihuacan pyramids.
- Avenida 30-30 (or Avenida Revolución). This avenue is located in the San Cristobal colony of Ecatepec. It begins with a connection from Vía Morelos. The avenue is known for its 30-30 esplanade, where several bands have performed. This roadway connects with Vía José lópez Portillo, which leads towards Coacalco de Berriozábal, Tultitlán and Cuautitlán Izcalli. The official name of the roadway is Avenida Revolución, but it is popularly known as Avenida 30-30 due to a hardware store named "30-30", which was the site of a public transportation stop.
- Autopista Circuito Exterior Mexiquense. Although the highway begins at the limits of Ecatepec with Anillo Periférico, it also has two exits towards Avenida Central, within the colony of Las Américas. It is frequently used to avoid traffic in Avenida Central during rush hour.

=== Transportation ===
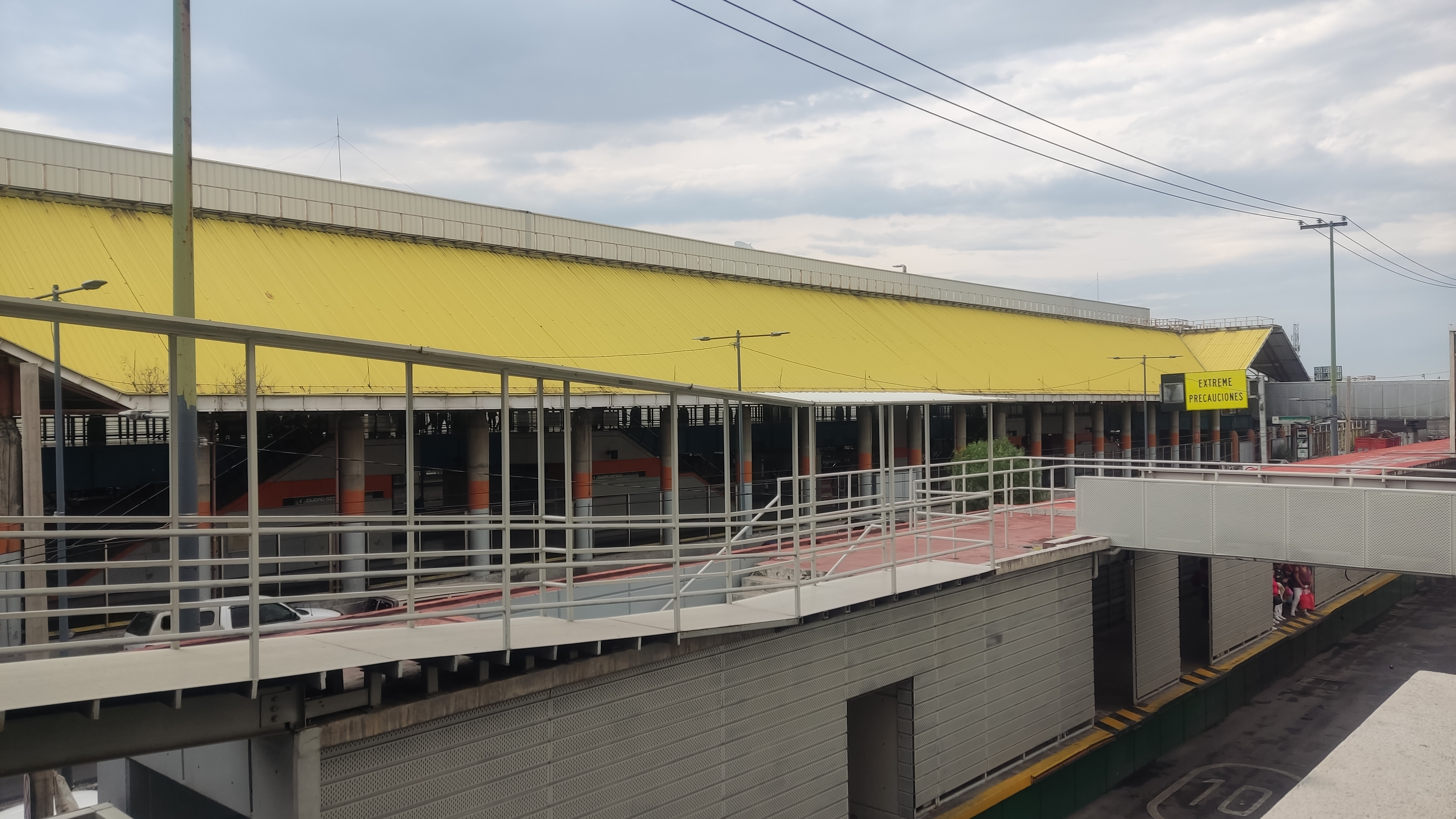
Ciudad Azteca metro (left) and Mexibús BRT stations

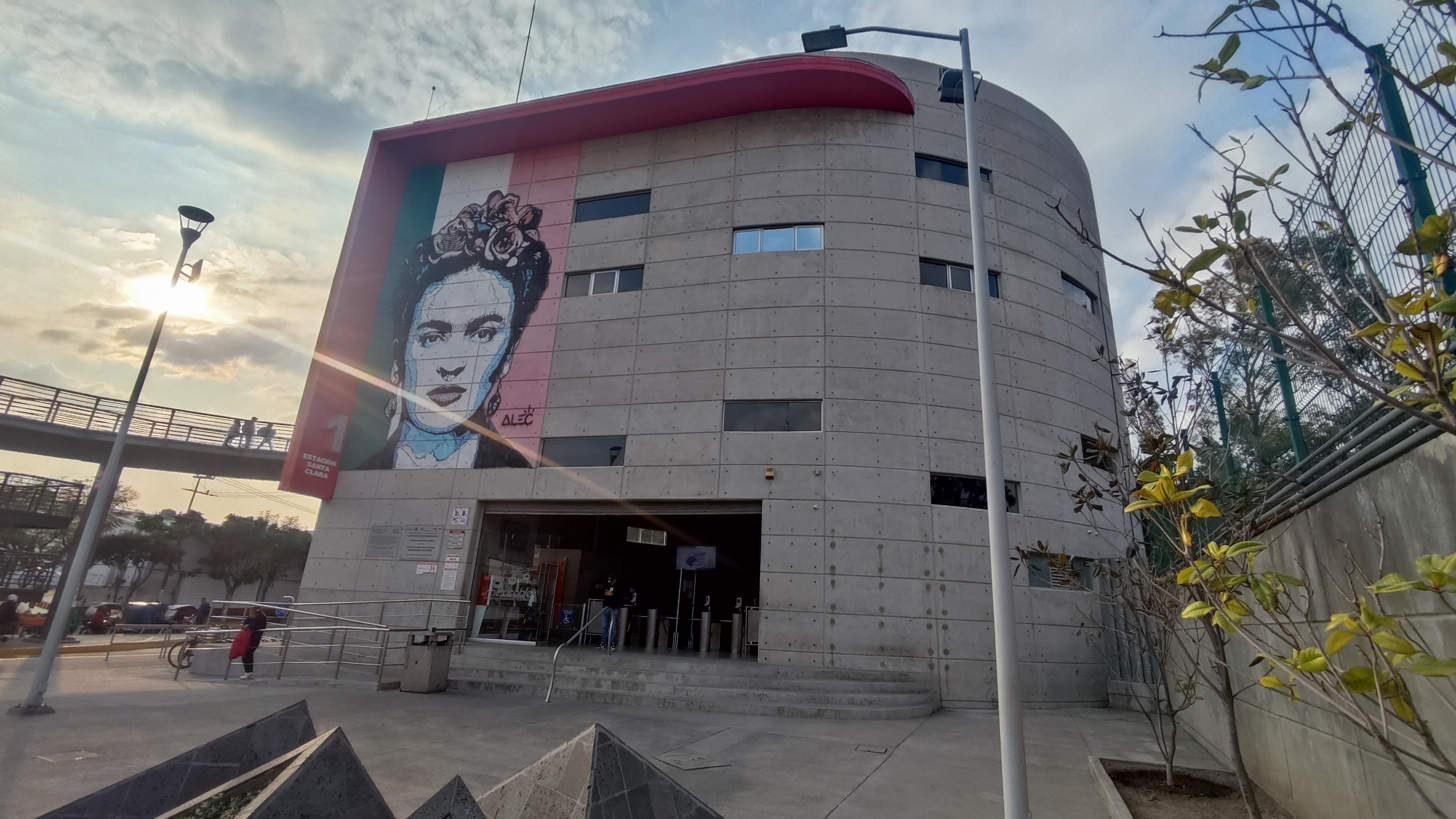
Santa Clara Mexicable station

Ecatepec is served by Line B of the Mexico City Metro system, including the stations of Muzquiz, Ecatepec (a.k.a. Tecnológico), Olímpica, Plaza Aragón, and Ciudad Azteca.

Mexibús bus rapid transit serving the State of Mexico serves Ecatepec with:

- Line I Ciudad Azteca – Ojo de Agua – Felipe Ángeles International Airport
- Line II Las Américas – La Quebrada
- Line IV Indios Verdes – Universidad Mexiquense del Bicentenario (Tecamac)

In 2016, a new form of public transportation started serving Ecatepec residents: Mexicable, an aerial cable car whose main purpose is to help residents get around faster (as opposed to being a tourist attraction), especially in areas with numerous hills and valleys without adequate bridges and viaducts. Mexicable Line 1, the first cable car built in Mexico as a form of public transportation, has 190 cars traveling a length of almost 5 kilometers (3 miles); it takes about 17 minutes to ride along the entire line. Line 1 connects Santa Clara with La Cañada via Hank González station. At Hank González station Mexicable Line 2 runs to Indios Verdes, a main hub for bus rapid transit (Metrobús and Mexibús), city bus, pesero minibus, metro, and regional buses.

Ecatepec is located on Fed 85, the Mexico City–Pachuca highway, Fed 57/Fed 57D (Circuito Exterior Mexiquense), and Fed 132 (Ecatepec–Teotihuacán highway).

== Sister cities ==
City	State	Country	Reference
Caracas	Miranda	Venezuela	
Cuautla	Morelos	Mexico	
Guadalupe	Zacatecas	Mexico	
Guangzhou	Guangdong	China	
Namyangju	Gyeonggi-do	South Korea	
San Jose	San Jose Province	Costa Rica	
Guarulhos	São Paulo	Brazil	
